= List of rivers of Brazil =

Map showing the major drainage basins of Brazil.

This is a list of rivers of Brazil.

== Alphabetical list of rivers in Brazil ==
=== A–C ===
- Acaraú River
- Acari River (Rio de Janeiro)
- Acari River (Roraima)
- Acauã River
- Acre River
- Açu River
- Açuã River
- Acurauá River
- Acuriá River
- Adelaide River (Brazil)
- Afuá River
- Água Amarela River
- Água Boa do Univini River
- Água Branca River
- Água Fria River (Braço Menor)
- Água Fria River (Tocantins River)
- Água Quente River (Maranhão)
- Água Quente River (Paraná)
- Da Água Morta River
- Aguapeí River (Mato Grosso)
- Aguapeí River (São Paulo)
- Lajeado Agudo
- Aiari River
- Aiuruoca River
- Ajarani River
- Alalaú River
- Alambari River (Tietê River)
- Alambari River (Turvo River)
- Alcântara River
- Alcobaça River (Brazil)
- Da Aldeia River
- Aldeia Velha River
- Alegre River (Espírito Santo)
- Alegre River (Goiás)
- Alegre River (Maranhão)
- Alegre River (Mato Grosso)
- Alegre River (Paraná)
- Alegre River (Rio de Janeiro)
- Almada River
- Das Almas River (Goiás)
- Das Almas River (Maranhão)
- Das Almas River (São Paulo)
- Das Almas River (Tocantins)
- Alonzo River
- Alpercatas River
- Alto Braço River
- Alto Jamari River
- Amajari River
- Amambaí River
- Amanã River
- Amandaú River
- Amanguijá River
- Amapá Grande River
- Amapá River
- Amapari River
- Amazon River
- Amola-Faca River (Caveiras River)
- Amola-Faca River (Itoupava River)
- Amônia River
- Anabiju River
- Anajás River
- Anamu River
- Anapu River
- Anari River
- Anauá River
- Andirá River (Acre River)
- Andirá River (Amazon River)
- Andirá River (Juruá River)
- Andirá River (Tapajós River)
- Andrade River
- Angelim River
- Anhanduí River
- Anhanduìzinho River
- Anhangabaú River
- Anotaié River
- Das Antas River (Bom River)
- Das Antas River (Goiás)
- Das Antas River (Rio Grande do Sul)
- Das Antas River (Santa Catarina)
- Das Antas River (Tibagi River)
- Antimary River
- Antoninha River
- Apa River
- Apiacá River
- Apiai-Guaçu River
- Apiai-Mirim River
- Apiaú River
- Apodi River
- Apoquitaua River
- Aporé River
- Aporema River
- Apuaê River
- Apuaú River
- Apucarama River
- Apucaraninha River
- Aquidabã River (Mato Grosso do Sul)
- Aquidabã River (Paraná)
- Aquidauana River
- Araçá River
- Aracacá River
- Aracatiaçu River
- Aracatimirim River
- Araçuaí River
- Araguá River
- Araguaia River
- Araguari River (Amapá)
- Araguari River (Minas Gerais) (Das Velhas River)
- Aramá River
- Dos Arantes River
- Arapari River (Amapá)
- Arapari River (Roraima)
- Arapiuns River
- Arapixi River
- Arara River (Acre)
- Arara River (Amazonas)
- Ararandeua River
- Araranguá River
- Araraquara River
- Araras River (Ivaí River)
- Araras River (Paraná)
- Arari River (Amazonas)
- Arari River (Pará)
- Ararirá River
- Araticu River
- Aratu River
- Arauá River (Aripuanã River)
- Arauá River (Coari River)
- Arauá River (Sergipe)
- Arauã River
- Da Areia River (Goio-Ere River)
- Da Areia River (Iguazu River)
- Areias River (Goiás)
- Areias River
- Aricanduva River
- Arinos River
- Aripuanã River
- Ariranha River
- Arraia River
- Arraial Velho River
- Arraias do Araguaia River
- Arraias River (Mato Grosso)
- Arraias River (Pará)
- Arraias River (Tocantins)
- Arroio Chuí
- Arroio Grande (Santa Catarina)
- Arroio Guaçu River
- Arroio Pelotas
- Arrojado River
- Arrojo River
- Aruã River
- Atelchu River
- Aterro River
- Atibaia River
- Atiparaná River
- Atuá River
- Atucatiquini River
- Auaiá-Miçu River
- Auari River
- Ribeirão Auila
- Aurá River
- Autaz-mirim River
- Avecutá River
- Axuí River
- Azul River (Acre)
- Azul River (Ivaí River)
- Azul River (Mato Grosso)
- Azul River (Piquiri River)
- Azul River (Rio Grande do Sul)
- Babilônia River
- Bacajá River
- Bacajaí River
- Bacaxá River
- Bacuri River
- Badajós River
- Baependi River
- Bagagem River (Goiás)
- Bagagem River (Minas Gerais)
- Bagagem River (Tocantins)
- Bagé River
- Baldum River
- Das Balsas River (Bahia)
- Das Balsas River (Maranhão)
- Das Balsas River (Tocantins)
- Balseira River
- Balsinhas River
- Banabuiú River
- Bananal River (Paraíba do Sul)
- Bananal River (Tocantins)
- Bandeira River (Chopim River)
- Bandeira River (Piquiri River)
- Bandeirantes do Norte River
- Do Banho River
- Baquiá Preto River
- Baquirivu-Guaçu River
- Baracuxi River
- Barão de Melgaço River
- Bararati River
- Barauana River
- Barauaninha River
- Barbado River
- Barbaquá River
- Barra Grande River (Ivaí River)
- Barra Grande River (Tibagi River)
- Barra Grande River (Santa Catarina)
- Da Barra Grande River
- Barra Mansa River
- Ribeirão Barra Mansa
- Barra Nova River
- Barra Seca River
- Barreiro de Baixo River
- Barreiro River (Mato Grosso)
- Barreiro River (Paraná)
- Barreiros River (Mato Grosso do Sul)
- Barreiros River (Tocantins)
- Barro Ouro River
- Batalha River
- Baú River
- Baú River
- Baunilhas River
- Bauru River
- Beberibe River
- Bela Joana River
- Belém River (Paraná)
- Belém River (Rondônia)
- Belo River (Iguazu River)
- Belo River (Ivaí River)
- Benedito River
- Benevente River
- Bengala River
- Das Bengalas River
- Benjamim Constant River
- Bento Gomes River
- Berlengas River
- Bernardo José River
- Betume River (Poxim River)
- Bezerra River (Goiás)
- Bezerra River (Tocantins)
- Biá River
- Bicudo River
- Biguaçu River
- Biritiba-Mirim River
- Bitumirim River
- Bituva River
- Boa Esperança River
- Boa Viagem River
- Boa Vista River
- Boacica River
- Bocaina River
- Bodó River
- Dos Bois River (Crixás Açu River)
- Dos Bois River (Das Almas River)
- Rio dos Bois (Paranaíba River)
- Bom Retiro River
- Bom River
- Bonito River (Alonzo River)
- Bonito River (Caceribu River)
- Bonito River (Canoinhas River)
- Bonito River (Correntes River) (Timbó River)
- Bonito River (Goiás)
- Bonito River (Ivaí River)
- Bonito River (Macaé River)
- Bonito River (Rio das Flores)
- Bonito River (Timbó River)
- Bonito River (Tocantins)
- Borboleta River
- Borrachudo River
- Botas River
- Boucaraí River
- Do Braço River (Santa Catarina)
- Braço do Norte Direito River
- Braço do Norte River
- Braço Menor do Rio Araguaia River
- Braço Norte do Rio Itaúnas
- Braço Norte do Rio São Mateus (Cotaxé River)
- Braço Norte Esquerdo River
- Braço Sul do Rio Itaúnas
- Braço Sul do Rio São Mateus (Cricaré River)
- Bracuí River
- Branco River
- Branco ou Cabixi River
- Branco River (Acre)
- Branco River (Aripuanã River)
- Branco River (Bahia)
- Branco River (Guaporé River)
- Branco River (Jaciparaná River)
- Branco River (Jamari River)
- Branco River (Mato Grosso do Sul)
- Branco River (Pará)
- Branco River (Paraná)
- Branco River (Roosevelt River)
- Branco River (São Paulo)
- Branquinho River
- Brejo Grande River
- Breu River
- De Breves River
- Brigida River
- Brilhante River
- Brioso River
- Brumado River
- Bugre River
- Bulha River
- Buquira River
- Buranhém River
- Buricá River
- Buriti River
- Buriticupu River
- Burro Branco River
- Butiá River
- Caá-Iari River
- Caatinga River
- Cabaçal River
- Cabixi River
- Cabuçu de Cima River (Guapira River)
- Cabuçu River
- Caçador Grande River
- Cacequi River
- Caceribu River
- Cachimbau River
- Cachoeira Grande River
- Cachoeira River (Bahia) (Do Engenho River)
- Cachoeira River (Paraná)
- Cachoeira River (Potinga River)
- Cachoeira River (Timbó River)
- Cachoeira River (São Paulo)
- Cachoeirão River
- Cachoeirinha River
- Cachorro River (Pará)
- Cachorro River (Roraima)
- Cachorro River (Sergipe)
- Cadeia River
- Caeté River (Acre)
- Caeté River (Pará)
- Cafuini River
- Cafundó River (Itiúba River)
- Cágado River (Minas Gerais)
- Cágado River (Sergipe)
- Caí River
- Caiapó River (Goiás)
- Caiapó River (Tocantins)
- Caiapozinho River
- Igarapé Caipora
- Cairari River
- Cais River
- Caiuá River
- Dos Caixões River
- Cajari River (Amapá)
- Cajari River (Marajó)
- Cajàzeira River
- Caju River
- Cajupiranga River
- Cajuúna River
- Calabouço River
- Calçado River (Itabapoana River tributary)
- Calçado River (Jacarandá River tributary)
- Calçado River (Rio de Janeiro)
- Calçoene River
- Caldas River
- Camaipi River do Maracá River
- Camaipi River do Vila Nova River
- Camaiú River
- Camanaú River
- Camanducaia River (São Paulo)
- Camaoi River
- Camaquã River
- Camará River
- Camaragibe River
- Camaraipe River
- Camararé River
- Camarazinho River
- Cambé River
- Camboriú River
- Cambu River
- Camburu River
- Camisas River
- Da Campanha River
- Campista River
- Campo Alegre River
- Campo Belo River
- Campo Novo do Sul River
- Campo Real River
- Campos Novos River
- Cana Brava River (Paranã River)
- Cana Brava River (Santa Tereza River)
- Cana Brava River (lower Tocantins River)
- Cana Brava River (upper Tocantins River)
- Canã River
- Canastra River
- Canaticu River
- Candeias River
- Cangati River
- Canhoto River
- Canindé River (Ceará)
- Canindé River (Piauí)
- Canoas River (Mampituba River) (Sertão River)
- Canoas River (Minas Gerais)
- Canoas River (Paraná)
- Canoas River (Santa Catarina)
- Canoinhas River
- Cantarinho River
- Canto River
- Cantú River
- Canumã River
- Capanema River
- Capão Grande River
- Capetinga River
- Capiá River
- Capibaribe River
- Capim River
- Capitão Cardoso River
- Capivara River (Araçuaí River)
- Capivara River (Goiás)
- Capivari River (Minas Gerais)
- Capivara River (Paraná)
- Capivara River (Piauí)
- Capivara River (Roraima)
- Capivara River (Santa Tereza River)
- Capivara River (São Paulo)
- Capivara River (Sergipe)
- Capivara River (Tocantins River)
- Capivaras River
- Capivari River (Bahia)
- Capivari River (Mato Grosso do Sul)
- Capivari River (Paraná)
- Capivari River (Paranapanema River)
- Capivari River (Pardo River)
- Capivari River (Rio de Janeiro)
- Capivari River (Santa Catarina)
- Capivari River (São João River)
- Capivari River (Tietê River)
- Capricórnio River
- Capucapu River
- Carabinani River
- Caracol River (Mato Grosso do Sul)
- Caracol River (Rondônia)
- Caracol River (Tocantins)
- Caracu River
- Caraíva River
- Carajá River
- Carajarí River
- Carangola River
- Caratuva River
- Caravelas River
- Carecuru River
- Cariaçã River
- Carinhanha River
- Carioca River
- Caripi River
- Caripunás River
- Cariús River
- Do Carmo River
- Do Carmo River (Minas Gerais)
- Carnaíba de Dentro River
- Carnaíba de Fora River
- Carnaúba River
- Caroaebe River
- Carreiro River
- Caru River
- Carucango River
- Da Casca River
- Cassanje River
- Cassiporé River
- Castelo River
- Catete River (Iriri River)
- Catete River (Itacaiunas River)
- Cati River
- Catolé Grande River
- Catrimani River
- Catu River
- Catundó River
- Cauaburi River
- Cauamé River
- Cauaruau River
- Caurés River
- Cautário River
- Dos Cavalos River
- Caveiras River
- Cavernoso River
- Caxambu River
- Caxias River
- Caxitoré River
- Caxixa River
- Ceará-Mirim River
- Do Cedro River
- Dos Cedros River
- Cerquinha River
- Chalana River
- Chambuiaco River
- Chandless River
- Chapecó River
- Chapecozinho River
- Chiché River
- Chopim River
- Choró River
- Chupador River
- Cinco Voltas River
- Das Cinzas River
- Cipó River
- Ciriquiri River
- Citaré River
- Claro River (Apucaraninha River)
- Claro River (Araguaia River)
- Claro River (Iguazu River)
- Claro River (Ivaí River)
- Claro River (lower Tietê River)
- Claro River (Minas Gerais)
- Claro River (Paranaíba River)
- Claro River (Pardo River)
- Claro River (Preto River)
- Claro River (upper Tietê River)
- Coari River
- Das Cobras River
- Do Cobre River
- Igarapé Cochichá
- Do Coco River
- Cocó River
- Codòzinho River
- Coimim River
- Coitinho River
- Do Colégio River
- Colindó River
- Colônia River
- Colorado River
- Comandaí River
- Combate River
- Comemoração River
- Comprido River (Paraíba do Sul)
- Comprido River (São Paulo)
- Conceição River (Ceará)
- Conceição River (Rio de Janeiro)
- Conceição River (Rio Grande do Sul)
- Congonhas River
- Das Contas River
- De Contas River
- Contendas River
- Copatana River
- Coraci River
- Corda River
- Coreaú River
- Corrente River (Bahia)
- Corrente River (Doce River)
- Corrente River (Paranã River)
- Corrente River (Paranaíba River)
- Corrente River (Piauí)
- Corrente River (Rio do Peixe)
- Correntes River (Mato Grosso)
- Correntes River (Santa Catarina)
- Correntes River (Maranhão)
- Corumbá River
- Corumbataí River (Paraná)
- Corumbataí River (São Paulo)
- Corumbiara River
- Coruripe River
- Corvo River
- Cotegipe River
- Coti River
- Cotia River
- Cotingo River
- Cotinguiba River
- Couto de Magalhães River
- Coxá River
- Coxim River
- Coxipó River
- Crauari River
- Crepori River
- Cricou River
- Ribeirão Crisóstomo
- Cristalino River (Teles Pires)
- Crixás Açu River
- Crixás Mirim River
- Crixás River (Goiás)
- Crixás River (Tocantins)
- Cruxati River
- Cubatão River (north Santa Catarina)
- Cubatão River (Paraná)
- Cubatão River (São Paulo)
- Cubatão River (south Santa Catarina)
- Cubatãozinho River
- Cubate River
- Cuc River
- Cuiabá River
- Cuiari River
- Cuiaté River
- Cuieiras River (Demini River)
- Cuieiras River (Rio Negro)
- Cuini River
- Culari River
- Culuene River
- Cumbuco River
- Cuminapanema River
- Cunani River
- Cunaú River
- Cunhãmati River
- Cunhaporanga River
- Das Cunhãs River
- Cuniuá River
- Cupido River
- Cupijó River
- Cupixi River
- Curaçá River
- Curapi River
- Curiaú River
- Curiche Grande River (Corixa Grande River)
- Curicuriari River
- Curimataí River
- Curimataú River
- Curisevo River
- Curiuaú River
- Currais Novos River
- Curu River
- Curuá do Sul River
- Curuá River (Amazon River)
- Curuá River (Iriri River)
- Curuá River (Mato Grosso)
- Curuá Una River
- Curuaés River
- Curuçá River (Javari River)
- Curuçá River (Pará)
- Curuduri River
- Curupara River
- Curuquetê River
- Cururu River (Marajó)
- Cururu River (Tapajós River)
- Cururuaçu River
- Cutanji River
- Cutia River

=== D–I ===
- Daraá River
- Demini River
- Descoberto River
- Desquite River
- Diamantina River (Brazil)
- Diamantino River
- Da Direita River
- Da Divisa River
- Doce River
- Doce River
- Doce River (Rio Grande do Norte)
- Dois de Setembro River
- Dois Rios River
- Douradinho River
- Dourado River (Minas Gerais)
- Dourado River (Rio Grande do Sul)
- Dourado River (São Paulo)
- Dourados River (Goiás)
- Dourados River (Mato Grosso do Sul)
- Dourados River (Minas Gerais)
- Dueré River
- D'Una River
- Dos Duques River
- Da Dúvida River
- Das Éguas River (Correntina River)
- Eiru River
- Elvas River
- Embu-Guaçu River
- Embu-Mirim River
- Encantado River
- Endimari River
- Engano River (Itajaí River)
- Engano River (Uruguay River)
- Do Engano River
- Enjeitado River
- Envira River
- Erechim River
- Ereo River
- Ericó River
- Escondido (Guaporé)
- Escurinho River
- Escuro River (Minas Gerais)
- Escuro River (Tocantins)
- Esfolado River
- Espalha River
- Espingarda River
- Espinharas River
- Estiva River
- Estrela River
- Da Faca River
- Fagundes River
- Falsino River
- Fanado River
- Faria River
- Faria Timbó River
- Farinha River
- Da Farinha River
- Da Fartura River
- Feio River
- Feitosa River
- Feliciano River (Brazil)
- Das Fêmeas River
- Ferrero River
- Fidalgo River
- Flip balls nan River
- Do Filipe River
- Fiúza River
- Flechal River
- Flor do Prado River
- Das Flores River (Maranhão)
- Das Flores River (Rio de Janeiro)
- Das Flores River (Santa Catarina)
- Floriano River (Paraíba)
- Floriano River (Paraná)
- Do Fogo River
- Formiga River (Mato Grosso)
- Formiga River (Tocantins)
- Formoso River (Bahia)
- Formoso River (Goiás)
- Formoso River (Paraná)
- Formoso River (Rondônia)
- Formoso River (Tocantins) (Cristalino River)
- Forqueta River
- Forquetinha River
- Forquilha River
- Forromeco River
- Fortaleza River
- Do Frade River
- Dos Frades River
- Francês River
- Freire Muniz River
- Fresco River
- Fumaça River
- Da Fumaça River
- Fundão River
- Fundo River (Espírito Santo)
- Fundo River (Sergipe)
- Do Funil River
- Furo do Tajapuru
- Furo Santa Rosa
- Do Gado River
- Gajapara River
- Do Galé River
- Galera River
- Galheirão River
- Gameleira River
- Ganhoão River
- Garça River
- Das Garças River (Mato Grosso)
- Das Garças River (Rondônia)
- Garcia River (Brazil)
- Garou River
- Gavião River
- Gemuuma River
- Goiana River
- Goiatá River
- Goio-Bang River
- Goioerê River
- Gonçalves Dias River
- Gongogi River
- Gorutuba River
- Grajaú River (Acre)
- Grajaú River (Maranhão)
- Gramame River
- Rio Grande (Paraná River)
- Grande River (Bahia)
- Grande River (Dois Rios River)
- Grande River (Paraná)
- Grande River (Rio de Janeiro)
- Ribeirão Grande (Tietê River)
- Gravatá River (Minas Gerais)
- Gravatá River (Paraíba)
- Gravatá River (Pernambuco)
- Gravataí River
- Gregório River (Amazonas)
- Gregório River (Goiás)
- Groaíras River
- Grotão das Arraias River
- Guaiamã River
- Guaíba River
- Guaio River
- Guajará River (Amazon)
- Guajará River (Marajó)
- Guaji River
- Guaju River
- Gualaxo do Sul River
- Guamá River
- Guandu River (Espírito Santo)
- Guandu River (Paraíba)
- Guandu River (Rio de Janeiro)
- Guandu-Mirim River
- Guapi-Áçu River
- Guaporé River
- Guaporé River (Rio Grande do Sul)
- Guará River
- Guarani River
- Guarapari River
- Guarapiranga River
- Guarapó River
- Guaraqueçaba River
- Guaratinguetá River
- Guarauninha River
- Da Guarda River (Itaguaí River)
- Guareí River (Mato Grosso do Sul)
- Guareí River (São Paulo)
- Guariba River (Pauini River)
- Guaribe River
- Guarijuba River
- Guarita River
- Guaritire River
- Guaxindiba River
- Guaxindiba River (Norte Fluminense)
- Guaxindibe River
- Guaxupé River
- Gurguéia River
- Gurinhém River
- Gurinhenzinho River
- Gurjaú River
- Gurupi River
- Gurupí River
- Huaiá-Miçu River
- Humaitã River (Turvo River)
- Humboldt River (Brazil)
- Iá River
- Iaco River
- Iapó River
- Iaué River
- Ibicuí da Armada River
- Ibicuí da Cruz River
- Ibicuí River
- Ibicuí-Mirim River
- Ibirapuitã Chico River
- Ibirapuitã River
- Ibirubá River
- Icamaquã River
- Içana River
- Iconha River
- Igarapé Humaitá
- Iguaçu River (Rio de Janeiro)
- Iguará River
- Iguatemi River
- Iguazu River
- Ijuí River
- Ijuizinho River
- Imabu River
- Imaruí River (Marium River)
- Imbariê River
- Imbaú River
- Do Imbé River
- Imbituva River
- Imboacica River
- Imuti River
- Iná River
- Inajá River
- Inauini River
- Indaiá River
- Indaiá Grande River
- Indaiaçu River
- Indiaroba River
- Do Indio River (Santa Catarina)
- Dos Indios River (Canoas River)
- Dos Indios River (Itajaí River)
- Dos Indios River (lower Ivaí River)
- Dos Indios River (upper Ivaí River)
- Inferno Grande River
- Ingá River
- Ingaí River
- Inhandava River (Forquilha River)
- Inhomirim River
- Inhumas River
- Inhumas River (Mato Grosso do Sul)
- Inipaco River
- Ipanema River
- Ipiranga River (Paraná)
- Ipiranga River (São Paulo)
- Ipiranga River (Pará)
- Ipiranga Brook
- Ipitinga River
- Ipixuna River (Juruá River)
- Ipixuna River (Madeira River)
- Ipixuna River (Purus River)
- Ipojuca River
- Iporã River
- Iquê River
- Iracema River
- Irani River
- Iraputã River
- Iratapina River
- Iratapuru River
- Iratim River
- Iratinzinho River
- Maú River
- Iriri Novo River
- Iriri River (Rio de Janeiro)
- Iriri River
- Itã River
- Itabapoana River
- Itacaiunas River
- Itacambiruçu River
- Itacanoeira River
- Itacarambi River
- Itacolomi River
- Itagacaba River
- Itaguari River
- Itaim River (Minas Gerais)
- Itaim River (Piauí)
- Itaim River (São Paulo)
- Itajaí do Norte River
- Itajaí do Oeste River
- Itajaí do Sul River
- Itajaí-Açu River
- Itajaí-Mirim River
- Itamarandiba River
- Itambacurí River
- Itamirim River
- Itanhaém River
- Itanhauá River
- Itapanhaú River
- Itapará River
- Itaparaná River
- Itapecerica River
- Itapecuru River
- Itapecuruzinho River
- Itapemirim River
- Itapeti River
- Itapetininga River
- Itapicuru River
- Itapicuru-Açu River
- Itapicuru-Mirim River
- Itapirapuã River
- Itapoama River
- Itapoçu River
- Itapocuzinho River
- Itaquai River
- Itaquiraí River
- Itararé River
- Itata River (Brazil)
- Itaueira River
- Itaúna River
- Itaúnas River
- Itauninha River
- Itaxueiras River
- Itimirim River
- Itinguçu River
- Itinga River
- Itiquira River
- Itoupava River
- Itu River
- Itucumã River
- Ituí River
- Ituim River
- Itupeva River
- Ituxi River
- Ivaí River
- Ivaí River (Rio Grande do Sul)
- Ivaizinho River
- Ivinhema River

=== J–L ===
- Jabiberi River
- Jaboatão River
- Jabotá River
- Jaburu River
- Jacaraípe River
- Jacarandá River
- Jacaré Pepira River
- Jacaré River (Alagoas)
- Jacaré River (Bahia, Das Contas River)
- Jacaré River (Bahia, São Francisco River)
- Jacaré River (Minas Gerais)
- Jacaré River (Pará)
- Jacaré River (Piquiri River)
- Jacaré River (Purus River)
- Jacaré River (Rio das Cinzas) (Jacarezinho River)
- Jacaré River (Sergipe, Piauí River)
- Jacaré River (Sergipe, São Francisco River)
- Jacarecica River
- Jacaré-Guaçu River
- Jaciparaná River
- Jacoca River (Paraíba)
- Jacoca River (Sergipe)
- Jacu River
- Jacuba River
- Jacuí River
- Jacuí River (São Paulo)
- Jacuí-Mirim River
- Jacuípe River (Bahia)
- Jacuípe River (Paraíba)
- Jacuípe River (Pernambuco)
- Jacuizinho River
- Jacundá River (Pará)
- Jacundá River (Rondônia)
- Jacupiranga River
- Jacuriaí River
- Jacurutu River
- Jacutinga River (Paraná)
- Jacutinga River (Rio das Antas)
- Jacutinga River (Uruguay River)
- Da Jacutinga River
- Jaguarão River
- Jaguari Mirim River
- Jaguari River (Canastra River)
- Jaguari River (Ibicuí River)
- Jaguari River (Paraíba do Sul)
- Jaguari River (Piracicaba River)
- Jaguariaíva River
- Jaguariatu River
- Jaguaribe River
- Jaguarizinho River
- Jagui River
- Jaibaras River
- Jamanxim River
- Jamari River
- Jamicia River
- Jaminauá River
- Jandiatuba River
- Jangada River (Iguazu River)
- Jangada River (Piquiri River)
- Japaratuba River
- Japoré River
- Japuiba River
- Japurá River
- Jaquirana River
- Jaracatiá River
- Jararaca River
- Jaraucu River
- Jardim River (Distrito Federal)
- Jardim River
- Jari River (Purus River)
- Jari River
- Jaru River
- Jataí River
- Jatapu River
- Jatobá River
- Jatuarana River
- Jaú River (Amazonas)
- Jaú River (São Paulo)
- Jauaperi River
- Jauaru River
- Jauquara River
- Jauru River (Mato Grosso do Sul)
- Jauru River (Mato Grosso)
- Javary River
- Jenipapo River
- Jenipapucu River
- Jequiá River (Alagoas)
- Jequiá River (Rio de Janeiro) (on Governador Island)
- Jequié River
- Jequiriçá River
- Jequitaí River
- Jequitinhonha River
- Dos Jesuítas River
- Ji-Paraná River (Machado River)
- Jirituba River
- João de Tiba River
- João Leite River
- João Paulo River
- Jordão River (Acre)
- Jordão River (Paraná)
- Jorigue River
- Juami River
- Juari River
- Juazeiro River
- Juba River (Mato Grosso)
- Jucá River
- Jucu Braço Norte River
- Jucu Braço Sul River
- Jucu River
- Jucurucu River
- Jufari River
- Juína River
- Juína-Miriam River
- Juininha River
- Juma River (Brazil)
- Jundiá River (Santa Catarina)
- Jundiá River
- Jundiaí River (Espírito Santo)
- Jundiaí River (Rio Grande do Norte)
- Jundiaí River (upper Tietê River)
- Jundiaí River (São Paulo)
- Jundiuvira River
- Jupati River
- Juqueri River
- Juquiá River
- Jurema River
- Juriti River
- Juruá River (Rondônia)
- Juruá River
- Juruá-Mirim River
- Juruazinho River
- Juruena River
- Jurupari River
- Jutai River
- Jutaizinho River
- Jutuva River
- Kariniutu River
- Kevuaieli River
- Lacerda de Almeida River
- Da Laguna River (Pauxis River)
- Lajeado Grande River (Das Antas River)
- Lajeado Grande River (Rio da Várzea)
- Lajeado River (Maranhão)
- Lajeado River (Paraná)
- Lajeado River (Tocantins)
- Lajeado Sertão
- Das Lajes River
- Ribeirão das Lajes
- Lambari River (Pará River)
- Lambedor River
- Laranjaí River
- Laranjal River
- Laranjeiras River (Paraná)
- Laranjeiras River (Santa Catarina)
- Laranjinha River
- Lava-Tudo River
- Leão River
- Do Leão River
- Lençóis River
- Leste River
- Lever River (Itaberaí River)
- Liberdade River (Juruá River)
- Liberdade River (Xingu River)
- Ligeiro River
- Lôbo d'Almada River
- Longá River
- Lonqueador River
- Lontra River
- Ribeirão Lontra
- Das Lontras River
- Lourenço River
- Lourenço Velho River
- Luís Alves River
- Luna River

=== M–P ===
- Macabu River
- Macabuzinho River
- Maçacara River
- Macaco Branco River
- Macaco River
- Macacoari River
- Macacos River (Ceará)
- Macacos River (Paraná)
- Macacu River
- Macaé River
- Macambira River (Ceará) (Inhuçu River)
- Macambira River (Goiás)
- Macari River
- Macauã River
- Macaúba River
- Macaxeira River
- Machadinho River
- Machado River (Minas Gerais)
- Lajeado Macuco
- Macucuaú River
- Madeira River
- Madeirinha River
- Mãe Luzia River
- Magé River
- Magu River
- Maiá River
- Maici River
- Maicuru River
- Mainart River
- Maiquinique River
- Mamanguape River
- Mamboré River
- Mambucaba River
- Mamiá River (Amazonas)
- Mamiá River (Pará)
- Mamoré River
- Mamoriá River
- Mampituba River
- Mamuru River
- Manacapuru River
- Manguaba River
- Dos Mangues River
- Manhuaçu River
- Manicoré River
- Manicorezinho River
- Manissauá-Miçu River
- Mansinho River
- Manso River (Goiás)
- Manso River (Mato Grosso)
- Manso River (Minas Gerais)
- Manuel Alves da Natividade River
- Manuel Alves Grande River
- Manuel Alves Pequeno River
- Manuel Alves River (Santa Catarina)
- Mapaoni River
- Mapari River
- Mapiá Grande River
- Mapiri River
- Mapuá River
- Mapuera River
- Maquiné River
- Maracá River
- Maracacumé River
- Maracaí River
- Maracajá River (Baracaju River)
- Maracanã River (Amazonas)
- Maracanã River (Rio de Janeiro)
- Maracani River
- Maracá-Pucu River
- Marajó-Açu River
- Marajozinho River
- Maranhão River
- Marapí River
- Marari River
- Maratá River
- Maratasã River
- Marauiá River
- Maré River
- Maria Paula River
- Mariaquã River
- Marié River
- Mariepauá River
- Marimari River
- Mario Preta River
- Mariricu River
- Marituba River
- Marmelada River
- Dos Marmelos River
- Marombas River
- Marrecas River (Belo River)
- Marrecas River (Santana River)
- Das Marrecas River
- Maruanum River
- Marupi River
- Matapi River
- Mataurá River
- Matipó River
- Do Mato River (Santa Catarina)
- Mato Rico River
- Dos Matos River
- Matrinxã River
- Matupiri River
- Maués Açu River
- Maxaranguape River
- Mazomba River
- Mearim River
- Medonho River
- Meia Ponte River
- Do Meio River (Bahia, Corrente River)
- Do Meio River (Bahia, Jequié River)
- Do Meio River (Bahia, Peruípe River)
- Do Meio River (Braço do Norte River)
- Do Meio River (Itajaí River)
- Do Meio River (Paraíba)
- Do Meio River (Paraná)
- Do Meio River (Rio de Janeiro)
- Do Meio River (Rio Grande do Sul)
- Meirim River
- Melchior River
- Melissa River
- Membeca River
- Mequéns River (Guaporé River)
- Mequéns River (São João River)
- Dos Meros River
- Miang River
- Das Minas River
- Mineruázinho River
- Miranda River (Brazil)
- Mirapuxi River
- Miringuava River
- Miriri River
- Miriti River
- Mitéuca River
- Moa River (Brazil)
- Moacir Ávidos River
- Mocambo River
- Mocatu River
- Moções River
- Mocotó River
- Moji-Guaçu River
- Moji-Mirim River
- Moju River (Acará)
- Moju dos Campos River
- Monjolinho River
- Morro Alegre River
- Rio das Mortes (Minas Gerais)
- Rio das Mortes
- Morto River
- Mosquito River (Minas Gerais)
- Mosquito River (Pardo River)
- Mosquito River (Tocantins)
- Do Moura River (Paraná da Viúva River)
- Mourão River
- Moxotó River
- Muaco River
- Muaná River
- Mucajaí River
- Mucum River
- Mucuri River
- Mucutá River
- Muguilhão River
- Mumbaba River
- Mundaú River (Ceará)
- Mundaú River
- Munim River
- Muqui do Norte River
- Muqui do Sul River
- Muqui River
- Muriaé River
- Muribaca River
- Muricizal River
- Muru River
- Mururé River
- Mutuacá River
- Mutum River (Amapá)
- Mutum River (Amazonas)
- Mutum River (Espírito Santo)
- Mutum River (Mato Grosso)
- Mutumparaná River
- Mutura River
- Muzambo River
- Nabileque River
- Igarapé Natal
- Do Navio River
- Negrinho River (Mafra, Santa Catarina)
- Negrinho River (Mato Grosso do Sul)
- Negro River (Mato Grosso do Sul)
- Negro River (Paraná)
- Negro River (Rio de Janeiro)
- Negro River (Rondônia)
- Negro River (Tocantins)
- Rio Negro (Amazon)
- Río Negro (Uruguay)
- Nhamundá River
- Nioaque River
- Noidoro River
- Noucouru River
- Do Norte River (Espírito Santo)
- Nova Lombárdia River
- Novo River (Anauá River)
- Novo River (Coxim River)
- Novo River (Espírito Santo)
- Novo River (Iriri River)
- Novo River (Jamanxim River)
- Novo River (Minas Gerais)
- Novo River (Paraguay River)
- Novo River (Paranapanema River)
- Novo River (Pardo River)
- Novo River (Rondônia)
- Novo River (Santa Catarina)
- Novo River (Xeriuini River)
- Obim River
- Ocoi River
- Dos Oeiras River
- Ogarantim River (Fortaleza River)
- Dos Oitis River
- Da Onça River (Santa Catarina)
- Das Ondas River
- Oriçanga River
- Orobó River
- Ouricuri River
- Ouro River (Acre)
- Do Ouro River (Bahia)
- Do Ouro River (Goiás)
- Do Ouro River (Rio Grande do Sul)
- Do Ouro River (Santa Catarina)
- Do Ouro River (Rondônia)
- Ouro Preto River
- Oiapoque River
- Pacaás Novos River
- Pacajá River
- Paciá River
- Paciência River
- Pacoti River
- Pacu River (Amajari River)
- Pacu River (Catrimani River)
- Pacu River (Pará)
- Pacuí River (Gorutuba River)
- Pacuí River (São Francisco River)
- Pacuma River
- Pacuneiro River
- Padauari River
- Pagão River
- Pajé River
- Pajeú River
- Palha River
- Palhano River
- Palheiro River
- Palma River
- Palmares River
- Das Palmas River
- Palmeiras River (Goiás)
- Palmeiras River (Tocantins)
- Palmital River (Goiás)
- Palmital River (Paraná)
- Palmital River (Pardo River)
- Palmital River (Santa Catarina)
- Palomas River
- Pampã River
- Panari River
- Panaúba River
- Pancas River
- Pandeiros River
- Panquinhas River
- Pântano River
- Papagaio River (Amazonas)
- Papagaio River (Mato Grosso)
- Dos Papagaios River
- Papocas River
- Papuri River
- Paquequer River (Sumidouro)
- Paquequer River (Teresópolis)
- Pará Mirim River
- Pará River
- Pará River (Minas Gerais)
- Paracaí River (Paraná)
- Paracatu River
- Paracatu River (Brasília de Minas)
- Paracauari River
- Paracauti River
- Paraconi River
- Paracori River
- Parado River
- Paraguaçu River
- Paraguay River
- Paraguazinho River
- Paraíba do Meio River
- Paraíba do Norte River
- Paraíba do Sul
- Paraibinha River (Alagoas)
- Paraibinha River (Paraíba)
- Paraibuna River (São Paulo)
- Paraibuna River (Minas Gerais)
- Paraim River
- Paraitinga River (upper Tietê River)
- Paraitinga River
- Paramirim River
- Paraná River
- Paraná River (Maranhão)
- Igarapé Paraná
- Paraná Urariá
- Paranã River
- Paranã River (Tocantins)
- Paranaíba River
- Paranaíta River
- Paranapanema River
- Paranhana River
- Paranoá River
- Paraopeba River
- Paratari River
- Parateí River (Lambari-Parateí River)
- Paratibe River
- Paratiji River
- Paraú River
- Parauapebas River
- Parauari River
- Pardinho River (Minas Gerais)
- Pardo River (Amazonas)
- Pardo River (Bahia)
- Pardo River (Das Velhas River)
- Pardo River (Mato Grosso do Sul)
- Pardo River (Pará)
- Pardo River (Paranapanema River)
- Pardo River (Ribeira River)
- Pardo River (Rio Grande do Sul)
- Pardo River (Rondônia)
- Pardo River (São Francisco River)
- Pardo River (São Paulo)
- Dos Pardos River (Santa Catarina)
- Parecis River
- Paricarana River
- Parima River
- Parimé River
- Pariquera-Açu River
- Parnaíba River
- Parnaìbinha River
- Parnamirim River
- Paroeira River
- Dos Patos River (Goiás)
- Dos Patos River (Iratim River)
- Dos Patos River (Ivaí River)
- Dos Patos River (Mato Grosso)
- Paru de Oeste River (Cuminá River)
- Paru River
- Passa Cinco River
- Passa Dois River
- Passa Três River
- Passa Una River
- Passo Fundo River
- Pataxós River
- Pati River (Bóia River)
- Pato Branco River
- Pau Alto River
- Pau Atravessado River
- Pau d'Arco River
- Pau Gigante River
- Pauini River (Purus River)
- Pauini River (Unini River)
- Paulista River
- Paulo Diniz River
- Pau-Seco River
- Pavuna River
- Ribeirão da Paz
- Pedra d´Água River
- Da Pedra River
- Das Pedras River (Anhumas River)
- Das Pedras River (Bahia)
- Das Pedras River (Goiás)
- Das Pedras River (Piracicaba River)
- Das Pedras River (Santa Catarina)
- Das Pedras River (Una da Aldeia River)
- Pedreira River
- Peixe River (Bahia)
- Peixe River (Corumbá River)
- Peixe River (Crixás Açu River)
- Peixe River (Das Almas River)
- Peixe River (lower Araguaia River)
- Peixe River (Paraíba)
- Peixe River (upper Araguaia River)
- Do Peixe River (Jaguari River)
- Do Peixe River (Mato Grosso do Sul)
- Do Peixe River (Moji-Guaçu River)
- Do Peixe River (Moji-Guaçu River)
- Do Peixe River (Pará River)
- Do Peixe River (Paraibuna River)
- Do Peixe River (Paraibuna River, São Paulo)
- Do Peixe River (Paraná River)
- Do Peixe River (Santa Catarina)
- Do Peixe River (Sapucaí River)
- Do Peixe River (Tietê River)
- Dos Peixes River (Mato Grosso)
- Peixoto de Azevedo River
- Pelotas River
- Pelotinhas River
- Pendotiba River
- Peperiguaçu River
- Pequeno River (Santa Catarina)
- Pequeno River (São Paulo)
- Perdida River
- Perdido River (Mato Grosso do Sul)
- Perdido River (Paraná)
- Perequê-Áçu River
- Periá River
- Perimbó River
- Peritoró River
- Persinuga River
- Peruaçu River
- Perucaba River
- Peruípe River
- Da Pescaria River
- Pesqueiro River
- Petita River (Porto Alegre River)
- Piabanha River
- Piaçaca River
- Piaí River
- Piancó River
- Piauí River (Piauí)
- Piauí River (Alagoas)
- Piauí River (Minas Gerais)
- Piauí River (Sergipe)
- Piauitinga River
- Piaus River
- Picuí River
- Piedade River
- Pilões River (São Paulo)
- Pimenta Bueno River
- Pimpão River
- Ribeirão Pindaíba
- Pindaré River
- Pinguim River
- Pinhal Grande River
- Pinhal River
- Pinhão River
- Pinheirinho River
- Pinheiros River (Jurabatuba River)
- Pinhuã River
- Pintado River
- Do Pinto River
- Piorini River
- Pipiripau River
- Piquiri River (Paraná)
- Piquirí River (São Lourenço)
- Pirabeiraba River
- Piracanjuba River (Corumbá River)
- Piracanjuba River (Paranaíba River)
- Piracicaba River (Minas Gerais)
- Piracicaba River (São Paulo)
- Piraçupiá River (Santa Rita River)
- Piracuruca River
- Piraí River (Paraná)
- Piraí River (Rio de Janeiro)
- Piraí River (Santa Catarina)
- Piraí-Mirim River
- Piraju River
- Pirajuí River
- Piranema River
- Pirangi River
- Piranhas River
- Piranhas River (Goiás)
- Piranhas River (lower Araguaia River)
- Piranhas River (upper Araguaia River)
- Piranji River (Pernambuco)
- Piranji River (Piauí)
- Pirapama River
- Pirapemas River
- Pirapetinga River
- Pirapetinga River (upper Paraíba do Sul)
- Pirapó River
- Pirapozinho River
- Piraquara River
- Piraquê Açu River
- Piraquê River
- Piraquê-Mirim River
- Pirari River
- Piratinga River
- Piratini River (Uruguay River)
- Piratini River (São Gonçalo Channel)
- Piratucu River
- Piriá River (Marajó)
- Piriá River (Eastern Pará)
- Piripucu River
- Pitanga River (Paraná)
- Pitanga River (Pernambuco)
- Pitanga River (Sergipe)
- Pitangueiras River
- Pitangui River
- Pitimbu River
- Pitinga River
- Pium River
- Pium River (Pará)
- Poana River
- Poço Bonito River
- Poço Triste River
- Dos Poços River
- Poguba River (Vermelho River)
- Pojuca River
- Pomba River
- Das Pombas River
- Pomonga River
- Pongal River
- Ponta Grossa River
- Pontal River
- Ponte Alta River
- Ponte de Pedra River
- Porcos River
- Dos Porcos River (Bahia)
- Dos Porcos River (Santa Catarina)
- Porto das Caixas River
- Dos Portões River
- Potengi River (Potenji River, Rio Grande do Norte)
- Poti River
- Potinga River
- Povoamento River
- Poxim Açu River
- Poxim Mirim River
- Poxim River
- Pracaí River
- Pracumba River
- Pracupí River
- Pracuúba River
- Da Prata River (Espírito Santo)
- Da Prata River (Goiás)
- Da Prata River (Paracatu River)
- Da Prata River (Paraná)
- Da Prata River (Rio Grande do Sul)
- Da Prata River (Santa Catarina)
- Da Prata River (Tijuco River)
- Da Prata River (Tocantins)
- Prataji River
- Prato River (Espírito Santo)
- Pratudão River
- Preguiças River
- Preto da Eva River
- Preto de Candeias River
- Preto do Crespo River
- Prêto do Igapó-Açu River
- Preto River (Amapá)
- Preto River (Bahia, Atlantic Ocean)
- Preto River (Bahia, Grande River)
- Preto River (Cricaré River)
- Preto River (Itabapoana River)
- Preto River (Itaúnas River) (Itauninhas River)
- Preto River (Maranhão)
- Preto River (Mariricu River)
- Preto River (Negro River)
- Preto River (Padauari River)
- Preto River (Paracatu River)
- Preto River (Paraíba)
- Preto River (Paraibuna River)
- Preto River (Paraná)
- Preto River (Paranaíba River)
- Preto River (Pernambuco)
- Preto River (Piabanha River)
- Preto River (Rio do Peixe)
- Preto River (Rondônia)
- Preto River (Roraima)
- Preto River (São Paulo)
- Preto River (Tocantins River)
- Preto River (Unini River)
- Preto River (Ururaí River)
- Puduari River
- Púlpito River
- Punaú River
- Pureté River
- Puruba River
- Puruê River
- Purus River
- Putumayo River
- Puturã River

=== Q–S ===
- QTopian River
- Quaraí River
- Quartel River
- Do Quati River
- Quatro Cachoeiras River
- Quebra-Anzol River
- Quebra-Dentes River
- Queimados River
- Quilombo River (Juquiá River)
- Quinó River
- Quinze de Novembro River (Espírito Santo)
- Quinze de Novembro River (Santa Catarina)
- Quitauau River
- Quitéria River
- Quitéro River
- Quixeramobim River
- Quixito River
- Rancho Grande River
- Das Rãs River
- Ratones River
- Real River (Brazil)
- Regame River
- Reis Magos River
- Represa Grande River
- Riachão River (Bahia)
- Riacho River (Espírito Santo)
- Ribeira de Iguape River
- Ribeira River (Paraíba)
- Ribeira River (Paraná)
- Ribeirão River (Araraduara River)
- Rio de Janeiro (Bahia)
- Riozinho River (Amazonas)
- Riozinho River (Braço Menor)
- Riozinho River (Pará)
- Riozinho River (Pium River)
- Igarapé Riozinho
- Do Rocha River (Paraná)
- Roda Velha River
- Rodeador River
- Rolante River
- Rolim de Moura River
- Rondi Toró River
- Ronuro River
- Roosevelt River
- Rubim do Norte River
- Rubim do Sul River
- Sabugi River
- Saco River (Maranhão)
- Saco River (Paracauari)
- Do Saco River (Rio de Janeiro)
- Sacraiú River
- Sacre River (Mato Grosso)
- Sacuriuiná River
- Sagradouro Grande River
- Do Sal River (Goiás)
- Do Sal River (Sergipe)
- Sal Amargo River
- Salabro River
- Salgadinho River
- Salgado River (Alagoas)
- Salgado River (Ceará)
- Salgado River (Rio Grande do Norte) (Amargoso River)
- Salgado River (São Francisco River)
- Salgado River (Sergipe River)
- Salgado River (Vaza-Barris River)
- Salinas River (Minas Gerais)
- Das Salinas River
- Salitre River
- Salobra River
- Salto River (Paraíba)
- Do Salto River (Paraná)
- Do Salto River (Rio de Janeiro)
- Salvador River (Paraíba)
- Samambaia River
- Samambaia River (Goiás)
- Sambito River
- Sana River (Rio de Janeiro)
- Sangue River
- Do Sangue River
- Sanhauá River
- Santa Catarina River (Minas Gerais)
- Santa Catarina River (Rio de Janeiro)
- Santa Cruz River (Santa Catarina)
- Santa Joana River
- Santa Júlia River
- Santa Maria da Vitória River
- Santa Maria do Rio Doce River
- Santa Maria River (Mato Grosso do Sul)
- Santa Maria River (Rio Grande do Sul)
- Santa Maria River (Sergipe)
- Ribeirão Santa Maria
- Santa Quitéria River
- Santa Rosa River (Acre)
- Santa Rosa River (Rio Grande do Sul)
- Santa Tereza River
- Santana River (Bahia)
- Santana River (Espírito Santo)
- Santana River (Maranhão)
- Santana River (Mato Grosso do Sul)
- Santana River (Minas Gerais)
- Santana River (Paraná)
- Santana River (Rio de Janeiro)
- Sant'Ana River (Piedade River)
- Sant'Ana River (Rio da Areia)
- Ribeirão Santana
- Santo Agostinho River
- Santo Anastácio River
- Santo Antônio River (Amapá)
- Santo Antônio River (Bahia)
- Santo Antônio River (Doce River)
- Santo Antônio River (Itaúnas River)
- Santo Antônio River (Paraná)
- Santo Antônio River (Rio de Janeiro)
- Santo Antônio River (Rio do Sono)
- Santo Antônio River (Santa Catarina)
- Santo Antônio River (Tocantins)
- Santo Antônio Grande River
- Santo Cristo River
- Santo Onofre River
- São Bartolomeu River
- São Benedito River
- São Bento River (Goiás)
- São Bento River (Mãe Luzia River)
- São Bento River (Rio do Peixe)
- São Bernardo River (Distrito Federal)
- São Bernardo River (Goiás)
- São Desidério River
- São Domingos Grande River
- São Domingos River (Goiás)
- São Domingos River (Mato Grosso do Sul)
- São Domingos River (Minas Gerais)
- São Domingos River (Rio de Janeiro)
- São Domingos River (Rio Grande do Sul)
- São Domingos River (Rondônia)
- São Domingos River (Santa Catarina)
- São Domingos River (São Paulo)
- São Domingos River (Tocantins)
- São Fernando River (Rio de Janeiro)
- São Francisco River
- São Francisco River (Belo River)
- São Francisco River (Jaciparaná River)
- São Francisco River (Jequitinhonha River)
- São Francisco River (Paraíba)
- São Francisco River (Paraná)
- São Francisco River (Rio de Janeiro)
- São Francisco River (São Miguel River)
- São Francisco Falso Braço Norte River
- São Francisco Falso Braço Sul River
- São Gonçalo Channel
- São Gonçalo River
- São Jerônimo River (Pinhão River)
- São Jerônimo River (Tibagi River)
- São João da Barra River
- São João de Meriti River (Meriti River)
- São João do Paraíso River
- São João Grande River
- São João Pequeno River
- São João River (Canoas River)
- São João River (Cubatão River)
- São João River (Iguazu River)
- São João River (Ji-Paraná River)
- São João River (Mato Grosso do Sul)
- São João River (Mato Grosso)
- São João River (Minas Gerais)
- São João River (Negro River)
- São João River (Paraná River)
- São João River (Dos Patos River)
- São João River (Pernambuco)
- São João River (Pitangui River)
- São João River (Rio de Janeiro)
- São João River (Verde River)
- Igarapé São João
- São João Surrá River
- São José do Guapiara River
- São José dos Cordeiros River
- São José dos Dourados River
- São José River (Espírito Santo)
- São Lourenço River (Juquiá River)
- São Lourenço River (Mato Grosso)
- São Lourenço River (Paraná)
- São Lourenço River (Rio Grande do Sul)
- São Lourenço River (Tietê River)
- São Luís River (Acre)
- São Luís River (Amapá)
- São Marcos River
- São Mateus River (Santa Catarina)
- São Mateus River
- São Miguel River (Alagoas)
- São Miguel River (Espírito Santo)
- São Miguel River (Minas Gerais)
- São Miguel River (Rondônia)
- São Nicolau River
- São Patrício River
- São Pedro River (Alonzo River)
- São Pedro River (Guandu River)
- São Pedro River (Macaé River)
- São Pedro River (Minas Gerais)
- São Pedro River (Pernambuco)
- São Pedro River (Rondônia)
- São Pedro River (Santa Catarina)
- São Pedro River (São Paulo)
- São Sebastião River (Espírito Santo)
- São Sebastião River (Paraná)
- São Sepe River
- São Simão River
- São Tomás River
- São Tomé River (Mato Grosso)
- São Valério River
- São Venceslau River
- Sapão River
- Sapucaí River (Minas Gerais)
- Sapucaí River (Paraná) (Reboucas River)
- Sapucaí River (São Paulo)
- Sapucaia River
- Sapucai-Mirim River
- Saracura River
- Saracuruna River
- Sarapuí River (São Paulo)
- Sarapuí River (Rio de Janeiro)
- Sararé River
- Sargento River
- Satuba River
- Saudades River (lower Chapecó River)
- Saudades River (upper Chapecó River)
- Sauêruiná River
- Sepatini River
- Sepoti River
- Sepotuba River
- Sereno River
- Sergipe River
- Seridó River
- Seriema River
- Serra Negra River
- Seruini River
- Sesmarias River
- Sete de Setembro River
- Setúbal River
- Siemens River
- Igarapé Sindrichal
- Dos Sinos River
- Siriji River
- Sirinhaém River
- Siriri River
- Sitiá River
- Sobradinho Creek
- Socavão River
- Socorro River
- Soé River
- Sombrio River (Brazil)
- Do Sono River (Minas Gerais)
- Do Sono River (Tocantins)
- Sorocaba River
- Sororò River
- Sotério River
- Soturno River
- Suaçuí Grande River
- Suaçuí Pequeno River
- Suçuarana River
- Sucunduri River
- Sucuriú River
- Sucuru River
- Suia-Miçu River
- Sumidouro Grande River
- Sumidouro River
- Surubiu River
- Suruí River
- Surumu River
- Suzana River

=== T–Z ===
- Tabatinga River
- Taboco River
- Tacaniça River
- Tacunapi River
- Tacutu River
- Tadarimana River
- Taiaçupeba River
- Taiaçupeba-Mirim River
- Tainhas River
- Taió River
- Taíras River
- Tajauí River
- Tamanduá River
- Tamanduateí River
- Tamitatoale River
- Tanaru River
- Tangararé River
- Tapacurã River
- Tapajós River
- Tapauá River
- Tapera River (Paraíba)
- Tapera River (Paraná)
- Taperoá River
- Tapira River
- Tapiracuí River
- Tapirapé River (Mato Grosso)
- Tapirapé River (Pará)
- Tapirucu River
- Tapuio River
- Taquara River
- Taquaraçu River (Mato Grosso do Sul)
- Taquaraçu River (Espírito Santo)
- Taquari River (Mato Grosso do Sul)
- Taquari River (Rio Grande do Sul)
- Taquari River-Mirim (Rio Grande do Sul)
- Taquari-Guaçu River
- Taquari-Mirim River (Mato Grosso do Sul)
- Taquaruçu River
- Taquaruçu River (São Paulo)
- Tarauacá River
- Tartarugal Grande River
- Tartarugalzinho River
- Tartarugas River
- Tarumã Açu River
- Tarumã Mirim River
- Tarunã River
- Tatuamunha River
- Tatuí River
- Tatuí River (Paraná)
- Tauini River
- Tavares River
- Tea River
- Tefé River
- Tejo River
- Teles Pires
- Da Telha River
- Tenente Marques River
- Tererê River
- Terra Nova River (Pernambuco)
- Tesoura River
- Tibagi River
- Tibiri River
- Tibiriça River
- Tietê River
- Tijipió River
- Tijucas River
- Tijuco River
- Tijuípe River
- Timbó River
- Timbozinho River
- Timbuí River
- Timonha River
- Tinguá River
- Tiúba River
- Tocantins River
- Tocantins River (Jamanxim River)
- Tocantizinho River
- Todos os Santos River
- Tomé River
- Tonantins River
- Toototobi River
- Tormenta River
- Toropi River
- Tourinho River
- Dos Touros River
- Tracunhaém River
- Traida River
- Traipu River
- Traira River
- Trairão River
- Traíras River (Goiás)
- Trairi River (Ceará)
- Trairi River (Rio Grande do Norte)
- Trairi River (Roraima)
- Tramandaí River
- Trapicheiros River
- Três Barras River (Paraná)
- Três Barras River (Santa Catarina)
- Três Bôcas River
- Três Forquilhas River
- Três Voltas River
- Tributo River
- Tricolor River
- Tromaí River
- Trombetas River
- Trombudo River
- Das Tropas River
- Truçu River
- Tubarão River
- Tucunduba River
- Tucurui River
- Tucutol River
- Tueré River
- Tumiã River
- Tupana River
- Turiaçu River
- Turvo River (Goiás)
- Turvo River (Grande River)
- Turvo River (Itapetininga River)
- Turvo River (Minas Gerais)
- Turvo River (Paraná)
- Turvo River (Pardo (Paranapanema) River)
- Turvo River (Rio de Janeiro)
- Turvo River (Rio Grande do Sul)
- Tutuí River
- Uaçá River
- Uaicurapa River
- Uailan River
- Uarini River
- Uatatas River
- Uatumã River
- Uauaris River
- Ubatiba River
- Ubatuba River
- Ubazinho River
- Uberaba River (Minas Gerais)
- Uberaba River (Paraná)
- Uberabinha River
- Uimeerê River
- Umari River
- Umari River (Rio Grande do Norte)
- Do Umbuzeiro River
- Umbuzerio River
- Una River (Itaete, Bahia)
- Una River (Una, Bahia)
- Una River (Valença, Bahia)
- Una River (Paraíba)
- Una River (Pernambuco)
- Una River (Rio de Janeiro)
- Una do Prelado River
- Uneiuxi River
- Unini River
- Upanema River
- Uraim River
- Uraricaá River
- Uraricoera River
- Uriuana River
- Uru River (Goiás)
- Uru River (Maranhão)
- Uruá River
- Urubaxi River
- Urubu River (Amazonas)
- Urubu River (Rio de Janeiro)
- Urubu River (Roraima)
- Urubu Grande River (Das Pedras River)
- Urucaua River
- Urucu River
- Uruçuí Prêto River
- Urucuia River
- Uruçuí-Vermelho River
- Uruguay River
- Urupá River
- Urupaça River
- Urupadi River
- Ururaí River
- Urussanga River
- Utinga River
- Vacacaí River
- Vacacaí-Mirim River
- Vacaria River
- Vacaria River (Minas Gerais)
- Vacas Gordas River
- Valparaiso River (Brazil)
- Varadouro River
- Vargem do Braço River
- Da Várzea River (Iguazu River)
- Da Várzea River (Negro River)
- Da Várzea River (Rio Grande do Sul)
- Uaupés River
- Vaza-Barris River
- Vazante Grande
- Veado River (Itabapoana River)
- Veado River (Santo Antônio River)
- Do Veado River
- Das Velhas River
- Velho River (São Paulo)
- Verde Grande River
- Verde Pequeno River
- Verde River (Bahia)
- Verde River (Bolivia)
- Verde River (Das Almas River)
- Verde River (Das Bois River) (Verdão River)
- Verde River (Grande River)
- Rio Verde (Guaporé River tributary, Mato Grosso)
- Rio Verde (Guaporé River tributary, Rondônia)
- Verde River (Jamari River)
- Verde River (lower Paranaíba River)
- Verde River (Maranhão River)
- Verde River (Mato Grosso do Sul)
- Verde River (Piquiri River)
- Verde River (Sacre River)
- Verde River (São Paulo)
- Verde River (Sapucaí River)
- Verde River (Teles Pires River)
- Verde River (Tocantins)
- Verde River (upper Paranaíba River)
- Verdinho River
- Vereda Pimenteira
- Veríssimo River
- Vermelho River (Corrente River)
- Vermelho River (Iguazu River)
- Vermelho River (Manuel Alves Grande River)
- Vermelho River (Mato Grosso)
- Vermelho River (Palmeiras River)
- Vermelho River (Pará)
- Vermelho River (Paranapanema River)
- Vermelho River (Perdida River)
- Vermelho River (Rondônia)
- Vermelho River (Santa Catarina)
- Vila Nova River
- Viruaquim River
- Vitorino River
- Vorá River
- Xambrê River
- Xaparu River
- Xapuri River
- Xavante River (Mato Grosso)
- Xavante River (Tocantins)
- Xavantinho River
- Xeriuini River
- Xeruã River
- Xie River (Brazil)
- Ximim-Ximim River
- Xingu River
- Xinxim River
- Xipamanu River
- Zumbi River
- Zutia River

== See also ==
- Geography of Brazil#Rivers and lakes
- List of rivers of the Americas by coastline
- Movimento dos Atingidos por Barragens
