= Arraias River =

Arraias River may refer to several rivers in Brazil:

- Arraias River (Mato Grosso)
- Arraias River (Pará)
- Arraias River (Tocantins)
- Arraias do Araguaia River
