= Riozinho River =

Riozinho River may refer to any of several rivers in Brazil:

- Riozinho River (Amazonas)
- Riozinho River (Braço Menor)
- Riozinho River (Pará), a river of Pará
- Riozinho River (Piauí)
- Riozinho River (Pium River tributary)
- Igarapé Riozinho, Acre
