= Coco River (Araguaia River tributary) =

- Location within Brazil
- Native name: Rio do Coco (Portuguese)

Location
- Country: Brazil

Physical characteristics
- Source
  - location: Tocantins state
- Mouth: Araguaia River
  - coordinates: 9.235184°S 49.966844°W

The Coco River (Portuguese: Rio do Coco) is a river of Tocantins state in central Brazil. It is a tributary of the Araguaia River and forms part of the Tocantins basin.

== Lower course ==
The lower portion of the Coco River forms the eastern boundary of the Cantão State Park, and the western boundary of the Ilha do Bananal/Cantão Environmental Protection Area. This section was probably originally a meander of the Javaés River, in turn a branch of the Araguaia. The frequently flooded Cantão region between the Coco and Araguaia rivers holds an ecotone between the Amazon and Cerrado biomes.

== See also ==
- List of rivers of Tocantins

== Sources ==
- PES do Cantão (in Portuguese), ISA: Instituto Socioambiental
