= List of rivers of Tocantins =

List of rivers in Tocantins (Brazilian State).

The list is arranged by drainage basin, with respective tributaries indented under each larger stream's name and ordered from downstream to upstream. The Tocantins state is located entirely within the Tocantins drainage basin.

== By Drainage Basin ==
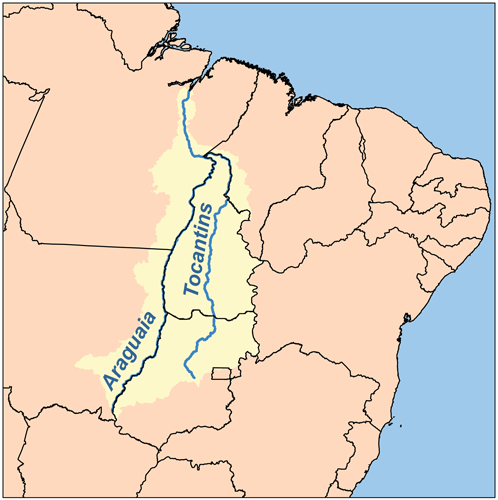
Map of the Araguaia/Tocantins basin

- Tocantins River
  - Araguaia River
    - Piranhas River (lower)
    - Lontra River
    - Muricizal River
    - Das Cunhãs River
    - Juari River
    - Barreiros River
    - Bananal River
    - Piranhas River (upper)
    - Caiapó River
      - Caiapozinho River
    - Do Coco River
    - Braço Menor do Rio Araguaia River (Javaés River)
      - Lever River (Itaberaí River)
      - Pium River
        - Riozinho River
      - Formoso River (Cristalino River)
        - Urubu Grande River (Das Pedras River)
        - Dueré River
        - Xavante River
        - Piaus River
          - Escuro River
        - Pau-Seco River
      - Riozinho River
        - Rondi Toró River
        - Jaburu River
        - Imuti River
      - Do Fogo River
      - Água Fria River
      - Verde River
        - Tiúba River
  - Cana Brava River
  - Grotão das Arraias River
  - Manuel Alves Grande River
    - Vermelho River
      - Bonito River
  - Manuel Alves Pequeno River
  - Capivara River
  - Água Fria River
  - Do Sono River
    - Soninho River
    - Novo River
    - Perdida River
      - Negro River
      - Da Prata River
      - Vermelho River
    - Das Balsas River
      - Fumaça River
    - Espingarda River
    - Caracol River
  - Lajeado River
  - Dos Mangues River
  - Areias River
  - Crixás River
  - Formiga River
  - Manuel Alves da Natividade River
    - Bagagem River
  - São Valério River
  - Santo Antônio River
  - Santa Tereza River
    - Cana Brava River
      - Morro Alegre River
    - Capivara River
  - Das Almas River
  - Paranã River
    - Palma River
      - Arraias River
      - Palmeiras River
      - Mosquito River
    - São Domingos River
    - Bezerra River
  - Mocambo River
  - Taíras River

== Alphabetically ==
- Água Fria River
- Água Fria River
- Das Almas River
- Araguaia River
- Areias River
- Arraias River
- Bagagem River
- Das Balsas River
- Bananal River
- Barreiros River
- Bezerra River
- Bonito River
- Braço Menor do Rio Araguaia River (Javaés River)
- Caiapó River
- Caiapozinho River
- Cana Brava River
- Cana Brava River
- Capivara River
- Capivara River
- Caracol River
- Do Coco River
- Crixás River
- Das Cunhãs River
- Dueré River
- Escuro River
- Espingarda River
- Do Fogo River
- Formiga River
- Formoso River (Cristalino River)
- Fumaça River
- Grotão das Arraias River
- Imuti River
- Jaburu River
- Juari River
- Lajeado River
- Lever River (Itaberaí River)
- Lontra River
- Dos Mangues River
- Manuel Alves da Natividade River
- Manuel Alves Grande River
- Manuel Alves Pequeno River
- Mocambo River
- Morro Alegre River
- Mosquito River
- Muricizal River
- Negro River
- Novo River
- Palma River
- Palmeiras River
- Paranã River
- Pau-Seco River
- Perdida River
- Piaus River
- Piranhas River
- Piranhas River
- Pium River
- Da Prata River
- Riozinho River
- Riozinho River
- Rondi Toró River
- Santa Tereza River
- Santo Antônio River
- São Domingos River
- São Valério River
- Soninho River
- Do Sono River
- Taíras River
- Tiúba River
- Tocantins River
- Urubu Grande River (Das Pedras River)
- Verde River
- Vermelho River
- Vermelho River
- Xavante River
