= Piranhas River (disambiguation) =

The Piranhas River or Açu River is a river of northeastern Brazil.

Piranhas River may also refer to:

- Piranhas River (Goiás), in central Brazil
- Piranhas River (lower Araguaia River tributary), in west-central Tocantins near Araguacema
- Piranhas River (upper Araguaia River tributary), in northern Tocantins near Araguatins
