= Bagagem River =

Bagagem River may refer to three rivers in Brazil:

- Bagagem River (Goiás)
- Bagagem River (Minas Gerais)
- Bagagem River (Tocantins)
