= Santo Antônio River =

There are several rivers named Santo Antônio River.

- San Antonio River (South America) on the border between Argentina and Brazil

== Brazil ==
- Santo Antônio River (Amapá)
- Santo Antônio River (Bahia)
- Santo Antônio River (Doce River tributary)
- Santo Antônio River (Itaúnas River tributary)
- Santo Antônio River (Paraná)
- Santo Antônio River (Rio de Janeiro)
- Santo Antônio River (Do Sono River tributary)
- Santo Antônio River (Santa Catarina)
- Santo Antônio River (Tocantins)
- Santo Antônio Grande River
