= Lever River =

Coordinates: 10°00′S 50°07′W

Location
- Country: Brazil

Physical characteristics
- Source
  - location: Tocantins state
- Mouth: Javaés River

The Lever River is a river of Tocantins state in central Brazil. Part of the Tocantins basin, the Lever is a tributary of the Javaés River, which is itself a tributary of the Araguaia River.

== See also ==
- List of rivers of Tocantins
