= Água Fria River =

Água Fria River may refer to:

- Água Fria River (Braço Menor), Brazil
- Água Fria River (Tocantins River), Brazil
