= Pium River =

Location
- Country: Brazil

Physical characteristics
- Source
  - location: Tocantins state
- Mouth
  - coordinates: 10°23′S 49°50′W

The Pium River is a river of Tocantins state in central Brazil. Part of the Tocantins basin, the Pium is a tributary of the Javaés River, which in turn is a tributary of the Araguaia River.

== See also ==
- List of rivers of Tocantins
