= Bananal River =

Bananal River may refer to the following rivers in Brazil:

- Bananal River (Paraíba do Sul)
- Bananal River (Tocantins)

== See also ==
- Banana River, in Florida, U.S.
