= Caiapozinho River =

Coordinates: 9.5726°S 49.3577°W

Location
- Country: Brazil

Physical characteristics
- Source
  - location: Tocantins state

The Caiapozinho River is a river of Tocantins state in central Brazil. It is a tributary of the Caiapó River and part of the Tocantins basin.

== See also ==
- List of rivers of Tocantins
