= Muricizal River =

Coordinates: 6°40′01″S 48°39′51″W

Location
- Country: Brazil

Physical characteristics
- Source
  - location: Tocantins state

The Muricizal River is a river of Tocantins state, in central Brazil. It is part of the Tocantins basin. The Muricizal is a tributary of the Araguaia River.

== See also ==
- List of rivers of Tocantins
