= Riozinho River (Pium River tributary) =

Riozinho River (Pium River)

Location
- Country: Brazil

Physical characteristics
- Source
  - location: Tocantins state

The Riozinho River (Pium River) is a river of Tocantins state in central Brazil. It is a tributary of the Pium River, which through the Javaés River flows into the Araguaia River.

== See also ==
- List of rivers of Tocantins
