= Juari River =

River in Tocantins, Brazil

Location
- Country: Brazil

Physical characteristics
- Source
  - location: Tocantins state

The Juari River is a river of Tocantins state in central Brazil. The Juari is part of the Tocantins basin and a tributary of the Araguaia River.

== See also ==
- List of rivers of Tocantins
