= Caiapó River =

Caiapó River may refer to:

== Brazil ==
- Caiapó River (Goiás)
- Caiapó River (Tocantins)

== See also ==
- Carapo River, Venezuela
