= Das Cunhãs River =

Location
- Country: Brazil

Physical characteristics
- Source
  - location: Tocantins state
- Mouth: Araguaia River
  - coordinates: 7°51′32″S 49°09′33″W

The Das Cunhãs River is a river of Tocantins state in central Brazil and part of the eponymous basin.

== See also ==
- List of rivers of Tocantins
