= Areias River =

Coordinates: 10°50′29″S 48°23′48″W

Location
- Country: Brazil

Physical characteristics
- Source
  - location: Tocantins state

The Areias River is a river of Tocantins state in central Brazil and within the Tocantins drainage basin.

== See also ==
- List of rivers of Tocantins
