= Tiúba River =

Location
- Country: Brazil

Physical characteristics
- Source
  - location: Tocantins state
- Mouth
  - location: Rio Verde
  - coordinates: 12°54′S 50°9′W

The Tiúba River is a river on the border between Goiás and Tocantins states in central Brazil.

== See also ==
- List of rivers of Goiás
- List of rivers of Tocantins
