= Caratuva River =

River in Brazil

Location
- Country: Brazil

Physical characteristics
- Source
  - location: Paraná state
- Mouth: Cantú River
  - coordinates: 24°44′S 52°43′W

The Caratuva River is a river of Paraná state in southern Brazil. It is a tributary of the Cantú River.

== See also ==
- List of rivers of Paraná
