= Rio Negro (Tocantins) =

Location
- Country: Brazil

Physical characteristics
- Source
  - location: Tocantins state
- Mouth: Perdida River
  - coordinates: 9°19′10″S 47°43′26″W

Rio Negro (Portuguese for "black river") is a river of Tocantins state in central Brazil.

== See also ==
- List of rivers of Tocantins
