= Formiga River (Tocantins) =

Location
- Country: Brazil

Physical characteristics
- Source
  - location: Tocantins state
- Mouth: Tocantins River
  - coordinates: 11°15′45″S 48°26′59″W

The Formiga River is a river of Tocantins state in central Brazil.

== See also ==
- List of rivers of Tocantins
- Brazil
