= Vermelho River (Manuel Alves Grande River tributary) =

Location
- Country: Brazil

Physical characteristics
- Source
  - location: Tocantins state
- Mouth: Manuel Alves Grande River

The Vermelho River is a river of Tocantins state in central Brazil. It is a tributary of the Manuel Alves Grande River.

== See also ==
- List of rivers of Tocantins
