= Cana Brava River (Santa Tereza River tributary) =

Location
- Country: Brazil

Physical characteristics
- Source
  - location: Tocantins state
- Mouth
  - location: Santa Tereza River
  - coordinates: 12°17′S 48°43′W

The Cana Brava River is a river of Tocantins & Goiás states in central Brazil. It is a tributary of the Santa Tereza River.

== See also ==
- List of rivers of Tocantins
