= Cantão State Park =

State park in Tocantins, Brazil

- Parque Estadual do Cantão
- IUCN category II (national park)
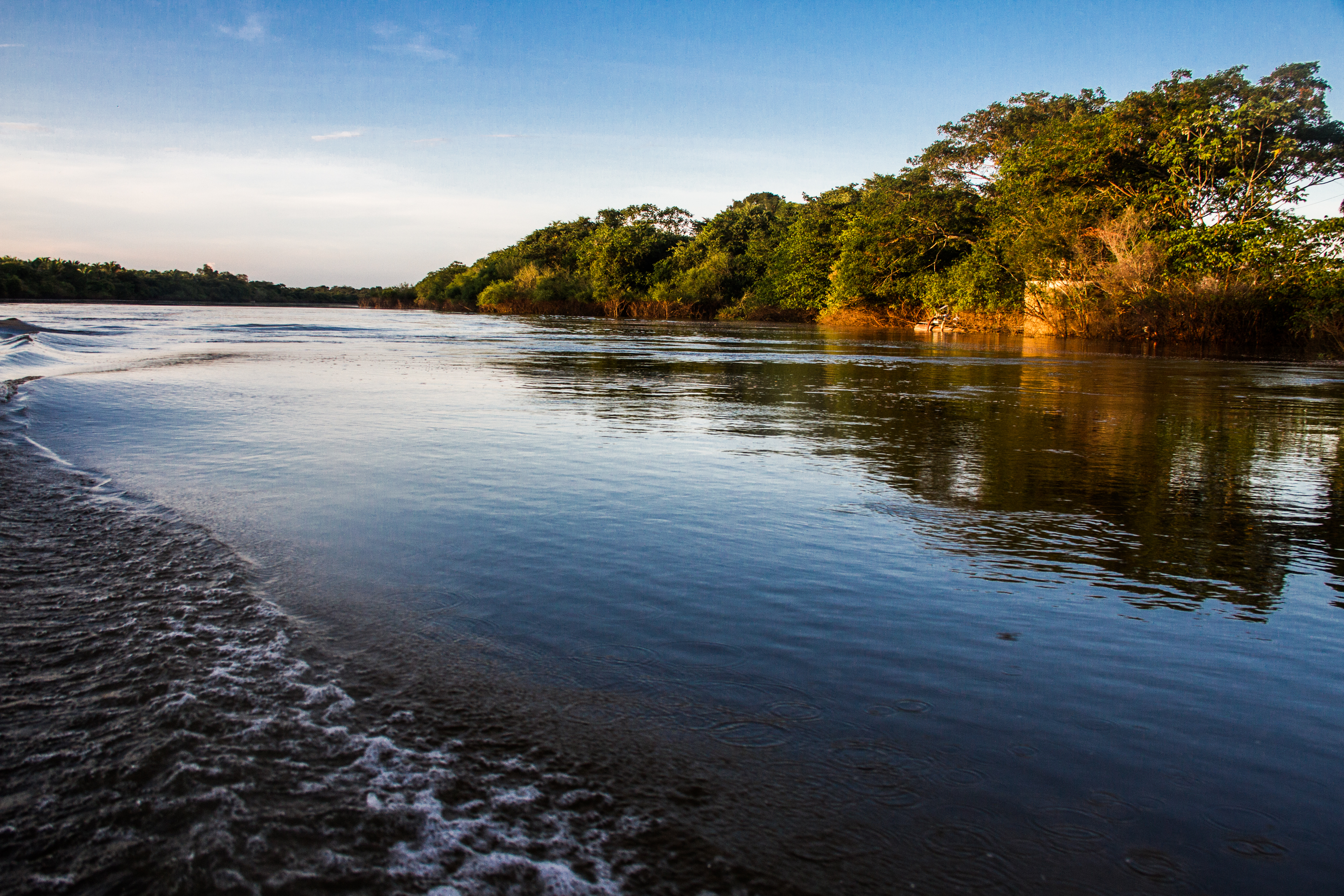
- Javaés River on the southern boundary

- Location within Brazil
- Nearest city: Pium, Tocantins
- Coordinates: 9°41′24″S 50°04′05″W
- Area: 90,018 hectares (222,440 acres)
- Designation: State park
- Created: 14 July 1998
- Administrator: Instituto Natureza do Tocantins

The Cantão State Park (Portuguese: Parque Estadual do Cantão) is a state park in the state of Tocantins, Brazil. It protects the Cantão wetlands, an area of igapó flooded forest in the ecotone where the Amazon rainforest merges into the cerrado.

== Location ==
The Cantão State Park is located in the municipality of Pium, Tocantins. It has an area of 90,018 hectares (222,440 acres). The park is bounded to the west by the Araguaia River, which forms the border with the state of Pará. The Javaés River separates the state park from the Araguaia National Park to the south. It is bounded by the Ilha do Bananal / Cantão Environmental Protection Area to the east. The park would be in the proposed South Amazon Ecotones Ecological Corridor.

== History ==
The Cantão State Park was created by state law 996 of 14 July 1998 with an area of 88,928.88 hectares (219,748.0 acres). The primary purpose is protecting fauna, flora and natural resources with tourism potential to ensure their rational, sustainable use compatible with preserving the local ecosystems. The deliberative council was created in the same law. The boundaries were altered by law 1.319 of 4 April 2002 to contain an area of 90,017.89 hectares (222,439.1 acres).

The management plan was approved on 25 August 2005. Ordnance 740 defined rules to be followed for the Projeto Quelônios for turtle conservation. The buffer zone was defined in 2005. The revised management plan was approved on 3 August 2016. As of 2016 the park was supported by the Amazon Region Protected Areas Program.

== Environment ==
The Cantão is a broad alluvial plain between the Araguaia River to the west and the Coco River to the east. At one time the lower Coco was probably a meander of the Javaés, in turn a branch of the Araguaia. The region is full of abandoned channels and lakes. Floods connect the lakes in the rainy season for 2–6 months starting in October to form a single body of water, so species adapted to flooding are prevalent.

The Cantão holds an ecotone between the Amazon and the cerrado, and includes species typical of both biomes. The lakes are nurseries for fish, turtles and alligators. One survey identified 317 species of birds, including the endemic bananal antbird (Cercomacra ferdinandi) and Araguaia Spinetail (Synallaxis simoni). There is a large population of jaguars (Panthera onca).

== Facilities ==
The park has an energy supply, guardhouse, visitor center, gazebo, accommodation, parking, staff residence, dock, vehicles and boats. The park supports camping and recreation as well as scientific research. It runs various educational activities such as lectures, workshops, training courses, video shows and monitored trails.

== Sources ==
- Ayres, José Márcio; Da Fonseca, Gustavo A. B.; Rylands, Anthony B.; Queiroz, Helder L.; Pinto, Luiz Paulo; Masterson, Donald; Cavalcanti, Roberto B. (2005), Os Corredores Ecológicos das Florestas Tropicais do Brasil (PDF) (in Portuguese), Sociedade Civil Mamirauá, archived from the original (PDF) on 2016-07-31
- Full list: PAs supported by ARPA, ARPA
- PES do Cantão (in Portuguese), ISA: Instituto Socioambiental
