= Das Balsas River (Tocantins) =

Balsas River
- Location within Brazil
- Native name: Rio Balsas (Portuguese)

Location
- Country: Brazil

Physical characteristics
- Source
  - location: Tocantins state
- Mouth
  - location: Tocantins
  - coordinates: 9.88209°S 47.84045°W

Basin features
- River system: Tocantins River

The Balsas River is a river of Tocantins state in central Brazil, a tributary of the Do Sono River.

The river basin includes part of the 707,079 hectares (1,747,230 acres) Serra Geral do Tocantins Ecological Station, a strictly protected conservation unit created in 2001 to preserve an area of the Cerrado.

== See also ==
- List of rivers of Tocantins
