= Serra da Mesa Dam =

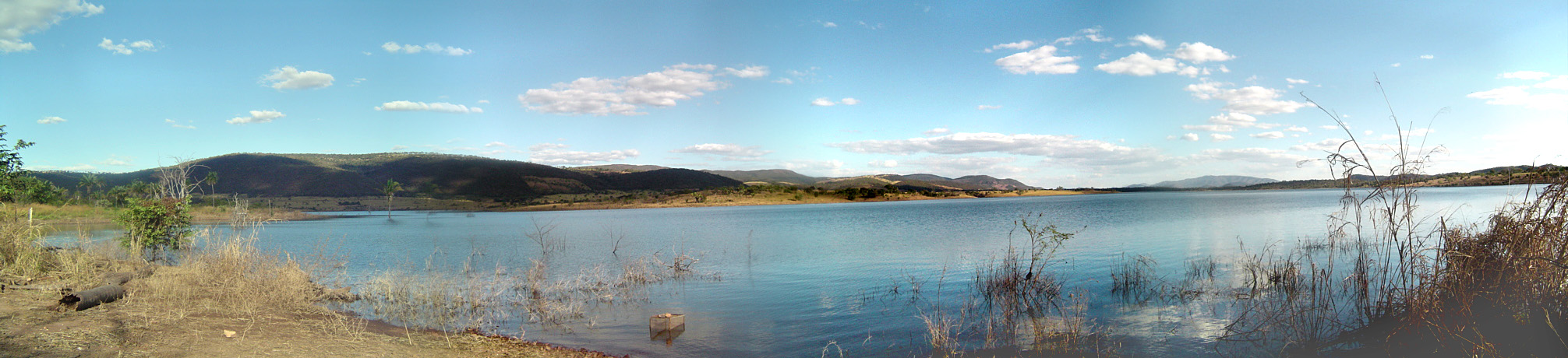

- Location within Brazil
- Official name: Usina de Serra da Mesa
- Location: Minaçu, Goiás, Brazil
- Coordinates: 13°50′03″S 48°18′16″W
- Construction began: 1986
- Opening date: 1998
- Construction cost: $1.1 billion USD
- Operator: Eletrobrás Furnas

Dam and spillways
- Type of dam: Embankment
- Impounds: Tocantins River
- Height: 154 m (505 ft)
- Length: 1,500 m (4,900 ft)
- Dam volume: 12,057,558 m^{3} (425,808,600 cu ft)
- Spillway type: Service, gate-controlled
- Spillway capacity: 15,000 m^{3}/s (530,000 cu ft/s)

Reservoir
- Creates: Serra da Mesa Reservoir
- Total capacity: 54,400,000,000 m^{3} (44,100,000 acre⋅ft)
- Surface area: 1,784 km^{2} (689 sq mi)

Power Station
- Commission date: 1998
- Turbines: 3 x Francis-type
- Installed capacity: 1,275 MW (1,710,000 hp)
- Annual generation: 6,300 GWh (23,000 TJ)

The Serra da Mesa Dam, once known as Sao Felix, is an embankment dam on the Tocantins River near Minaçu in Goiás, Brazil. The dam serves an associated hydroelectric power plant with a 1,275 megawatts (1,710,000 hp) installed capacity. The dam creates the largest reservoir by volume in Brazil.

== Background ==
Eletrobrás Furnas began studies of the upper Tocantins River in 1981 and proposed constructing two large dams, one was at Serra da Mesa which had good geomechanical conditions. After years of studies, construction on the dam and power station began in 1986. On October 24, 1996, the dam began to inundate and create its reservoir and it was full in 1998; around the same time, the power station's generators became operational.

The dam is one of seven on the Tocantins River. The other six dams are: Tucuruí Dam (one of the world's largest), Cana Brava dam, São Salvador dam, Peixe Angical dam, Luiz Eduardo Magalhães (Lajeado) dam, Estreito dam, and Tucuruí dam).

== Dam and reservoir ==
The Serra da Mesa Dam is a 1,500-metre (4,900 ft) long and 154-metre (505 ft) tall earth-fill embankment dam with a clay core and in total contains 12,057,558 cubic metres (425,808,600 cu ft) of material. The reservoir created by the dam has a capacity of 54,400,000,000 cubic metres (44,100,000 acre⋅ft) and surface area of 1,784 square kilometres (689 sq mi). Of the reservoir's volume, 43,250,000,000 cubic metres (35,060,000 acre⋅ft) is active storage. The dam supports a spillway with five floodgates that are 15 metres (49 ft) wide and 20.4 metres (67 ft) high each. In total, the spillway has a 15,000 cubic metres per second (530,000 cu ft/s) discharge capacity.

== Serra da Mesa Hydroelectric Power Station ==
The dam supports the Serra da Mesa Hydroelectric Power Station, an underground power station and hydraulic circuit. Before reaching the turbines, water enters the intake near the dam's left abutment and proceeds along three 24-metre (79 ft) long intake tunnels before reaching three 126-metre (413 ft) long and 10-metre (33 ft) diameter penstocks. Water then reaches the Francis turbines which power three 425 megawatts (570,000 hp) generators. After exiting the turbines, the water is discharged from the power house via one 500-metre (1,600 ft) long tailrace tunnel. The power house is 137 metres (449 ft) long, 67 metres (220 ft) high and 30 metres (98 ft) wide. To mitigate water hammer when starting and stopping the turbines, it contains a 69-metre (226 ft) long 20-metre (66 ft) wide and 65-metre (213 ft) tall surge chamber with a 91,000 cubic metres (3,200,000 cu ft) capacity.

== Environmental impact ==
The Serra da Mesa Dam was sharply criticized by environmentalists before and during construction. Organizations, such as the International Rivers Network criticized the dam and its reservoir for destroying a vast area of flora and fauna along with destroying the habitat of endangered species. In addition, the dam was criticized for flooding archeological sites and $15 million worth of timber that was not removed prior to flooding.

== See also ==
- Tucuruí dam
