= Capivara River (Santa Tereza River tributary) =

Location
- Country: Brazil

Physical characteristics
- Source
  - location: Tocantins state
- Mouth: Santa Tereza River

The Capivara River is a river of Tocantins state in central Brazil. It is a tributary of the Santa Tereza River.

== See also ==
- List of rivers of Tocantins
