= Pium =

Municipality in Tocantins, Brazil

Coordinates: 10.4428°S 49.1819°W

- Municipality
- Flag

- Location in Tocantins
- Country: Brazil
- Region: Northern
- State: Tocantins
- Mesoregion: Ocidental do Tocantins

Population (2020)
  - Total: 7,743
- Time zone: UTC−3 (BRT)

Pium is a municipality in the state of Tocantins in the Northern region of Brazil.

The municipality contains the 90,018-hectare (222,440-acre) Cantão State Park, created in 1998. It contains 21.56% of the 1,678,000-hectare (4,150,000-acre) Ilha do Bananal / Cantão Environmental Protection Area, created in 1997.

== See also ==
- List of municipalities in Tocantins
