= Crixás River (Tocantins) =

Location
- Country: Brazil

Physical characteristics
- Source
  - location: Tocantins state
- Mouth: Tocantins River
  - coordinates: 11°02′24″S 48°33′41″W

The Crixás River is a river of Tocantins state in central Brazil.

== See also ==
- List of rivers of Tocantins
