= Vermelho River (Perdida River tributary) =

Location
- Country: Brazil

Physical characteristics
- Source
  - location: Tocantins state
- Mouth: Perdida River

The Vermelho River is a river of Tocantins state in central Brazil. It is a tributary of the Perdida River.

== See also ==
- List of rivers of Tocantins
