= Mosquito River (Tocantins) =

Location
- Country: Brazil

Physical characteristics
- Source
  - location: Tocantins state
- Mouth
  - location: Palma River
  - coordinates: 12°50′S 46°25′W

The Mosquito River is a river of Tocantins state in central Brazil, and the border of Goiás state.

== See also ==
- List of rivers of Tocantins
