= Lontra River =

Location
- Country: Brazil

Physical characteristics
- Source
  - location: Tocantins state

The Lontra River is a river of Tocantins state in central Brazil and a tributary of the Araguaia River.

== See also ==
- List of rivers of Tocantins
