= Piranhas River (upper Araguaia River tributary) =

Location
- Country: Brazil

Physical characteristics
- Source
  - location: Tocantins state
- Mouth: Araguaia River

The Piranhas River is a river of Tocantins state in central Brazil. The Piranhas discharges into the Araguaia River in northern Tocantins state near the municipality of Araguatins. Both the Araguaia and the Piranhas form part of the Tocantins basin.

== See also ==
- List of rivers of Tocantins
