= Bandeira River (Chopim River tributary) =

River in Brazil

- Location of the mouth in Brazil

Location
- Country: Brazil

Physical characteristics
- Source
  - location: Paraná state
- Mouth: Chopim River
  - coordinates: 26°24′33″S 51°55′6″W

The Bandeira River is a river of Paraná state in southern Brazil. It is a tributary of the Chopim River.

== See also ==
- List of rivers of Paraná
