= Vermelho River (Araguaia River tributary) =

Location
- Country: Brazil

Physical characteristics
- Source
  - location: Goiás state
- Mouth
  - location: Araguaia River
  - coordinates: 14.9267°S 51.0898°W

The Vermelho River is a river in the state of Goiás in central Brazil. It flows into the Araguaia River near Aruanã.

== See also ==
- List of rivers of Goiás
