= San Antonio River (South America) =

Coordinates: 25°35′17″S 53°59′27″W

Location
- Countries: Argentina and Brazil

Physical characteristics
- Mouth
  - location: Iguazu River

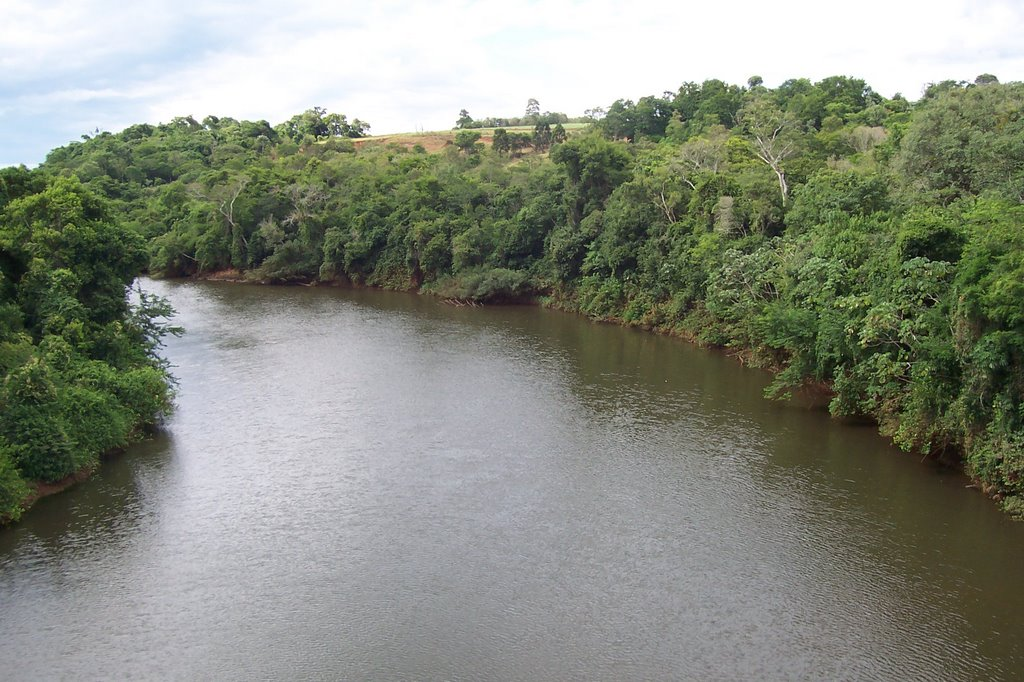

The San Antonio River (Spanish, Río San Antonio, Portuguese, Rio Santo Antônio; also called San Antonio Guazú) is a tributary of the Iguazu River. The San Antonio River forms the border between Misiones Province in Argentina and Paraná State in Brazil. South of the San Antonio's source near Barracão, the international border continues south along the Pepiri-Guazu River, which forms the border between Misiones Province and Brazil's Santa Catarina State.

== See also ==
- List of rivers of Argentina
- List of rivers of Brazil
