= Xavante River (Tocantins) =

Location
- Country: Brazil

Physical characteristics
- Source
  - location: Tocantins state
  - coordinates: 11.74837°S 49.16659°W
- Mouth
  - coordinates: 11.38945°S 49.67798°W

The Xavante River is a river of Tocantins state in central Brazil.

== See also ==
- List of rivers of Tocantins
