= Caracol River (Tocantins) =

River in Tocantins, Brazil

Location
- Country: Brazil

Physical characteristics
- Source
  - location: Tocantins state

The Caracol River is a river in the state of Tocantins in central Brazil.

== See also ==
- List of rivers of Tocantins
