= Água Fria River (Braço Menor) =

Location
- Country: Brazil

Physical characteristics
- Source
  - location: Tocantins state
- Mouth: Braço Menor do Rio Araguaia River
  - coordinates: 12°04′29″S 50°00′51″W

The Água Fria River is a river of Tocantins state in central Brazil. It is a tributary of the Braço Menor do Rio Araguaia River.

== See also ==
- List of rivers of Tocantins
