= Do Meio River (Bahia, Peruípe River tributary) =

Location
- Country: Brazil

Physical characteristics
- Source
  - location: Bahia state
- Mouth: Peruípe River
  - coordinates: 17°47′S 39°47′W

The Do Meio River is a river of Bahia state in eastern Brazil. It is a tributary of the Peruípe River (Braço Sul).

== See also ==
- List of rivers of Bahia
