= Pau-Seco =

Pau-Seco River

Location
- Country: Brazil

Physical characteristics
- Source
  - location: Goiás state
- Mouth
  - location: Tocantins state
  - coordinates: 12°25′S 49°33′W

The Pau-Seco River is a river of Goiás and Tocantins states in central Brazil.

== See also ==
- List of rivers of Tocantins
- List of rivers of Goiás
