= Caiapó River (Tocantins) =

Location
- Country: Brazil

Physical characteristics
- Source
  - location: Tocantins state

The Caiapó River is a river of Tocantins state in central Brazil. Part of the Tocantins basin, the Caiapó is a tributary of Araguaia River.

== See also ==
- List of rivers of Tocantins
