= Piranhas River (lower Araguaia River tributary) =

Location
- Country: Brazil

Physical characteristics
- Source
  - location: Tocantins state
- Mouth: Araguaia River

The Piranhas River is a river of Tocantins state in central Brazil. The Piranhas joins the Araguaia River in the west-central area of Tocantins state near the municipality of Araguacema.

== See also ==
- List of rivers of Tocantins
