= Manuel Alves Pequeno River =

Coordinates: 7°55′37″S 47°57′05″W

Location
- Country: Brazil

Physical characteristics
- Source
  - location: Tocantins state

The Manuel Alves Pequeno River is a river of Tocantins state in central Brazil.

== See also ==
- List of rivers of Tocantins
