= Bezerra River (Tocantins) =

Location
- Country: Brazil

Physical characteristics
- Source
  - location: Tocantins state
- Mouth
  - location: Paranã River
  - coordinates: 13°16′S 47°23′W

The Bezerra River is a river of Tocantins state in central Brazil, and the border of Goiás state.

== See also ==
- List of rivers of Tocantins
