= São Luís River =

River in Brazil

Rio São Luís is an intermittent river in the state of Acre, Brazil, located in the Juruá hydrographic basin. The river is considered sacred by locals, who do pilgrimages to the sanctuary at its banks and baptisms in its waters.
