= Bonito River (Tocantins) =

Location
- Country: Brazil

Physical characteristics
- Source
  - location: Tocantins state

The Bonito River is a river of Tocantins state in central Brazil.

== See also ==
- List of rivers of Tocantins
