= Espingarda River =

Coordinates: 10°01′12″S 47°12′14″W

Location
- Country: Brazil

Physical characteristics
- Source
  - location: Tocantins state

The Espingarda River is a river of Tocantins state in central Brazil.

== See also ==
- List of rivers of Tocantins
