= Formoso River (Tocantins) =

- Location within Brazil

Location
- Country: Brazil

Physical characteristics
- Source: Tocantins state
- Mouth: Javaés River
  - coordinates: 10.573°S 49.942°W
  - elevation: 180 m (590 ft)
- Length: 550 km (340 mi)

The Formoso River is a river of Tocantins state in central Brazil.

== See also ==
- List of rivers of Tocantins
