= Manuel Alves da Natividade River =

Coordinates: 11°18′38″S 48°27′25″W

Location
- Country: Brazil

Physical characteristics
- Source
  - location: Tocantins state

The Manuel Alves da Natividade River is a river of Tocantins state in central Brazil.

== See also ==
- List of rivers of Tocantins
