= Riozinho River (Braço Menor) =

Location
- Country: Brazil

Physical characteristics
- Source
  - location: Tocantins state
- Mouth: Braco Menor do Rio Araguaia River

The Riozinho River is a river of Tocantins state in central Brazil. It is a tributary of the Braco Menor do Rio Araguaia River

== See also ==
- List of rivers of Tocantins
