= Mocambo River =

River in Tocantins and Goiás, Brazil

Location
- Country: Brazil

Physical characteristics
- Source
  - location: Goiás state
- Mouth
  - location: Tocantins state
  - coordinates: 13°9′S 48°9′W

The Mocambo River is a river of Tocantins and Goiás states in central Brazil.

== See also ==
- List of rivers of Tocantins
- List of rivers of Goiás
