= Manuel Alves Grande River =

Coordinates: 7°26′32″S 47°35′18″W

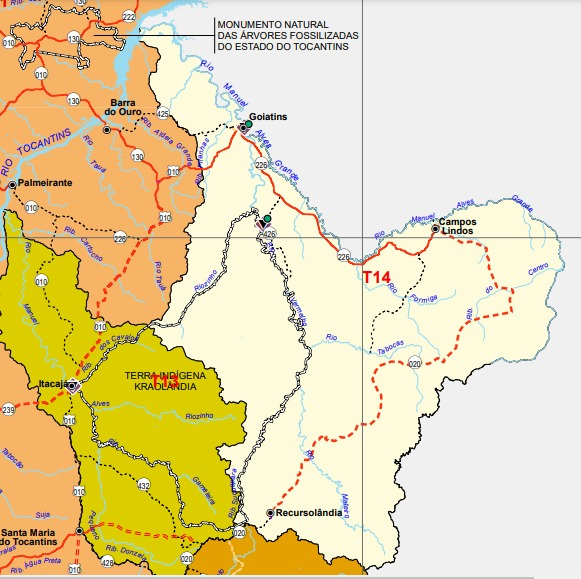
- Area bathed by the Manuel Alves Grande river basin

Location
- Country: Brazil

Physical characteristics
- Source
  - location: Tocantins and Maranhão states
- Mouth: Tocantins River
- Length: 234,87 km

The Manuel Alves Grande River is a river of Tocantins and Maranhão states, dividing the north and northeast regions of Brazil. It is a tributary of the Tocantins River.

== See also ==
- List of rivers of Tocantins
- List of rivers of Maranhão
