= Rio Verde (Tocantins) =

Location
- Country: Brazil

Physical characteristics
- Source
  - location: Tocantins state
- Mouth
  - coordinates: 12°24′S 50°9′W

Rio Verde (Portuguese for "green river") is a river of Tocantins state in central Brazil.

== See also ==
- List of rivers of Tocantins
