= Bananal River (Tocantins) =

Coordinates: 8°39′3.6″S 49°12′54.6″W

Location
- Country: Brazil

Physical characteristics
- Source
  - location: Tocantins state

The Bananal River is a river of Tocantins state in central Brazil.

== See also ==
- List of rivers of Tocantins
