= Chopim River =

River in Brazil

Coordinates: 25°34′11″S 53°04′23″W

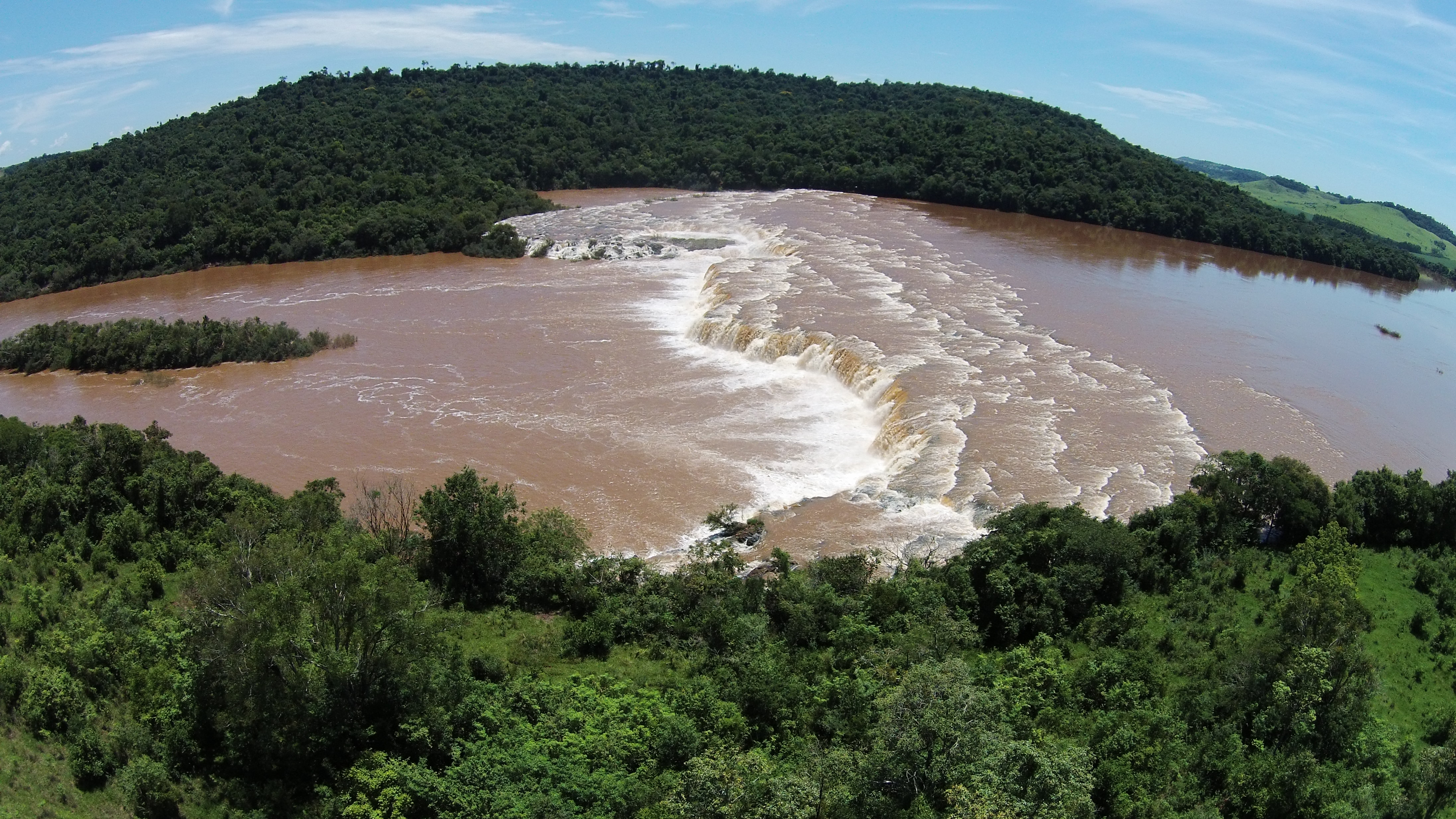

Location
- Country: Brazil

Physical characteristics
- Source
  - location: Paraná state

The Chopim River is a river of Paraná state in southern Brazil.

== See also ==
- List of rivers of Paraná
