= Igarapé Riozinho =

Coordinates: 9°38′S 67°00′W

Location
- Country: Brazil

Physical characteristics
- Source
  - location: Acre state

Igarapé Riozinho is a river of Acre state in western Brazil.

== See also ==
- List of rivers of Acre
