= Piquiri River (Paraná) =

River in Brazil

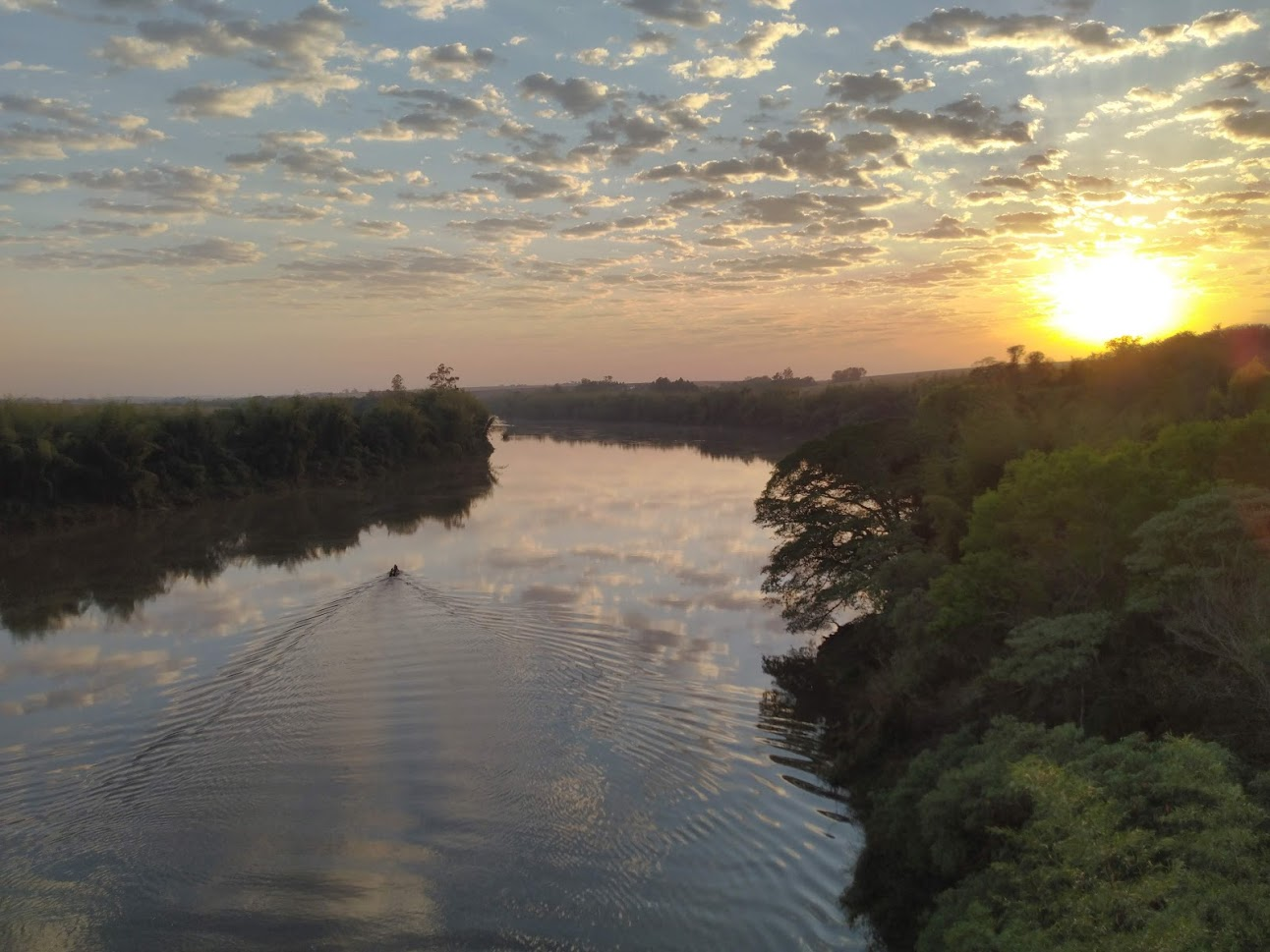

- Location within Brazil
- Native name: Rio Piquiri (Portuguese)

Location
- Country: Brazil

Physical characteristics
- Source
  - location: Paraná state
- Mouth
  - coordinates: 24.027110°S 54.093685°W
- Length: 660 km (410 mi)
- Basin size: 24,156 km^{2} (9,327 mi^{2})
- Discharge
  - location: mouth
  - average: 508.4 m^{3}/s (17,950 cu ft/s)

Basin features
- River system: Paraná River

The Piquiri River (Portuguese: Rio Piquiri) is a river of Paraná state in southern Brazil. It is a tributary of the Paraná River. Its name is officially spelled Piquiri, with variants including Peguirí, Pequir, Pequirí, Pequiry, and Piquiry.

The Azul River is one of the tributaries of the Piquiri River.

== See also ==
- List of rivers of Paraná
- Tributaries of the Río de la Plata
