= Santa Tereza River =

Santa Tereza River Santa Teresa River

Location
- Country: Brazil
- State: Tocantins, Goiás

Physical characteristics
- Mouth: Tocantins River
  - coordinates: 11°47′20″S 48°37′04″W
- Length: 370 km (230 mi)

The Santa Tereza River is a river of Tocantins and Goiás states in central Brazil.

== See also ==
- List of rivers of Goiás
- List of rivers of Tocantins
