= Arraias do Araguaia River =

Location
- Country: Brazil

Physical characteristics
- Source
  - location: Pará state
- Mouth
  - coordinates: 7°45′S 49°27′W

The Arraias do Araguaia River is a river of Pará state in north-central Brazil.

== See also ==
- List of rivers of Pará
