= Bagagem River (Tocantins) =

Coordinates: 11°36′19″S 48°10′25″W

Location
- Country: Brazil

Physical characteristics
- Source
  - location: Tocantins state

The Bagagem River is a river of Tocantins state in central Brazil.

== See also ==
- List of rivers of Tocantins
