= Palma River =

River in Brazil

Coordinates: 12°36′48″S 47°53′19″W

Location
- Country: Brazil

Physical characteristics
- Source
  - location: Tocantins state

The Palma River is a river of Tocantins state in central Brazil.

== See also ==
- List of rivers of Tocantins
