= Perdida River =

Coordinates: 9°20′24″S 47°54′17″W

Location
- Country: Brazil

Physical characteristics
- Source
  - location: Tocantins state

The Perdida River is a river of Tocantins state in central Brazil.

== See also ==
- List of rivers of Tocantins
