= Javaés River =

Javaés River ♂ Bero Biòwa, ♀ Bèraku Bikòwa (Javaé), Braço Menor do Rio Araguaia
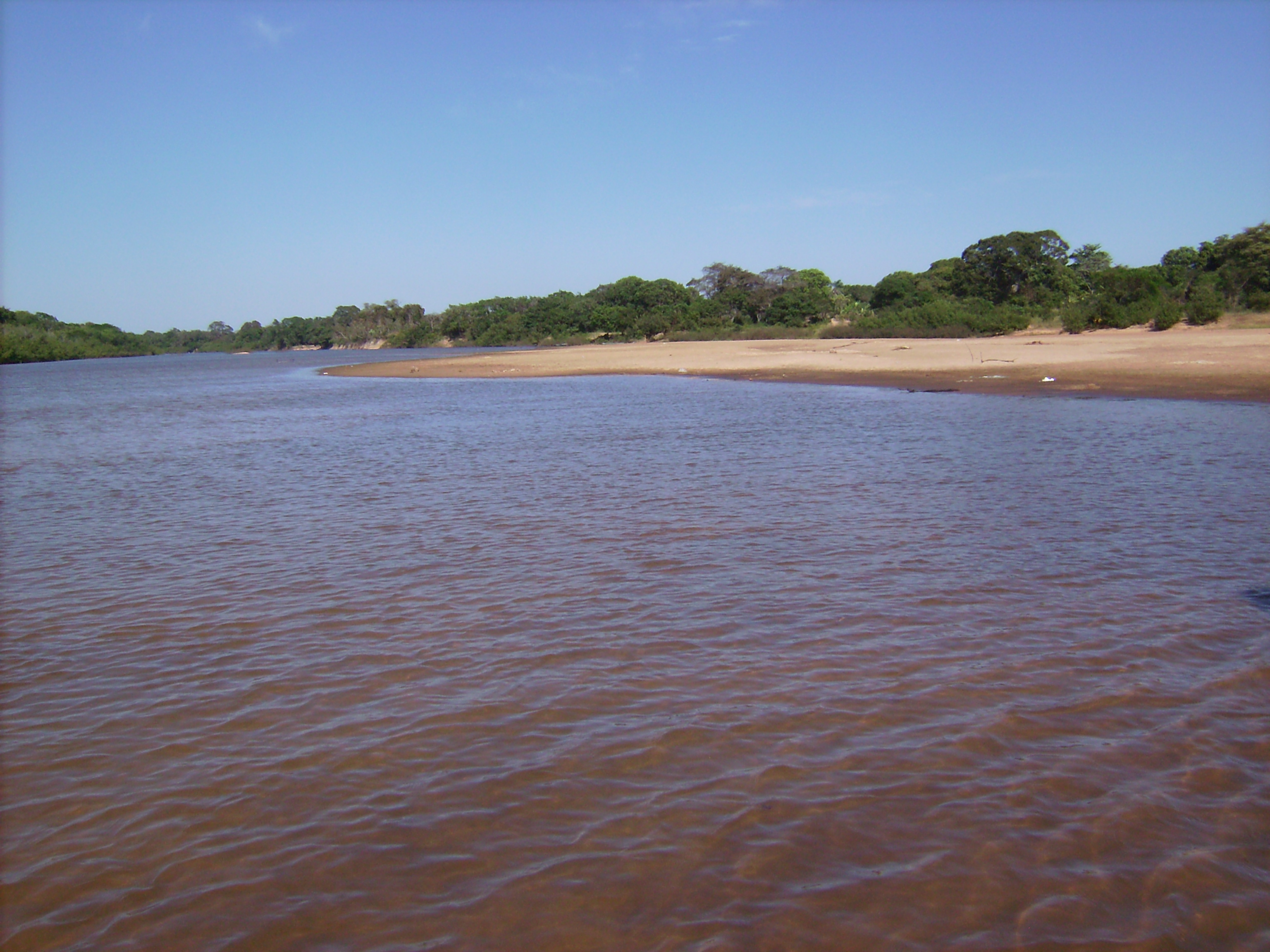

- Location in Brazil
- Native name: Rio Javaés (Portuguese)

Location
- Country: Brazil

Physical characteristics
- Source
  - location: Tocantins state
- Mouth
  - coordinates: 9°50′30″S 50°12′18″W

Basin features
- River system: Araguaia River

The Javaés River (Portuguese: Rio Javaés or Braço Menor do Rio Araguaia, Javaé: ♂ Bero Biòwa [beˈɾo bɪɔˈwa], ♀ Bèraku Bikòwa [bɛɾaˈku bɪkɔˈwa]) is a river of Tocantins state in central Brazil and part of the Tocantins basin. It is a tributary of the Araguaia River. Between the two rivers there is an island called Bananal, the biggest fluvial island in the world.

The Javaés River separates the Cantão State Park to the north from the Araguaia National Park to the south.

== See also ==
- List of rivers of Tocantins
