= Tocantins basin =

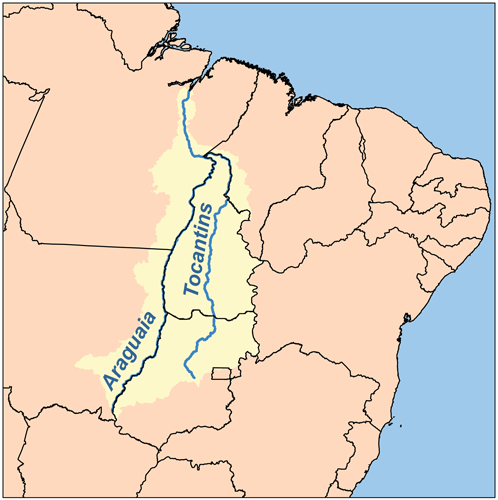
Tocantins basin.

The Tocantins basin, or Araguaia-Tocantins basin, is a Brazilian river basin, almost entirely located between the 2ºS and 18ºS parallels and the 46ºW and 56ºW meridians. The main rivers in the basin are Tocantins and Araguaia.

The basin extends to the states of Tocantins and Goiás (58%), Mato Grosso (24%), Pará (13%), Maranhão (4%), in addition to the Federal District (1%). It is the largest hydrographic basin entirely Brazilian.

For water resource management purposes, it is inserted in the Tocantins-Araguaia hydrographic region.

== General characteristics of the basin ==
Its length is approximately 2,500 km, from its water source, in the Serra Dourada, to the mouth, in the bay of Marajó (Pará). It has an elongated configuration in the longitudinal direction, which follows the two fluvial axes — Tocantins and Araguaia — which join at the northern end of the hydrographic basin. The Tocantins River flows into the Marajoara Gulf (or Marajó Bay), just after the Pará River, which flows south of the island of Marajó, being one of the formators of the Great Amazon Estuary. The Pará River is considered a distributary channel, that is, a link between the Tocantins River and the Amazon Delta.

The relief is considered a monotope, with altitudes varying between 350m and 500m, except in the river springs, where it reaches more than 1,000m. In the Tucuruí region, altitudes are less than 10m.

The Tocantins basin is the second largest in energy production in Brazil. The average discharge from the hydrographic basin, in Tucuruí, is estimated at 12,000 m³/s, with the contribution of the Araguaia and Tocantins rivers being similar, and that of the Itacaiúnas River, much lower (600 m³/s).

The basin covers approximately 767,000 km² (about 7.5% of the national territory) distributed, mainly between the Araguaia (382,000 km²), Tocantins (343,000 km²) and Itacaiúnas (42,000 km²) rivers, the largest contributor to the lower Tocantins course.
