= Tocantins River =

River in Brazil

Tocantins River Pyti (Parkatêjê)
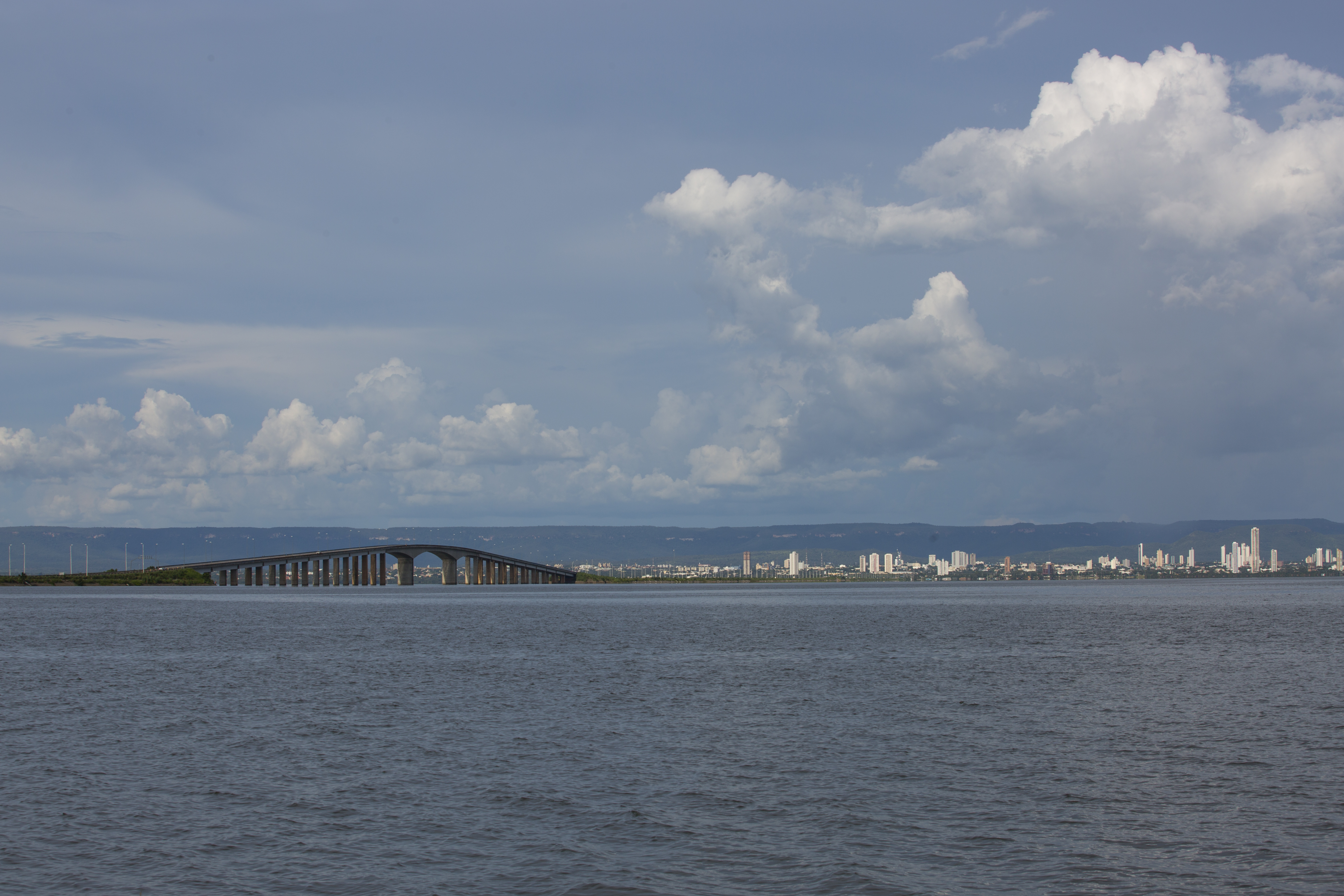
- Tocantins River and Fernando Henrique Cardoso bridge

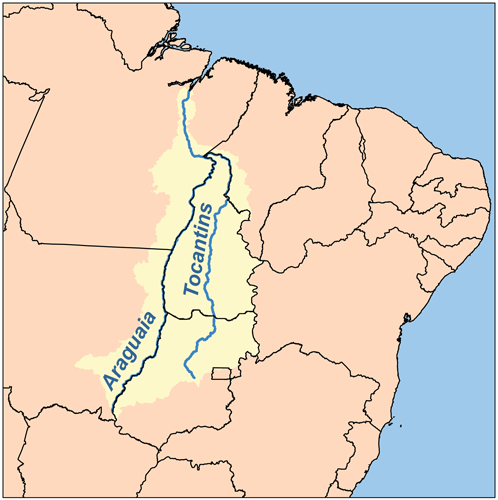
- Map of the Araguaia/Tocantins Watershed
- Native name: Rio Tocantins (Portuguese)

Location
- Country: Brazil

Physical characteristics
- Source: Serra da Mesa Reservoir
  - location: Minaçu, Goiás
  - coordinates: 13°50′03″S 48°18′16″W
  - elevation: 443 m (1,453 ft)
- Mouth: Marajó Bay
  - location: Igarapé-Miri, Pará
  - coordinates: 1°45′S 49°10′W
  - elevation: 0 m (0 ft)
- Length: 2,640 km (1,640 mi)
- Basin size: 764,183 km^{2} (295,053 mi^{2})
- Discharge
  - location: mouth
  - average: 11,796 m^{3}/s (416,600 cu ft/s)

Basin features
- River system: Tocantins basin
- Tributaries
  - left: Paranã, Sono River
  - right: Araguaia River, Itacaiúnas River

The Tocantins River (Portuguese: Rio Tocantins Portuguese pronunciation: [ˈʁi.u tokɐ̃ˈtʃĩs, tu-], Parkatêjê: Pyti [pɨˈti]) is a river in Brazil, the central fluvial artery of the country. In the Tupi language, its name means "toucan's beak" (Tukã for "toucan" and Ti for "beak"). It runs from south to north for about 2,450 km (1,520 mi). While sometimes included in definitions of the Amazon basin, the Tocantins is not a branch of the Amazon River, since its waters flow into the Atlantic Ocean via an eastern channel of the Amazon Delta, alongside those of the Amazon proper. It flows through four Brazilian states (Goiás, Tocantins, Maranhão, and Pará) and gives its name to one of Brazil's newest states, formed in 1988 from what was until then the northern portion of Goiás.

The Tocantins is one of the largest clearwater rivers in South America.

== Course ==
It rises in the mountainous district known as the Pireneus, west of the Federal District, but its western tributary, the Araguaia River, has its extreme southern headwaters on the slopes of the Serra dos Caiapós. The Araguaia flows 1,670 km (1,040 mi) before its confluence with the Tocantins, to which it is almost equal in volume. Besides its main tributary, the Rio das Mortes, the Araguaia has twenty smaller branches, offering many miles of canoe navigation. In finding its way to the lowlands, it breaks frequently into waterfalls and rapids, or winds violently through rocky gorges, until, at a point about 160 km (99 mi) above its junction with the Tocantins, it saws its way across a rocky dyke for 20 km (12 mi) in roaring cataracts.

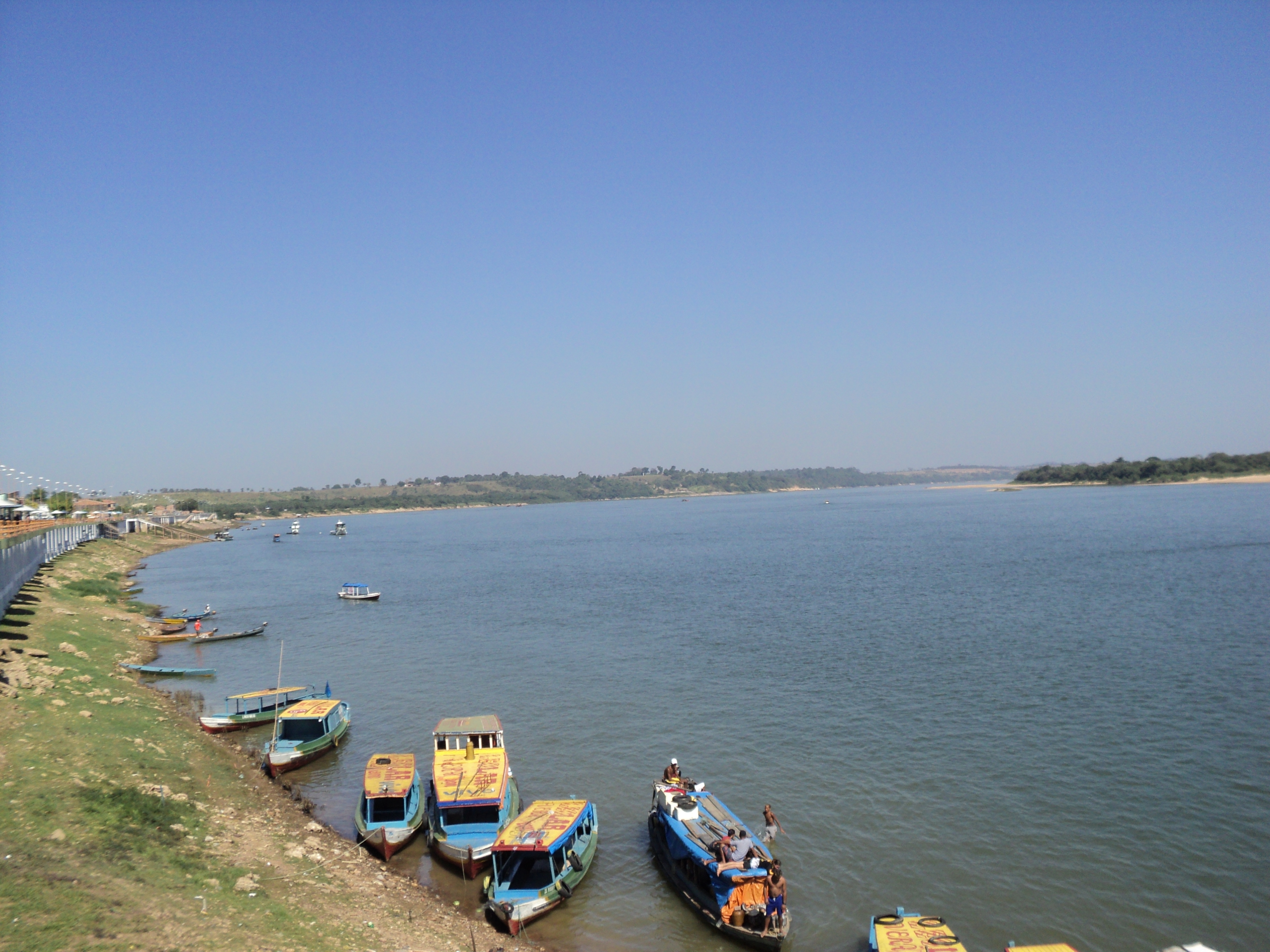
Boats on the Tocantins

Two other tributaries, called the Maranhão and Paranatinga, collect an immense volume of water from the highlands which surround them, especially on the south and south-east. Between the latter and the confluence with the Araguaia, the Tocantins is occasionally obstructed by rocky barriers which cross it almost at a right angle.

== Fauna ==
The Tocantins basin (which includes the Araguaia River) is the home of several large aquatic mammals such as Amazonian manatee, Araguaian river dolphin and tucuxi, and larger reptiles such as black caiman, spectacled caiman and yellow-spotted river turtle.

The Tocantins River Basin has a high richness of fish species, although it is relatively low by Amazon basin standards. More than 350 fish species have been registered, including more than 175 endemics. The most species rich families are Characidae (tetras and allies), Loricariidae (pleco catfish and allies) and Rivulidae (South American killifish). While most species essentially are of Amazonian origin, there are also some showing a connection with the Paraná and São Francisco rivers. The Tocantins and these two rivers flow in different directions, but all have their source in the Brazilian Plateau in a region where a low watershed allows some exchange between them. There are several fish species that migrate along the Tocantins to spawn, but this has been restricted by the dams. Following the construction of the massive Tucuruí Dam, the flow of the river changed. Some species have been adversely affected and there has been a substantial reduction in species richness in parts of the river.

The São Domingos karst in the upper Tocantins basin is home to an unusually high number of cavefish species (more than any other region in the Americas): Ancistrus cryptophthalmus, several Ituglanis species, Pimelodella spelaea, Aspidoras mephisto, an undescribed Cetopsorhamdia species and Eigenmannia vicentespelaea. The last is the only known cave-adapted knifefish and one of only two known non-catfish in caves of the South American mainland (the other is the characid Stygichthys typhlops).

In its lower reaches, the Tocantins separates the Tocantins–Araguaia–Maranhão moist forests ecoregion to the east from the Xingu–Tocantins–Araguaia moist forests ecoregion to the west. It acts as a barrier that prevents dispersal of flora and fauna between these ecoregions.

== Dams ==
Downstream from the Araguaia confluence, in the state of Pará, the river used to have many cataracts and rapids, but they were flooded in the early 1980s by the artificial lake created by the Tucuruí Dam, one of the world's largest. When the second phase of the Tucuruí project was completed on November 30, 2010, a system of locks called Eclusas do Tucuruí was established with the goal of making a long extension of the river navigable.

In total there are seven dams on the river (Serra da Mesa dam, Cana Brava dam, São Salvador dam, Peixe Angical dam, Luiz Eduardo Magalhães (Lajeado) dam, Estreito dam, and Tucuruí dam), of which the largest are the Tucuruí and the Serra da Mesa dam.

== Geology ==
The flat, broad valleys, composed of sand and clay, of both the Tocantins and its Araguaia branch are overlooked by steep bluffs. They are the margins of the great sandstone plateaus, from 300 to 600 metres (980 to 1,970 ft) elevation above sea-level, through which the rivers have eroded their deep beds. Around the estuary of the Tocantins the great plateau has disappeared, having been replaced by a part of the forest-covered, half submerged alluvial plain, which extends far to the north-east and west. The Pará River, generally called one of the mouths of the Amazon, is only the lower reach of the Tocantins. If any portion of the waters of the Amazon runs round the southern side of the large island of Marajó into the river Para, it is only through tortuous, natural canals, which are in no sense outflow channels of the Amazon.

== Discharge ==
The Tocantins River records a mean discharge rate of 13,598 m^{3}/s (480,200 cu ft/s) and a specific discharge rate of 14.4 L/s/km^{2} (1.32 cu ft/s/sq mi). The sub-basins have the following specific discharge rates: Tocantins (11 L/s/km^{2} or 1.0 cu ft/s/sq mi), Araguaia (16 L/s/km^{2} or 1.5 cu ft/s/sq mi), Pará (17 L/s/km^{2} or 1.6 cu ft/s/sq mi) and Guamá (21 L/s/km^{2} or 1.9 cu ft/s/sq mi).

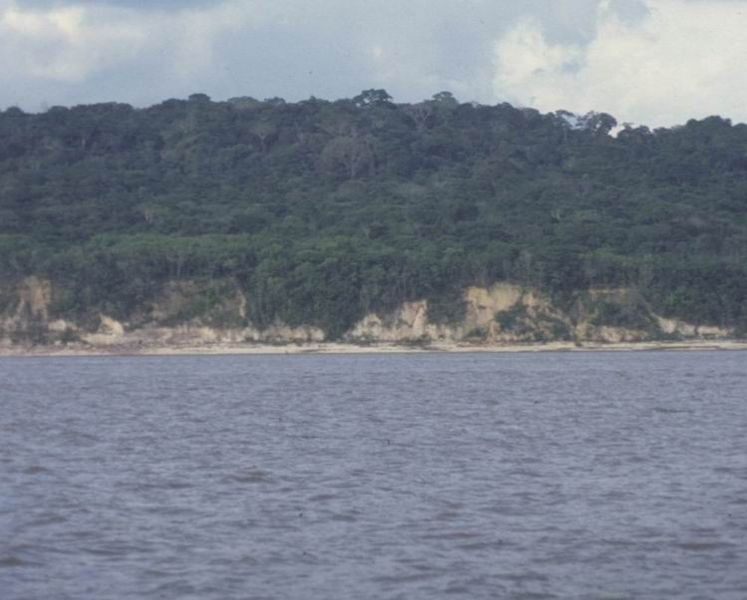
The banks of the Tocantins are rocky in some places
