= Araguaia River =

Araguaia River ♂ Berohokỹ [beɾohoˈkə̃], ♀ Bèrakuhukỹ [bɛɾakuhuˈkə̃] (Karajá)
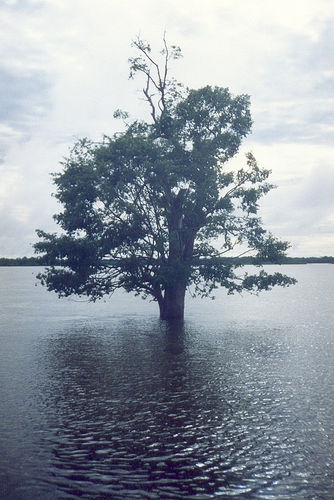
- A tree in the Araguaia National Park in flood season

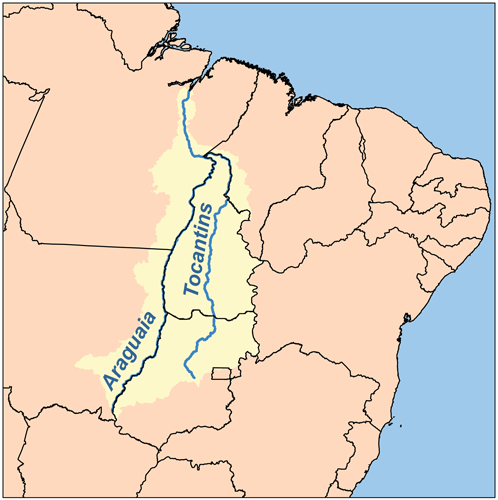
- Map of the Araguaia/Tocantins Watershed
- Native name: Rio Araguaia (Portuguese)

Location
- Country: Brazil
- State: Goiás, Mato Grosso, Tocantins, Pará

Physical characteristics
- Source: Araguaia River
  - location: Mineiros, Goiás
  - coordinates: 18°02′02″S 53°03′47″W
  - elevation: 858 m (2,815 ft)
- Mouth: Tocantins River
  - location: São João do Araguaia, Pará
  - coordinates: 5°22′34″S 48°43′08″W
  - elevation: 90 m (300 ft)
- Length: 2,627 km (1,632 mi)
- Basin size: 377,000 km^{2} (146,000 mi^{2}) 358,125 km^{2} (138,273 mi^{2})
- Discharge
  - location: Conceição do Araguaia, Brazil (Basin size: 358,125 km^{2} (138,273 sq mi))
  - average: 6,172 m^{3}/s (218,000 cu ft/s) 6,216 m^{3}/s (219,500 cu ft/s)
- Discharge
  - location: Confluence of Tocantins
  - average: 6,420 m^{3}/s (227,000 cu ft/s) 6,500 m^{3}/s (230,000 cu ft/s)

Basin features
- River system: Tocantins basin

The Araguaia River (Portuguese: Rio Araguaia [ˈʁi.u aɾaˈɡwajjɐ], Karajá: ♂ Berohokỹ [beɾohoˈkə̃], ♀ Bèrakuhukỹ [bɛɾakuhuˈkə̃]) is one of the major rivers of Brazil, and a tributary of the Tocantins River.

== Geography ==
The Araguaia River comes from Goiás-Mato Grosso south borders. From there it flows northeast to a junction with the Tocantins near the town of São João.

Along its course, the river forms the border between the states of Goiás, Mato Grosso, Tocantins and Pará. Roughly in the middle of its course the Araguaia splits into a fork (with the western stream retaining the name Araguaia and the eastern one being called the Javaés River). These later reunite, forming the Ilha do Bananal, the world's largest river island. The vein of the Javaés forms a broad inland delta where it pours back into the main Araguaia, a 100,000 hectare expanse of igapós or flooded forest, blackwater river channels, and oxbow lakes called Cantão, protected by the Cantão State Park. It is one of the biologically richest areas of the eastern Amazon, with over 700 species of birds, nearly 300 species of fish, large populations of species such as the giant otter, the black caiman, the pirarucú, one of the world's largest freshwater fish, and the Araguaian river dolphin (or Araguaian boto), all occurring within a large area.

A large portion of the Araguaia's course is navigable all year, but the river below the Cantão wetlands is interrupted by rapids.

The middle and lower basin of the river is in the Xingu–Tocantins–Araguaia moist forests ecoregion. The combined watershed of Araguaia and Tocantins rivers (named the Araguaia Tocantins Basin) covers approximately 9.5% of Brazil's national territory. This area is an integral part of the Amazon biome; however, the Araguaia River is not a tributary of the Amazon.

"Araguaia" means "River of the macaws" in the native Tupi language.

=== Tributaries ===
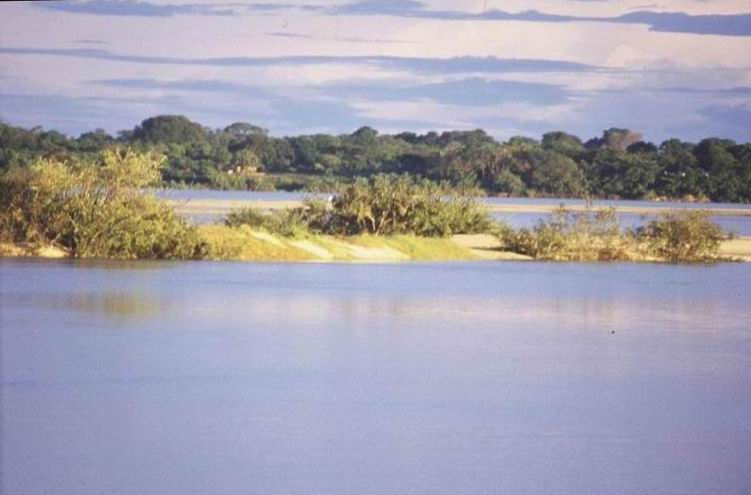
The Araguaia River

Its principal tributary is the Rio das Mortes, which rises in the Serra de São Jerônimo, near Cuiabá, Mato Grosso, and is navigable to Pará. Other important tributaries include the Bonito, Garcas, Tapirape and the Formoso or Cristalino on the west, and the Pitombas, Claro, Vermelho, Tucupa and Chavante on the east.

== History ==
The Araguaia River basin has been inhabited for thousands of years by various indigenous ethnic groups, including the Karajá, Javaé, and Xavánte, who continue to reside along its banks, particularly around the Ilha do Bananal—the world's largest river island formed by the Araguaia splitting into two channels.

European contact in the region began in the 17th century. The discovery of gold in the river's tributaries by explorer Bartolomeu Bueno da Silva in 1682 spurred initial colonial penetration and led to the establishment of settlements like Santa Anna (now the city of Goiás).

The 18th and 19th centuries saw limited success in colonizing the river valley, but the area was heavily exploited by slave-hunting expeditions from São Paulo and Belém, displacing and reducing the indigenous population. It was explored in part by Henri Coudreau in 1897. The Karajá do Norte, for instance, were subjected to a "very violent process of population loss," declining to just 3–4% of their former size by the mid-20th century due to conflicts and displacement from colonization.

=== 20th Century and Modern Significance ===
True habitation of the Araguaia valley accelerated in the 1960s due to new communication links and the expansion of cattle ranching and agriculture. This period of rapid development led to significant deforestation and land-use change, causing increased erosion and sedimentation in the river's channel.

Between 1972 and 1974, the Araguaia region was the stage for a critical event in modern Brazilian history: the Araguaia Guerrilla War, a conflict between left-wing resistance movements and the military dictatorship. The river's remote terrain became a battleground, highlighting its role as a frontier and strategic area.

Today, the Araguaia River remains vital as a transitional zone between the Cerrado savanna and the Amazon rainforest, crucial for biodiversity and tourism. However, it faces severe threats from continued agricultural expansion, dam construction, and proposals for an industrial waterway (hidrovia), which threaten its ecology and the livelihoods of its riverside and indigenous communities.

== Towns ==
Among the most important settlements on the banks of the Araguaia River are (in a downstream order):

- Barra do Garças
- Aragarças
- Aruanã
- Luiz Alves
- São Félix do Araguaia
- Santa Terezinha
- Araguacema
- Conceição do Araguaia
- Xambioá
- São Geraldo do Araguaia
- São João do Araguaia

== Tourism ==
Tourism along the Araguaia River is heavily centered on ecotourism and sport fishing, capitalizing on the region's unique biodiversity as a transition zone between the Amazon rainforest and the Cerrado savanna. The river attracts visitors drawn to its abundant wildlife, including river dolphins, jaguars, and a vast array of bird species.

A significant portion of tourism activity focuses on the preservation of these natural habitats. As noted by travel experts, "Several parts of the river's course are protected by national parks and other reserves like the Emas National Park and the Araguaia National Park".. Emas National Park, located near the river's headwaters, is a UNESCO World Heritage site recognized for its biodiversity, while Araguaia National Park protects a large section of Ilha do Bananal, the world's largest fluvial island.

The river's seasonal hydrology creates a major tourist attraction during the dry season. The Araguaia has "beaches" - bright sandy banks that seam the stream from May to October. These ephemeral white sand beaches, particularly near towns like Aruanã, become hubs for camping, swimming, and festivals, drawing thousands of visitors annually. Several parts of the river's course are protected by national parks and other reserves like the Emas National Park and the Araguaia National Park. The Araguaia has "beaches" - bright sandy banks that seam the stream from May to October.

== Deforestation and Impacts on the Araguaia ==
Deforestation and expansion of cattle ranching and agriculture in the Araguaia basin has been extreme during the last four decades. As a consequence, strong linear erosion has produced thousand of gullies just in the upper Araguaia basin, and the river mainstem suffered strong sedimentation and fluvial metamorphism (changes in its channel pattern).

== See also ==
- List of rivers of Goiás
- South Amazon Ecotones Ecological Corridor
- Deforestation
