= Dos Indios River =

Dos Indios River or Rio dos Indios may refer to:

== Rivers in Brazil ==
- Dos Indios River (lower Ivaí River tributary), Paraná
- Dos Indios River (upper Ivaí River tributary), Paraná
- Dos Indios River (Canoas River tributary), Santa Catarina
- Dos Indios River (Itajaí River tributary), Santa Catarina

== Other uses ==
- Rio dos Índios, a municipality in Rio Grande do Sul, Brazil
