= São Jerônimo (disambiguation) =

São Jerônimo is a municipality in the state of Rio Grande do Sul, Brazil.

São Jerônimo may also refer to:

- São Jerônimo da Serra, a municipality in Paraná, Brazil
- São Jerônimo River (Pinhão River tributary), a river in Paraná, Brazil
- São Jerônimo River (Tibagi River tributary), a river in Paraná, Brazil

== See also ==
- Saint Jerome (disambiguation)
- San Jerónimo (disambiguation)
