= Capanema =

Capanema may refer to:

- Capanema, Pará, Northern region of Brazil
- Capanema, Paraná, South Region of Brazil
- Capanema River
