= Marrecas River =

There are three rivers named Marrecas River, all in Paraná, Brazil:

- Marrecas River (Belo River)
- Marrecas River (Santana River)
- Das Marrecas River
