= Das Antas River =

There are several rivers named Das Antas River or Rio das Antas in Brazil:

- Das Antas River (Bom River tributary)
- Das Antas River (Goiás)
- Das Antas River (Rio Grande do Sul)
- Das Antas River (Santa Catarina)
- Das Antas River (Tibagi River tributary)
