= Dos Patos River =

There are several rivers named Dos Patos River, Rio dos Patos or Rio de los Patos.

== Brazil ==
- Dos Patos River (Goiás)
- Dos Patos River (Iratim River)
- Dos Patos River (Ivaí River)
- Dos Patos River (Mato Grosso)

== Argentina ==
- Río de los Patos
