= Lonqueador River =

River in Brazil

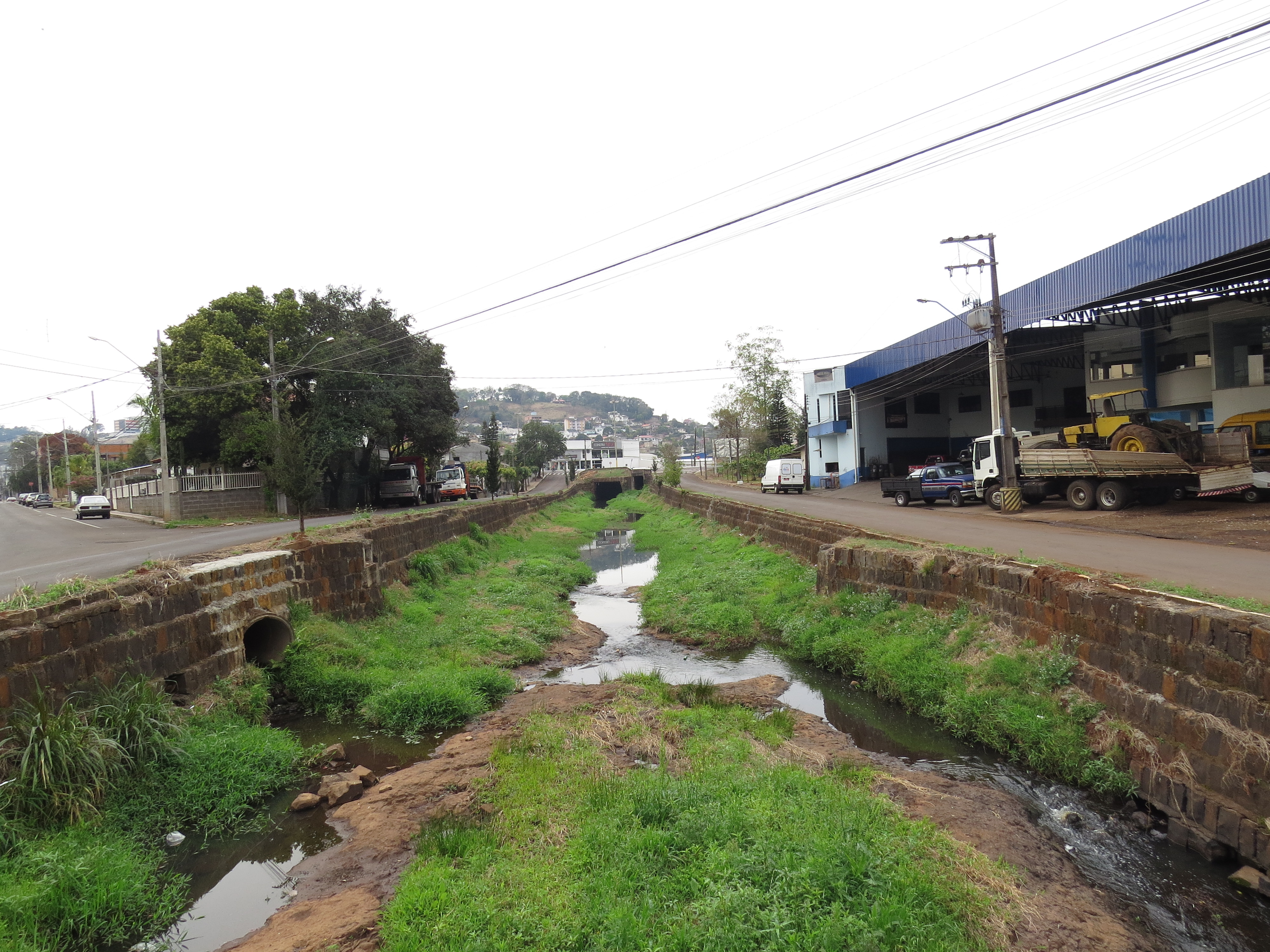

Location
- Country: Brazil

Physical characteristics
- Source
  - location: Paraná state
- Mouth: Marrecas River
  - coordinates: 26°4′S 53°3′W

The Lonqueador River is a river of Paraná state in southern Brazil.

== See also ==
- List of rivers of Paraná
