= Santa Quitéria River =

River in Brazil

Location
- Country: Brazil

Physical characteristics
- Source
  - location: Paraná
- Mouth: São Francisco Falso Braço Norte River
  - coordinates: 24°48′S 54°0′W

The Santa Quitéria River is a river of Paraná state in southern Brazil.

Average annual rainfall is 2,426 millimeters. The wettest month is June, with an average of 373 mm of precipitation, and the driest is August, with 36 mm of precipitation.

== See also ==
- List of rivers of Paraná
