= Tapera River (Paraná) =

River in Brazil

Location
- Country: Brazil

Physical characteristics
- Source
  - location: Paraná state
- Mouth: Cavernoso River
  - coordinates: 25°35′S 52°16′W

The Tapera River is a river of Paraná state in southern Brazil. It joins the Cavernoso River shortly before that in turn flows into the Iguazu River.

== See also ==
- List of rivers of Paraná
