= Do Quati River =

River in Brazil

Location
- Country: Brazil

Physical characteristics
- Source
  - location: Paraná state
- Mouth: Corvo River
  - coordinates: 22°41′S 52°49′W

The Do Quati River is a river of Paraná state in southern Brazil. It is a tributary of the Corvo River just before that in turn flows into the Paranapanema.

== See also ==
- List of rivers of Paraná
