= Claro River (Apucaraninha River tributary) =

River in Brazil

Location
- Country: Brazil

Physical characteristics
- Source
  - location: Paraná state
- Mouth: Apucaraninha River
  - coordinates: 23°44′S 51°3′W

The Claro River is a river of Paraná state in southern Brazil. It is a tributary of the Apucaraninha River.

== See also ==
- List of rivers of Paraná
