= Sant'Ana River (Da Areia River tributary) =

River in Brazil

Location
- Country: Brazil

Physical characteristics
- Source
  - location: Paraná state
- Mouth: Da Areia River
  - coordinates: 25°56′S 51°23′W

The Sant'Ana River is a river of Paraná state in southern Brazil. It is a tributary of the Da Areia River.

== See also ==
- List of rivers of Paraná
