= Tacaniça River =

River in Brazil

Location
- Country: Brazil

Physical characteristics
- Source
  - location: Paraná state
- Mouth: Açunguí River
  - coordinates: 25°11′S 49°33′W

The Tacaniça River is a river of Paraná state in southern Brazil.

== See also ==
- List of rivers of Paraná
