= Três Barras River (Paraná) =

Location
- Country: Brazil

Physical characteristics
- Source
  - location: Paraná state
- Mouth: Das Antas River
  - coordinates: 23°53′S 51°27′W

The Três Barras River is a river of Paraná state in southeastern Brazil. It is a tributary of the Das Antas River.

== See also ==
- List of rivers of Paraná
