= Bandeirantes do Norte River =

River in Brazil

Location
- Country: Brazil

Physical characteristics
- Source
  - location: Paraná state
- Mouth: Pirapó River
  - coordinates: 22°55′S 52°4′W

The Bandeirantes do Norte River is a river of Paraná state in southern Brazil.

== See also ==
- List of rivers of Paraná
