= Belo River =

Belo River may refer to:

== Brazil ==
- Belo River (Iguazu River tributary), Paraná, Brazil
- Belo River (Ivaí River tributary), Paraná, Brazil
