= Do Meio River (Paraná) =

River in Brazil

Location
- Country: Brazil

Physical characteristics
- Source
  - location: Paraná state
- Mouth: Jacaré River
  - coordinates: 23°18′S 49°56′W

The Do Meio River is a river of Paraná state in southern Brazil.

== See also ==
- List of rivers of Paraná
