= Forquilha River =

River in Brazil

Location
- Country: Brazil

Physical characteristics
- Source
  - location: Paraná state
- Mouth: Vitorino River
  - coordinates: 26°8′S 52°49′W

The Forquilha River is a river of Paraná state in southern Brazil.

== See also ==
- List of rivers of Paraná
