= Cachoeira River (Potinga River tributary) =

River in Brazil

Location
- Country: Brazil

Physical characteristics
- Source
  - location: Paraná state
- Mouth: Potinga River
  - coordinates: 25°40′S 50°43′W

The Cachoeira River is a river of Paraná state in southern Brazil. It is a tributary of the Potinga River.

== See also ==
- List of rivers of Paraná
