= Cambé River =

River in Brazil

Location
- Country: Brazil

Physical characteristics
- Source
  - location: Paraná state
- Mouth: Três Bôcas River
  - coordinates: 23°22′S 51°3′W

The Cambé River, commonly called the Cambezinho, is a river of Paraná state in southern Brazil, flowing through Cambé municipality. It is a tributary of the Três Bôcas River.

== See also ==
- List of rivers of Paraná
