= Perdido River (Paraná) =

River in Brazil

Location
- Country: Brazil

Physical characteristics
- Source
  - location: Paraná state
- Mouth: Ribeira River
  - coordinates: 25°16′S 50°38′W

The Perdido River is a river of Paraná state in southern Brazil. It is a tributary of the Ribeira River.

== See also ==
- List of rivers of Paraná
