= São João River (Pitangui River tributary) =

River in Brazil

Location
- Country: Brazil

Physical characteristics
- Source
  - location: Paraná state
- Mouth: Pitangui River
  - coordinates: 24°54′S 50°13′W

The São João River is a tributary of the Pitangui River in Paraná state, southern Brazil.

== See also ==
- List of rivers of Paraná
