= Ipiranga River (Paraná) =

River in Brazil

Location
- Country: Brazil

Physical characteristics
- Source
  - location: Paraná state
- Mouth: Bitumirim River
  - coordinates: 25°0′S 50°35′W

The Ipiranga River is a river of Paraná state in southern Brazil. Arising in Imbituva municipality, it flows northwards to join the Bitumirim River.

== See also ==
- List of rivers of Paraná
