= Barra Nova River =

River in Brazil

Location
- Country: Brazil

Physical characteristics
- Source
  - location: Paraná state
- Mouth: Bom River
  - coordinates: 23°42′S 51°26′W

The Barra Nova River is a river of Paraná state in southern Brazil.

== See also ==
- List of rivers of Paraná
