= Capricornio =

Capricornio may refer to:

- Capricornio (album), an album by María Isabel
- Capricornio (rocket), a Spanish satellite launch vehicle
- Capricórnio River, a river of Paraná state in southern Brazil
