= Fartura (disambiguation) =

Fartura is a doughnut that is fried in oil in the form of a roll.

Fartura may also refer to:

- Fartura do Piauí, a municipality in the state of Piauí in the Northeast region of Brazil.
- Fartura (municipality), a municipality in the state of São Paulo in Brazil.
- Da Fartura River, a river of Paraná state in southern Brazil.
