= São Pedro River (Alonzo River tributary) =

River in Brazil

Location
- Country: Brazil

Physical characteristics
- Source
  - location: Paraná state
- Mouth: Alonzo River
  - coordinates: 24°7′S 51°27′W

The São Pedro River is a river of Paraná state in southern Brazil. It is a tributary of the Alonzo River.

== See also ==
- List of rivers of Paraná
