= Aquidabã River (Paraná) =

River in Brazil

Location
- Country: Brazil

Physical characteristics
- Source
  - location: Paraná state
- Mouth: Pinguim River
  - coordinates: 23°36′S 51°59′W

The Aquidabã River is a river of Paraná state in southern Brazil. It is a tributary of the Pinguim River, which flows into the Ivaí River.

== See also ==
- List of rivers of Paraná
