= Real River =

Real River or Rio Real may refer to:

- Real River (Brazil)
- Real River (Portugal), a river of Portugal
- Rio Real, a municipality in Bahia, Brazil

== See also ==
- Campo Real River, Paraná, Brazil
- Rea River, Fiordland, New Zealand
