= Jutuva River =

River in Brazil

Location
- Country: Brazil

Physical characteristics
- Source
  - location: Paraná state
- Mouth: Pitangui River
  - coordinates: 25°0′S 50°0′W

The Jutuva or Jotuba River is a river of Paraná state in southern Brazil. It is a tributary of the Pitangui River in the Represa dos Alagados.

== See also ==
- List of rivers of Paraná
