= Guarauninha River =

River in Brazil

Location
- Country: Brazil

Physical characteristics
- Source
  - location: Paraná state
- Mouth: Guaraúna River
  - coordinates: 25°17′S 50°17′W

The Guarauninha River is a river of Paraná state in southern Brazil. It is a tributary of the Guaraúna River.

== See also ==
- List of rivers of Paraná
