= Da Areia River (Goio-Ere River tributary) =

River in Brazil

Location
- Country: Brazil

Physical characteristics
- Source
  - location: Paraná state
- Mouth: Goio-Ere River
  - coordinates: 23°54′S 53°8′W

The Da Areia River is a river of Paraná state in southern Brazil. It is a tributary of the Goio-Ere River.

== See also ==
- List of rivers of Paraná
