= Bugre River =

River in Brazil

Location
- Country: Brazil

Physical characteristics
- Source
  - location: Paraná state
- Mouth: Araras River
  - coordinates: 23°55′S 52°3′W

The Bugre River is a river of Paraná state in southern Brazil.

== See also ==
- List of rivers of Paraná
