= Poço Bonito River =

River in Brazil

Location
- Country: Brazil

Physical characteristics
- Source
  - location: Paraná state
- Mouth: Potinga River
  - coordinates: 25°41′S 50°40′W

The Poço Bonito River is a river located in the Paraná state in southern Brazil.

== See also ==
- List of rivers of Paraná
