= Vermelho River (Paranapanema River tributary) =

River in Brazil

Location
- Country: Brazil

Physical characteristics
- Source
  - location: Paraná state
- Mouth: Paranapanema River
  - coordinates: 22°39′S 51°23′W

The Vermelho River is a river of Paraná state in southern Brazil. It is a tributary of the Paranapanema River.

== See also ==
- List of rivers of Paraná
