= São João River (Dos Patos River tributary) =

River in Brazil

Location
- Country: Brazil

Physical characteristics
- Source
  - location: Paraná state
- Mouth: Dos Patos River
  - coordinates: 25°1′S 50°58′W

The São João River is a tributary of the Dos Patos River in Paraná state, southern Brazil.

== See also ==
- List of rivers of Paraná
