= Fortaleza River =

River in Brazil

Location
- Country: Brazil

Physical characteristics
- Source
  - location: Paraná state
- Mouth: Iapó River
  - coordinates: 24°29′S 50°22′W

The Fortaleza River is a river of Paraná state in southern Brazil.

== See also ==
- List of rivers of Paraná
