= Branco River (Paraná) =

River of Paraná, Brazil

Location
- Country: Brazil

Physical characteristics
- Source
  - location: Paraná state
- Mouth: Ivaí River
  - coordinates: 24°12′S 51°31′W

The Branco River is a river of Paraná state in southern Brazil.The Branco follows a south-southwesterly course for 482 mi (775 km) before it joins the Negro River, a major tributary of the Amazon, via numerous channels.

== See also ==
- List of rivers of Paraná
