= Caiuá River =

River in Brazil

Location
- Country: Brazil

Physical characteristics
- Source
  - location: Paraná state
- Mouth: Paranapanema River
  - coordinates: 22°37′S 52°24′W

The Caiuá River is a river of Paraná state in southern Brazil.

== See also ==
- List of rivers of Paraná
