= Capricórnio River =

River in Brazil

Location
- Country: Brazil

Physical characteristics
- Source
  - location: Paraná state
- Mouth: Tapiracuí River
  - coordinates: 23°29′S 53°1′W

The Capricórnio River is a river of Paraná state in southern Brazil.

== See also ==
- List of rivers of Paraná
