= Guaraqueçaba River =

River in Brazil

Location
- Country: Brazil

Physical characteristics
- Source
  - location: Paraná state
- Mouth: Atlantic Ocean
  - coordinates: 25°15′S 48°20′W

The Guaraqueçaba River is a river of Paraná state in southern Brazil. It discharges into the Baía das Laranjeiras within the municipality of the same name.

== See also ==
- List of rivers of Paraná
