= Butiá River =

River in Brazil

Location
- Country: Brazil

Physical characteristics
- Source
  - location: Paraná state
- Mouth: Iguazu River
  - coordinates: 25°56′S 52°5′W

The Butiá River is a river in the state of Paraná in southern Brazil.

== See also ==
- List of rivers of Paraná
