= Maurício River =

River in Brazil

Location
- Country: Brazil

Physical characteristics
- Source
  - location: Paraná state
- Mouth: Iguazu River
  - coordinates: 25°39′S 49°22′W

The Maurício River is a river of Paraná state in southern Brazil.

== See also ==
- List of rivers of Paraná
