= São Jerônimo River (Pinhão River tributary) =

River in Brazil

Location
- Country: Brazil

Physical characteristics
- Source
  - location: Paraná state
- Mouth: Pinhão River
  - coordinates: 25°37′S 51°29′W

The São Jerônimo River is a river of Paraná state in southern Brazil. It is a tributary of the Pinhão River.

== See also ==
- List of rivers of Paraná
