= Barra Grande River (Tibagi River tributary) =

River in Paraná, Brazil

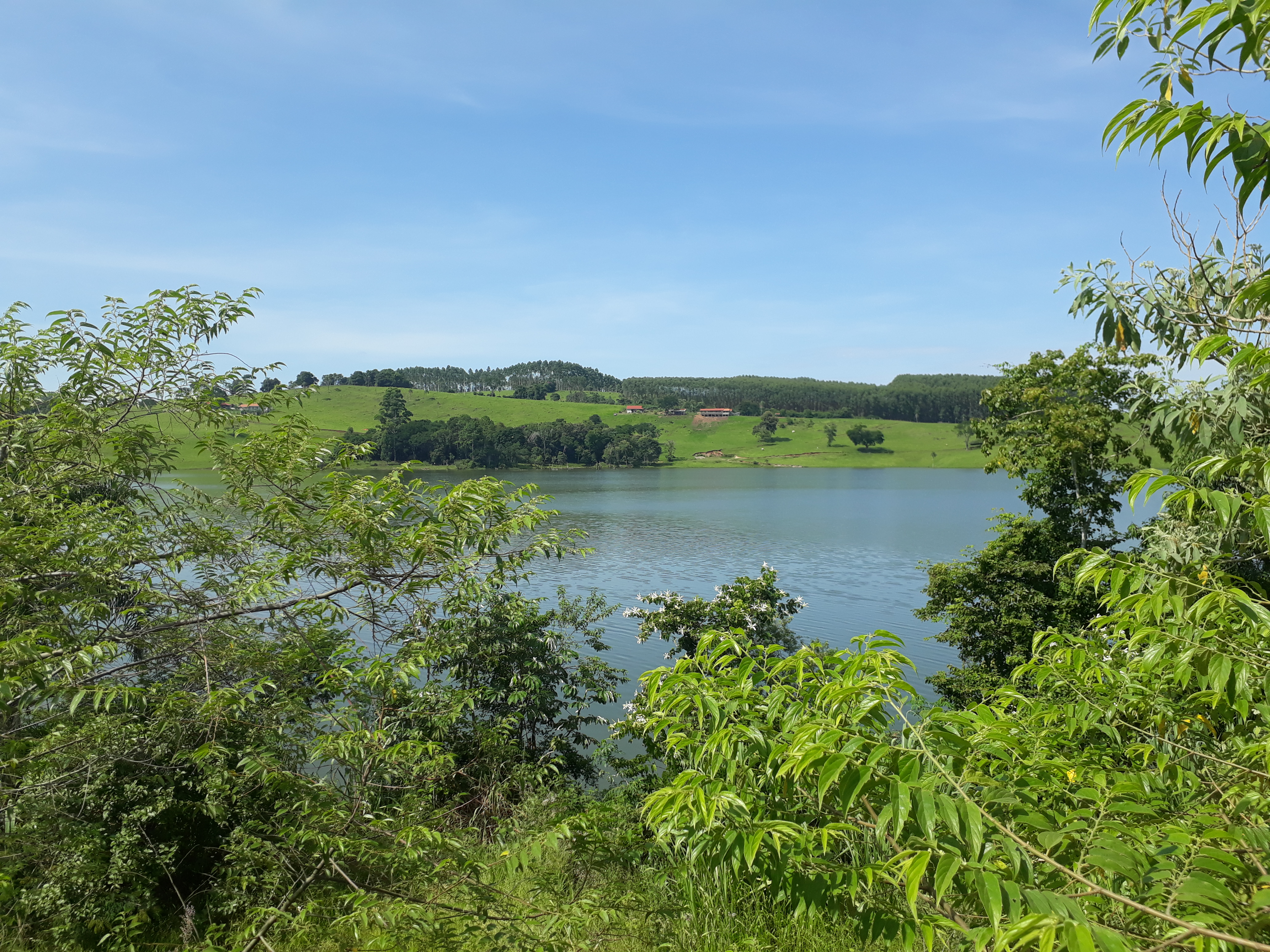

Location
- Country: Brazil

Physical characteristics
- Source
  - location: Paraná state
- Mouth: Tibagi River
  - coordinates: 24°9′S 50°52′W

The Barra Grande River is a river of Paraná state in southern Brazil. It is a tributary of the Tibagi River.

== See also ==
- List of rivers of Paraná
