= List of rivers in Paraná =

List of rivers in Paraná (Brazilian State).

The list is arranged by drainage basin from north to south, with respective tributaries indented under each larger stream's name and ordered from downstream to upstream. All rivers in Paraná drain to the Atlantic Ocean, primarily via the Paraná River.

== By Drainage Basin ==
=== Atlantic Coast ===
- Ribeira de Iguape River
  - Pardo River
    - São João Surrá River
    - Uberaba River
      - Puturã River
    - Capivari River
  - São Sebastião River
  - Grande River
  - Do Rocha River
  - Itapirapuã River
  - Turvo River
  - Ponta Grossa River
  - Piedade River
    - Sant'Ana River
  - Açunguí River
    - Tacaniça River
- Guaraqueçaba River
- Serra Negra River
- Cachoeira River
- Cubatão River
  - São João River
  - Cubatãozinho River

=== Paraná Basin ===
- Paraná River
  - Iguazu River
    - São João River
    - Belo River
      - Represa Grande River
    - Santo Antônio River
    - Benjamim Constant River
    - Floriano River
    - Siemens River
    - Gonçalves Dias River
    - Capanema River
    - Andrade River
    - Cotegipe River
    - Tormenta River
    - Adelaide River
    - Jaracatiá River
    - Canoas River
    - Guarani River
    - Chopim River
      - Santana River
        - Marrecas River
          - Lonqueador River
      - Vitorino River
        - Forquilha River
      - Jacutinga River
      - Pato Branco River
      - Do Banho River
      - Das Lontras River
      - Bandeira River
    - Das Cobras River
    - Capivara River
    - Cavernoso River
      - Tapera River
      - Araras River
    - Jordão River
      - Capão Grande River
      - Caracu River
      - Pinhão River
        - São Jerônimo River
      - Campo Real River
      - Coitinho River
    - Das Marrecas River
    - Butiá River
    - Iratim River
      - Dos Patos River
      - São Lourenço River
    - Da Areia River
      - Pimpão River
    - Palmetto Devria River
      - Sant'Ana River
    - Jararaca River
    - Iratinzinho River
    - Palmital River
    - Jangada River
      - Faria River
    - Vermelho River
    - Da Várzea River
    - Claro River
    - Potinga River
      - Poço Bonito River
      - Cachoeira River
      - Preto River
    - Negro River
      - Da Várzea River
      - Passa Três River
    - Água Branca River
    - Água Amarela River
    - Passa Dois River
    - Dos Papagaios River
    - Passa Una River
    - Maurício River
    - Miringuava River
    - Belém River
    - Piraquara River
  - Ocoi River
  - São Francisco Falso Braço Sul River
  - São Francisco Falso Braço Norte River
    - Santa Quitéria River
  - São Francisco River
  - Arroio Guaçu River
  - Tatuí River
  - Piquiri River
    - Iporã River
    - Xambre River
    - Açu River
    - Jangada River
    - Azul River
    - Jacaré River
    - Encantado River
    - Verde River
    - Dos Jesuítas River
    - Goioerê River
      - Da Areia River
    - Barreiro River
    - Carajá River
    - Melissa River
    - Sapucaí River (Reboucas River)
    - Goio-Bang River
      - Mamboré River
      - Tricolor River
  - Herveira River
    - Tourinho River
    - Cantú River
      - Caratuva River
      - Água Quente River
      - Macacos River
      - Mato Rico River
      - Da Prata River
    - Barbaquá River
    - Feio River
    - Laranjal River
    - Bandeira River
    - Do Cobre River
      - Cinco Voltas River
  - São João River
  - Paracaí River
  - Itaúna River
  - Do Veado River
  - Ivaí River
    - Tapiracuí River
      - Capricórnio River
    - Dos Indios River
    - Ligeiro River
    - Claro River
    - Pinguim River
      - Aquidabã River
    - Mourão River
    - Araras River
      - Bugre River
    - Corumbataí River
      - Chupador River
        - Formoso River
          - Laranjeiras River
      - Muguilhão River
      - Vorá River
    - Bulha River
    - Bom River
      - Das Antas River
        - Três Barras River
      - Barra Nova River
    - Alonzo River
      - São Pedro River
      - Bonito River
      - Da Faca River
    - Branco River
    - Azul River
    - Ubazinho River
    - Borboleta River
    - Pitanga River
    - Bonito River
    - Belo River
      - Marrecas River
      - São Francisco River
    - Ivaizinho River
    - Barra Grande River
    - Dos Indios River
    - Dos Patos River
      - São João River
        - Boa Vista River
      - Lajeado River
  - Paranapanema River
    - Corvo River
      - Do Quati River
    - Caiuá River
    - Pirapó River
      - Bandeirantes do Norte River
    - Vermelho River
    - Tibagi River
      - Congonhas River
      - Três Bôcas River
        - Cambé River
      - Taquara River
      - São Jerônimo River
      - Apucaraninha River
        - Claro River
      - Apucarama River
      - Das Antas River
      - Barra Grande River
      - Alegre River
      - Harmonia River
      - Imbaú River
      - Iapó River
        - Fortaleza River
        - Piraí-Mirim River
        - Piraí River
        - Cunhaporanga River
      - Pitangui River
        - São João River
        - Jutuva River
      - Bitumirim River
        - Ipiranga River
      - Imbituva River
        - Ribeira River
          - Perdido River
      - Guaraúna River
        - Guarauninha River
      - Do Salto River
    - Das Cinzas River
      - Laranjinha River
      - Jacaré River (Jacarezinho River)
        - Do Meio River
    - Itararé River
      - Da Fartura River
      - Da Pescaria River
      - Jaguariaíva River
      - Jaguariatu River
      - Da Água Morta River

== Alphabetically ==
- Açu River
- Açunguí River
- Adelaide River
- Água Amarela River
- Água Branca River
- Da Água Morta River
- Água Quente River
- Alegre River
- Alonzo River
- Andrade River
- Das Antas River
- Das Antas River
- Apucarama River
- Apucaraninha River
- Aquidabã River
- Araras River
- Araras River
- Da Areia River
- Da Areia River
- Arroio Guaçu River
- Azul River
- Azul River
- Bandeira River
- Bandeira River
- Bandeirantes do Norte River
- Do Banho River
- Barbaquá River
- Barra Grande River
- Barra Grande River
- Barra Nova River
- Barreiro River
- Belém River
- Belo River
- Belo River
- Benjamim Constant River
- Bitumirim River
- Boa Vista River
- Bom River
- Bonito River
- Bonito River
- Borboleta River
- Branco River
- Bugre River
- Bulha River
- Butiá River
- Cachoeira River
- Cachoeira River
- Caiuá River
- Cambé River
- Campo Real River
- Canoas River
- Cantú River
- Capanema River
- Capão Grande River
- Capivara River
- Capivari River
- Capricórnio River
- Caracu River
- Carajá River
- Caratuva River
- Cavernoso River
- Chopim River
- Chupador River
- Cinco Voltas River
- Das Cinzas River
- Claro River
- Claro River
- Claro River
- Das Cobras River
- Do Cobre River
- Coitinho River
- Congonhas River
- Corumbataí River
- Corvo River
- Cotegipe River
- Cubatão River
- Cubatãozinho River
- Cunhaporanga River
- Encantado River
- Da Faca River
- Faria River
- Da Fartura River
- Feio River
- Floriano River
- Formoso River
- Forquilha River
- Fortaleza River
- Goio-Bang River
- Goioerê River
- Gonçalves Dias River
- Grande River
- Guarani River
- Guaraqueçaba River
- Guaraúna River
- Guarauninha River
- Iapó River
- Iguazu River
- Imbaú River
- Imbituva River
- Dos Indios River
- Dos Indios River
- Ipiranga River
- Iporã River
- Iratim River
- Iratinzinho River
- Itapirapuã River
- Itararé River
- Itaúna River
- Ivaí River
- Ivaizinho River
- Jacaré River
- Jacaré River (Jacarezinho River)
- Jacutinga River
- Jaguariaíva River
- Jaguariatu River
- Jangada River
- Jangada River
- Jaracatiá River
- Jararaca River
- Dos Jesuítas River
- Jordão River
- Jutuva River
- Lajeado River
- Laranjal River
- Laranjeiras River
- Laranjinha River
- Ligeiro River
- Lonqueador River
- Das Lontras River
- Macacos River
- Mamboré River
- Marrecas River
- Marrecas River
- Das Marrecas River
- Mato Rico River
- Maurício River
- Do Meio River
- Melissa River
- Miringuava River
- Mourão River
- Muguilhão River
- Negro River
- Ocoi River
- Palmital River
- Dos Papagaios River
- Paracaí River
- Paraná River
- Paranapanema River
- Pardo River
- Passa Dois River
- Passa Três River
- Passa Una River
- Pato Branco River
- Dos Patos River
- Dos Patos River
- Perdido River
- Da Pescaria River
- Piedade River
- Pimpão River
- Pinguim River
- Pinhão River
- Piquiri River
- Piraí River
- Piraí-Mirim River
- Pirapó River
- Piraquara River
- Pitanga River
- Pitangui River
- Poço Bonito River
- Ponta Grossa River
- Potinga River
- Da Prata River
- Preto River
- Puturã River
- Do Quati River
- Represa Grande River
- Ribeira River
- Ribeira River
- Do Rocha River
- Do Salto River
- Santana River
- Sant'Ana River
- Sant'Ana River
- Santa Quitéria River
- Santo Antônio River
- São Francisco River
- São Francisco River
- São Francisco Falso Braço Norte River
- São Francisco Falso Braço Sul River
- São Jerônimo River
- São Jerônimo River
- São João River
- São João River
- São João River
- São João River
- São João River
- São João Surrá River
- São Lourenço River
- São Pedro River
- São Sebastião River
- Sapucaí River (Reboucas River)
- Serra Negra River
- Siemens River
- Tacaniça River
- Tapera River
- Tapiracuí River
- Taquara River
- Tatuí River
- Tibagi River
- Tormenta River
- Tourinho River
- Três Barras River
- Três Bôcas River
- Tricolor River
- Turvo River
- Ubazinho River
- Uberaba River
- Da Várzea River
- Da Várzea River
- Do Veado River
- Verde River
- Vermelho River
- Vermelho River
- Vitorino River
- Vorá River
- Xambrê River
