= Ocoi River =

River in Brazil

Coordinates: 25°12′S 54°28′W

Location
- Country: Brazil

Physical characteristics
- Source
  - location: Paraná state

The Ocoi River is a river of Paraná state in southern Brazil. It is a tributary to the River Paraná.

== See also ==
- List of rivers of Paraná
