= Chupador River =

Location
- Country: Brazil

Physical characteristics
- Source
  - location: Paraná state
- Mouth: Corumbataí River
  - coordinates: 24°12′S 52°0′W

The Chupador River is a river of Paraná state in southeastern Brazil. It is a tributary of the Corumbataí River at the junction of Iretama, Barbosa Ferraz and São João do Ivaí municipalities.

== See also ==
- List of rivers of Paraná
