= Jararaca River =

River in Brazil

Location
- Country: Brazil

Physical characteristics
- Source
  - location: Paraná state
- Mouth: Iguazu River
  - coordinates: 26°3′S 51°30′W

The Jararaca River is a river of Paraná state in southern Brazil.

== See also ==
- List of rivers of Paraná
