= Passa Três River =

River in Brazil

Location
- Country: Brazil

Physical characteristics
- Source
  - location: Paraná state
- Mouth: Rio Negro
  - coordinates: 26°5′S 49°48′W

The Passa Três River is a river of Paraná state in southern Brazil.

== See also ==
- List of rivers of Paraná
