= Guarani River =

River in Brazil

Location
- Country: Brazil

Physical characteristics
- Source
  - location: Paraná state
- Mouth: Iguazu River
  - coordinates: 25°31′S 53°9′W

The Guarani River is a river of Paraná state in southern Brazil. The Guaraní River is a waterway in South America, primarily flowing through Paraguay and Argentina. It's a tributary of the Paraná River, one of the continent's major rivers. The Guaraní River plays a significant role in the region's ecology and economy, supporting various ecosystems and serving as a transportation route for goods and people. It's named after the indigenous Guaraní people who historically inhabited the area.

== See also ==
- List of rivers of Paraná
