= Capivara River (Paraná) =

River in Paraná, Brazil

Location
- Country: Brazil

Physical characteristics
- Source
  - location: Paraná state
- Mouth: Iguazu River
  - coordinates: 25°40′S 52°42′W

The Capivara River is a river of Paraná state in southern Brazil.

== See also ==
- List of rivers of Paraná
