= São Francisco River (Paraná) =

River in Brazil

Location
- Country: Brazil

Physical characteristics
- Source
  - location: Paraná state
- Mouth: Paraná River
  - coordinates: 24°40′S 54°20′W

The São Francisco River is a river of Paraná state in southern Brazil.

== See also ==
- List of rivers of Paraná
