= Passa Dois River =

River in Brazil

Coordinates: 25°44′24″S 50°08′54″W

Location
- Country: Brazil

Physical characteristics
- Source
  - location: Paraná state

The Passa Dois River is a river of Paraná state in southern Brazil.

== See also ==
- List of rivers of Paraná
