= Arroio Guaçu River =

River in Brazil

Location
- Country: Brazil

Physical characteristics
- Source
  - location: Paraná state
- Mouth: Paraná River
  - coordinates: 24°23′S 54°16′W

The Arroio Guaçu River is a river of Paraná state in southern Brazil.

== See also ==
- List of rivers of Paraná
