= Taquara River (Paraná) =

River in Brazil

Location
- Country: Brazil

Physical characteristics
- Source
  - location: Paraná state
- Mouth: Tibagi River
  - coordinates: 23°31′S 50°58′W

The Taquara River is a river of Paraná state in southern Brazil.

The Taquara River is situated in an agriculturist region, on the northern portion of the Tibagi river basin.

The region is noted as having one of the most "richest and diversified freshwater fish fauna" on the planet, with over 6,000 documented species.

== See also ==
- List of rivers of Paraná
