= Congonhas River =

River in Brazil

Location
- Country: Brazil

Physical characteristics
- Source
  - location: Paraná state
- Mouth: Tibagi River
  - coordinates: 22°59′S 50°57′W

The Congonhas River is a river of Paraná state in southern Brazil.

== See also ==
- List of rivers of Paraná
