= São João River (Paraná River tributary) =

River in Brazil

- Location of the mouth in Brazil

Location
- Country: Brazil

Physical characteristics
- Source
  - location: Paraná state
- Mouth: Paraná River
  - coordinates: 23°48′53″S 54°00′15″W

The São João River is a tributary of the Paraná River in Paraná state, southern Brazil.

== See also ==
- List of rivers of Paraná
