= Rio Verde (Piquiri) =

River in Brazil

Location
- Country: Brazil

Physical characteristics
- Source
  - location: Paraná state
- Mouth: Piquiri River
  - coordinates: 24°13′S 53°28′W

Rio Verde (Portuguese for "green river") is a river of Paraná state in southern Brazil. It is a tributary of the Piquiri River.

== See also ==
- List of rivers of Paraná
