= Cachoeira River (Paraná) =

River in Brazil

Location
- Country: Brazil

Physical characteristics
- Source
  - location: Antonina, Paraná
  - coordinates: 25.1902°S 48.8345°W
  - elevation: 1282
- Mouth: Atlantic Ocean
  - coordinates: 25°24′S 48°43′W

The Cachoeira River is a river of Paraná state in southern Brazil. The Rio Cachoeira is an approximately 54 km northern tributary of the Bay of Antonina in the southeast of Paraná.

== Etymology ==
The Portuguese term Cachoeira translates to Waterfall in English.

== Geography ==
=== Location ===
The Rio Cachoeira's catchment area is located in the Serra do Mar and in the Coastal Plain of Paraná.

=== Course ===
Its source is located in the municipality of Antonina at an elevation of 1,282 m, about 25 km north of the main town. It is situated on the main ridge of the Serra do Mar between Pico Capivari (IV) and Pico Guaricana (1,550 m) on its northern slope. About 6 km away to the south is the Pico Paraná, the highest mountain in Paraná at 1,877 m.

The river initially flows northward. After about one kilometer and a descent of 400 meters, it turns east. It now loses about 600 meters in elevation over approximately seven kilometers, until it turns south towards the coastal plain. It flows into the Bay of Antonina, an offshoot of the Bay of Paranaguá. It is approximately 54 km long.

=== Tributaries ===
from the right, all three rivers originate on the slopes of Pico Paraná:

- Rio Cotia (8 km)
- Rio Saci (6 km)
- Discharge from the Governador Pedro Viriato Parigot de Souza Power Plant
- Rio Mergulhão (13 km)

from the left:

- Rio São Sebastião (9 km)
- Rio Água Branca (6 km)
- Rio Pequeno (with headstream Rio Guarujá: 28 km)

=== Municipalities in the catchment area ===
The Rio Cachoeira flows entirely within the municipality of Antonina.

== Hydroelectric Power Plant ==
Below the confluence of the Rio Saci, already in the coastal plain, the Rio Cachoeira receives the water of the Rio Capivari, which is used for electricity generation at the Usina Hidrelétrica Governador Pedro Viriato Parigot de Souza. For this purpose, the water is dammed at an elevation of 840 m by a 58 m high and 370 m long earth dam. The reservoir is located on the BR-116 about 50 km northeast of Curitiba towards São Paulo. The water is channeled through a 15.4 km long tunnel that was drilled through the rock mass of the Serra do Mar. In the 1.1 km long pressure pipe with a diameter of 3 m, the water is directed at a speed of 426 km/h into the turbines, generating a power output of 260 MW.

The hydroelectric power plant is located near the village of Cachoeira de Cima in the municipality of Antonina. Its discharge doubles the water volume of the Rio Cachoeira. It was originally named Capivari-Cachoeira after the two affected rivers. Upon completion, it was named after Pedro Viriato Parigot de Sousa, who served as the Governor of Paraná between 1971 and 1973 and was also the president of Copel in the 1950s and 1960s.

== See also ==
- List of rivers of Paraná
