= Alegre River (Paraná) =

River in Brazil

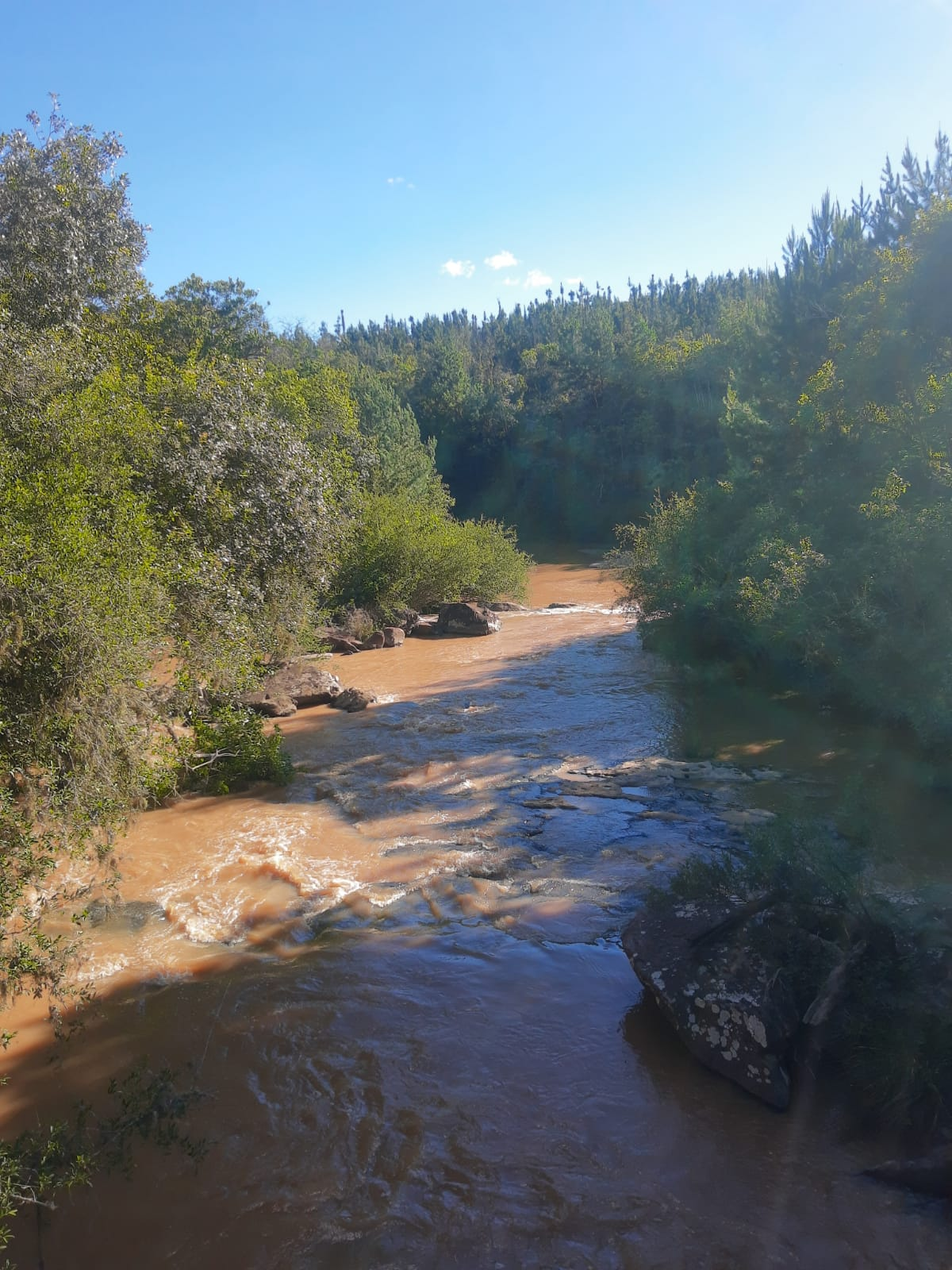

- Location of the mouth in Brazil

Location
- Country: Brazil

Physical characteristics
- Source
  - location: Paraná state
- Mouth: Tibagi River
  - coordinates: 24°28′8″S 50°28′16″W

The Alegre River is a river of Paraná state in southern Brazil.

It is a tributary of the Tibagi River.

== See also ==
- List of rivers of Paraná
