= Ribeira River (Paraná) =

Location
- Country: Brazil

Physical characteristics
- Source
  - location: Paraná state
- Mouth: Imbituva River
  - coordinates: 25°14′35″S 50°34′32″W

The Ribeira River is a river of Paraná state in southeastern Brazil. It is a tributary of the Imbituva River on the edge of the Araucárias Biological Reserve.

== See also ==
- List of rivers of Paraná
