= São Francisco Falso Braço Sul River =

River in Brazil

Coordinates: 24°53′25″S 54°13′22″W

Location
- Country: Brazil

Physical characteristics
- Source
  - location: Paraná state

The São Francisco Falso Braço Sul River is a river of Paraná state in southern Brazil.

== See also ==
- List of rivers of Paraná
