= Água Amarela River =

River in Brazil

- Location of the mouth in Brazil

Location
- Country: Brazil

Physical characteristics
- Source
  - location: Paraná state
- Mouth: Tibagi River
  - coordinates: 25°48′46″S 50°13′42″W

The Água Amarela River is a river of Paraná state in southern Brazil.

== See also ==
- List of rivers of Paraná
