= Imbaú River =

River in Brazil

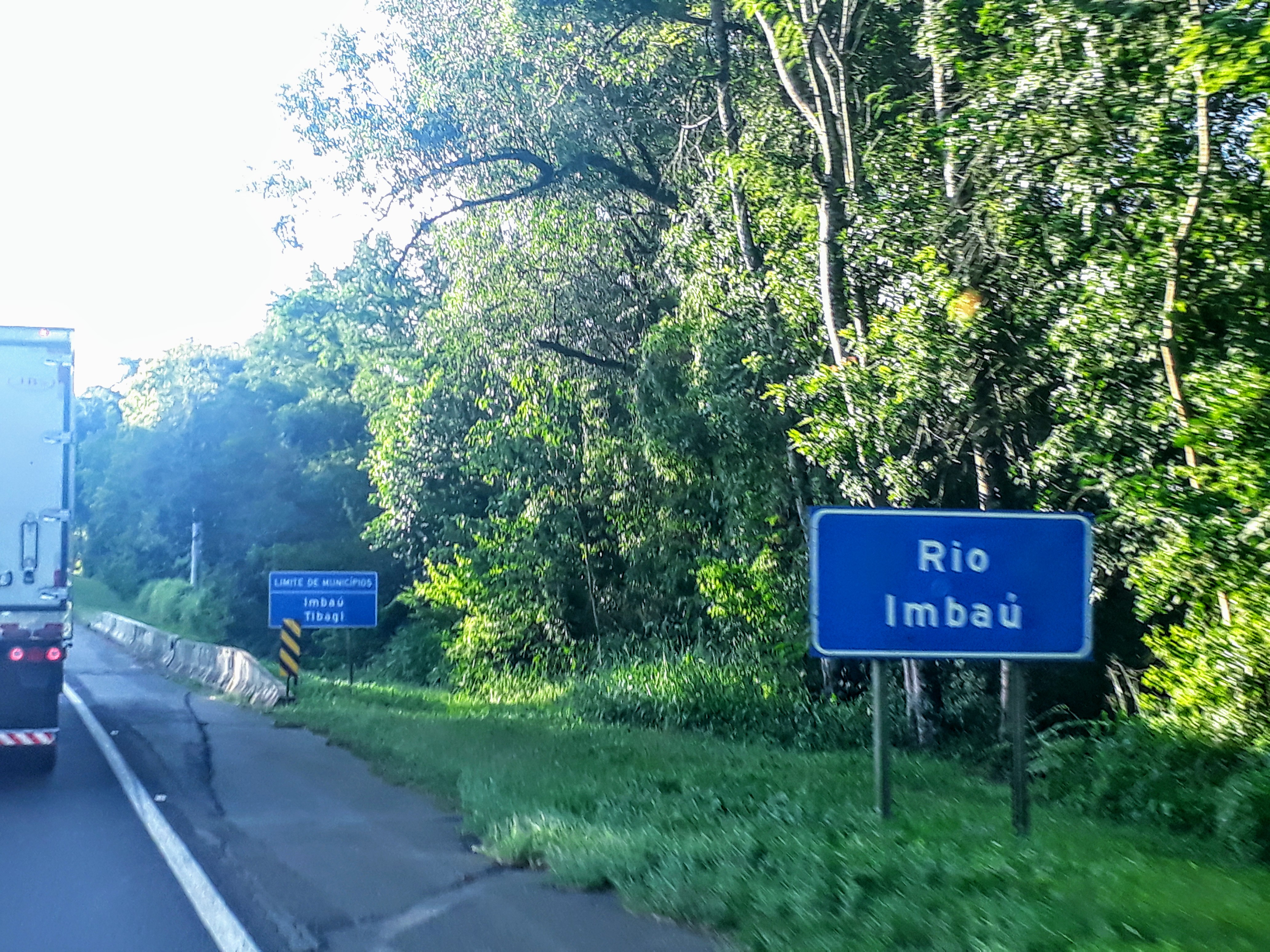
- bridge over the river (highway BR-376).

Location
- Country: Brazil

Physical characteristics
- Source
  - location: Paraná state
- Mouth: Tibagi River
  - coordinates: 24°24′29″S 50°35′38″W
- Length: 112 kilometers

The Imbaú River is a river of Paraná state in southern Brazil. It flows through Paraná over a distance of about 112 kilometers.

== See also ==
- List of rivers of Paraná
