= Jaracatiá River =

River in Brazil

Location
- Country: Brazil

Physical characteristics
- Source
  - location: Paraná state
- Mouth: Iguazu River
  - coordinates: 25°35′S 53°16′W

The Jaracatiá River is a river of Paraná state in southern Brazil.

== See also ==
- List of rivers of Paraná
