= Tricolor River =

River in Brazil

Coordinates: 24°40′08″S 52°58′42″W

Location
- Country: Brazil

Physical characteristics
- Source
  - location: Paraná state

The Tricolor River is a river of Paraná state in southern Brazil.

== See also ==
- List of rivers of Paraná
