= Piraí River (Paraná) =

River in Brazil

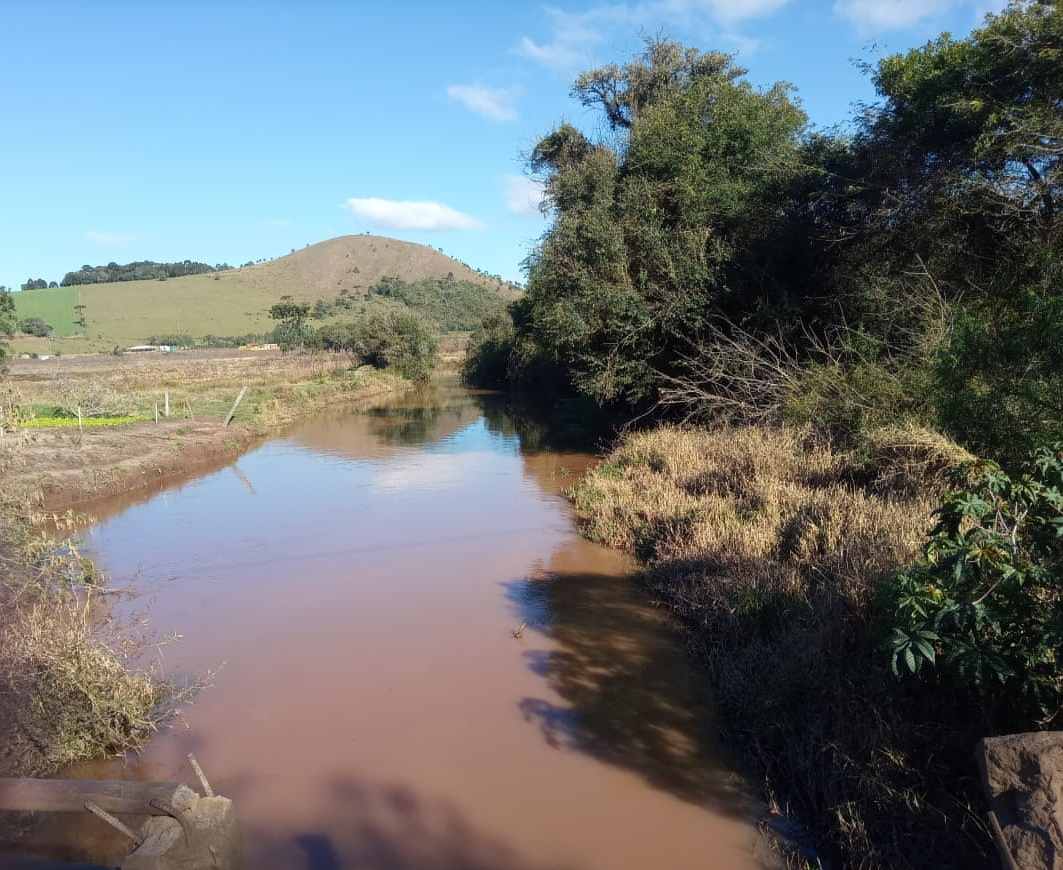

Location
- Country: Brazil

Physical characteristics
- Source
  - location: Paraná state
- Mouth: Iapó River
  - coordinates: 24°45′S 50°5′W

The Piraí River is a river located in the Paraná state of southern Brazil.

== See also ==
- List of rivers of Paraná
