= Ponta Grossa River =

River in Brazil

- Mouth location in Brazil
- Native name: Rio Ponta Grossa (Portuguese)

Location
- Country: Brazil

Physical characteristics
- Source
  - location: Paraná state
- Mouth
  - coordinates: 24°47′46″S 49°16′17″W

Basin features
- River system: Ribeira de Iguape River

The Ponta Grossa River is a river of Paraná state in southern Brazil.

The Ponta Grossa River forms where the Ribeirão Pulador, which drains the Campinhos State Park, joins the Tigre River. The Ponta Grossa River is in turn a right tributary of the Ribeira de Iguape River.

== See also ==
- List of rivers of Paraná
