= Capivari River (Paraná) =

River in Paraná, Brazil

Location
- Country: Brazil

Physical characteristics
- Source
  - location: Paraná state
- Mouth: Pardo River
  - coordinates: 25°0′S 48°36′W

The Capivari River is a river of Paraná state in southern Brazil.

== See also ==
- List of rivers of Paraná
