= Gonçalves Dias River =

River in Brazil

Coordinates: 25°30′01″S 53°40′47″W

Location
- Country: Brazil

Physical characteristics
- Source
  - location: Paraná state

The Gonçalves Dias River is a river of Paraná state in southern Brazil.

== See also ==
- List of rivers of Paraná
