= Serra Negra River =

River in Brazil

Coordinates: 25°15′S 48°25′W

Location
- Country: Brazil

Physical characteristics
- Source
  - location: Paraná state

The Serra Negra River (Portuguese: Rio Serra Negra) is a river of Paraná state in southern Brazil.

At its mouth the river flows through a flat region of unconsolidated sediment of continental and marine origins, where it joins the Tagaçaba River to form the Benito creek. The creek lies in the Guaraqueçaba Ecological Station, which protects the mangroves.

== See also ==
- List of rivers of Paraná
