= Jacaré River (Piquiri River tributary) =

River in Brazil

Location
- Country: Brazil

Physical characteristics
- Source
  - location: Paraná state
- Mouth: Piquiri River
  - coordinates: 24°12′S 53°42′W

The Jacaré River is a river of Paraná state in southern Brazil. It is a tributary of the Piquiri River in the municipality of Iporã.

== See also ==
- List of rivers of Paraná
