= Passa Una River =

River in Brazil

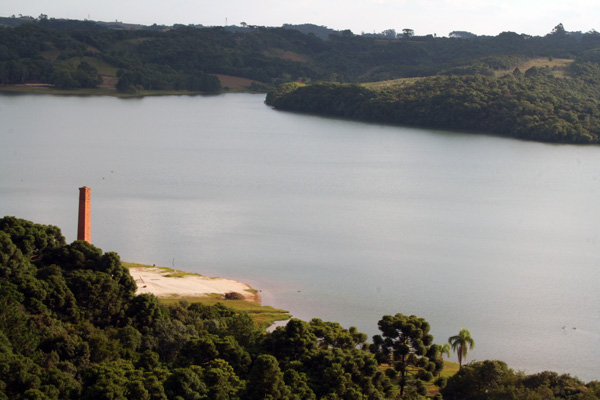

Location
- Country: Brazil

Physical characteristics
- Source
  - location: Paraná state
- Mouth: Iguazu River
  - coordinates: 25°35′S 49°26′W

The Passa Una River is a river of Paraná state in southern Brazil. Arising in the state capital Curitiba, it flows along the border with Campo Largo and flows into the Iguazu River in the municipality of Araucária.

== See also ==
- List of rivers of Paraná
