= Água Branca River =

River in Brazil

Location
- Country: Brazil

Physical characteristics
- Source
  - location: Paraná state
- Mouth: Iguazu River
  - coordinates: 25°50′S 50°15′W

The Água Branca River is a river of Paraná state in southern Brazil.

== See also ==
- List of rivers of Paraná
