= Rio Grande (State of Paraná) =

River in Brazil

Location
- Country: Brazil

Physical characteristics
- Source
  - location: Paraná state
- Mouth: Ribeira de Iguape River
  - coordinates: 24°41′S 48°58′W

Rio Grande (Portuguese for "great river") is a river of Paraná state in southern Brazil.

== See also ==
- List of rivers of Paraná
