= Dos Papagaios River =

River in Brazil

Coordinates: 25.551083°S 49.809252°W

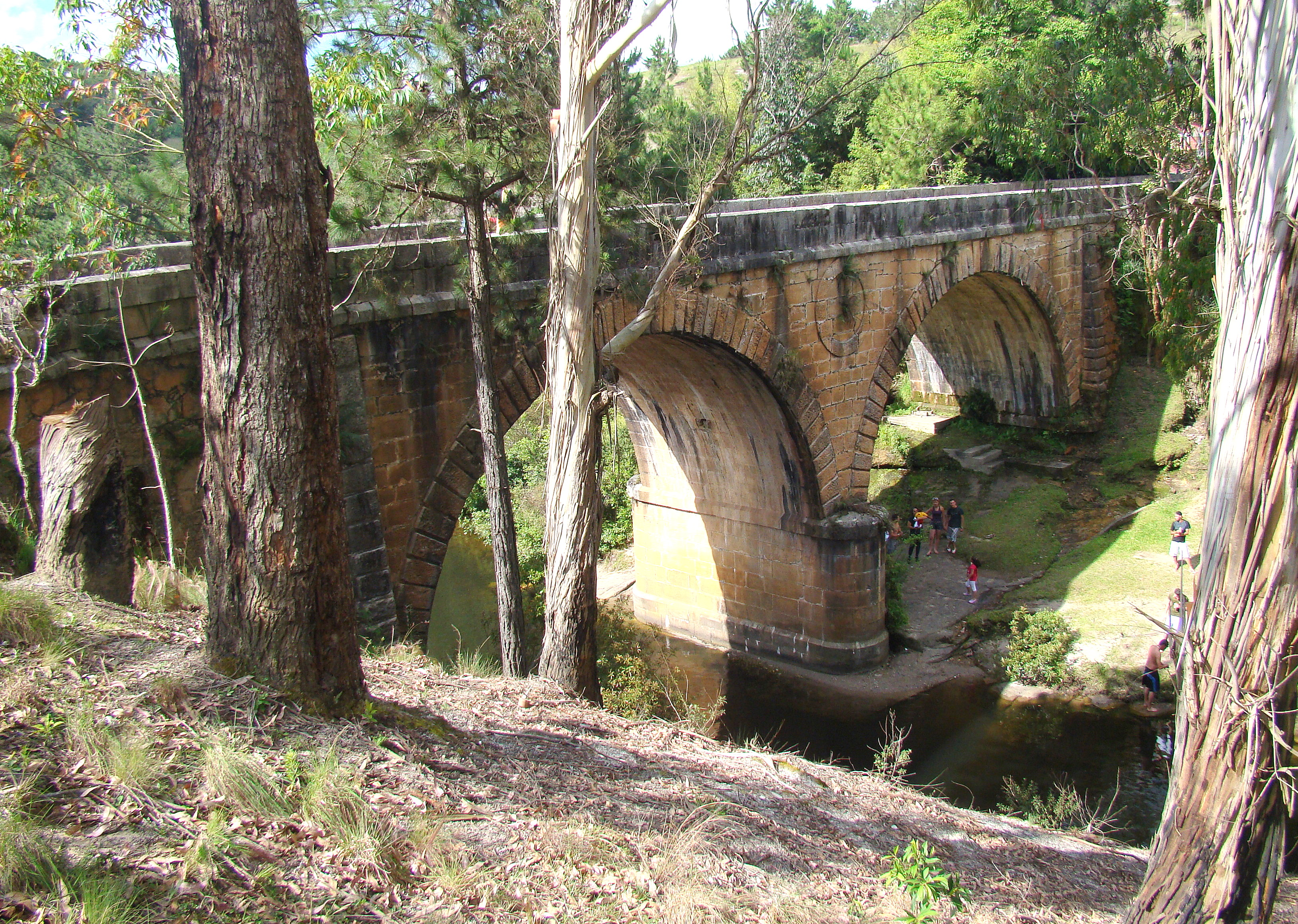

Location
- Country: Brazil

Physical characteristics
- Source
  - location: Paraná state

The Dos Papagaios River ("Rio dos Papagaios") is a river of Paraná state in southern Brazil. It is crossed by the Ponte dos Papagaios, a culturally significant bridge of Paraná built in 1876. The river marks the eastern border of Porto Amazonas municipality.

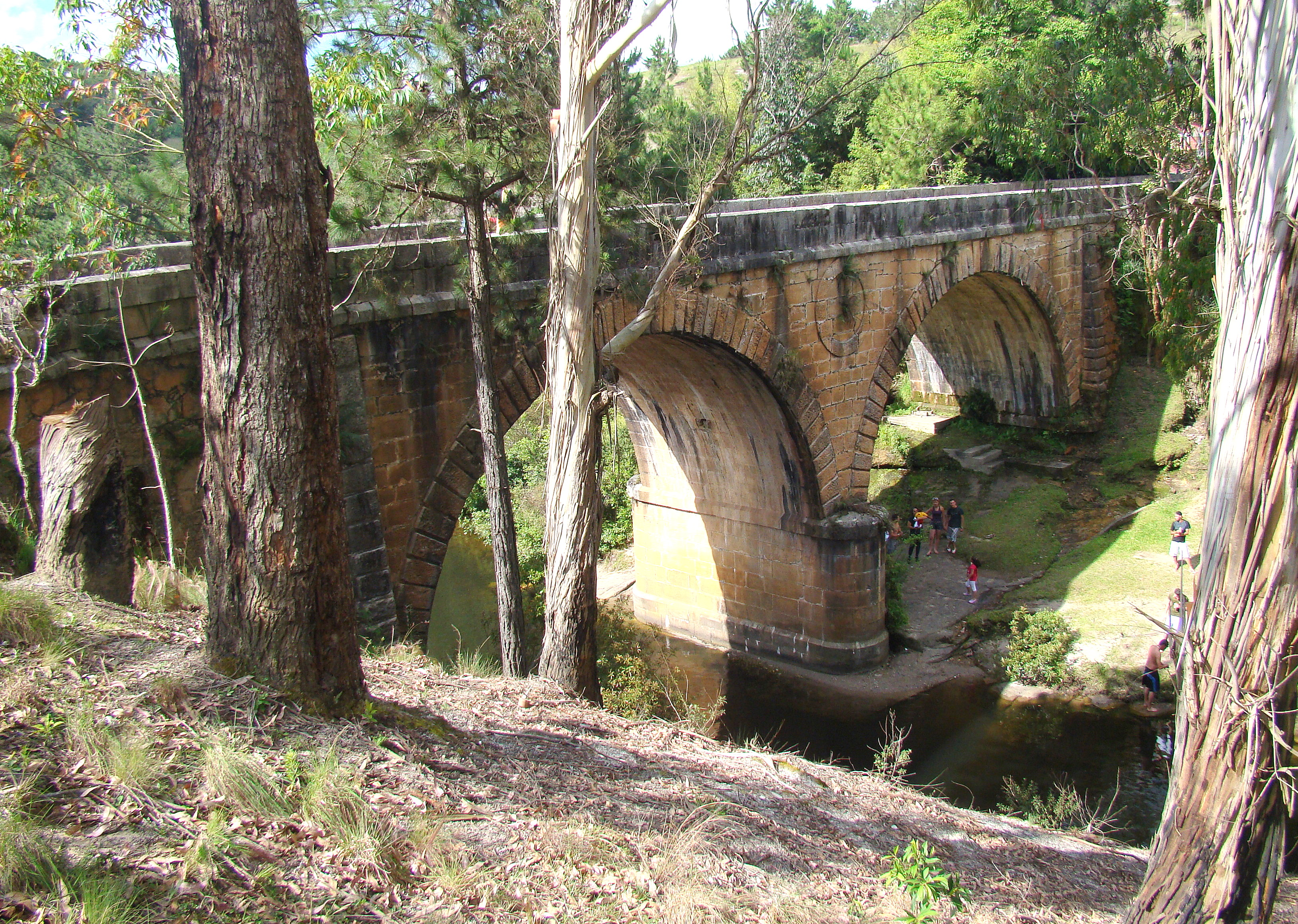
the Ponte dos Papagaios across the Rio dos Papagaios

== See also ==
- List of rivers of Paraná
