= Da Várzea River (Negro River tributary) =

River in Brazil

Location
- Country: Brazil

Physical characteristics
- Source
  - location: Paraná state
- Mouth: Rio Negro
  - coordinates: 26°1′S 49°56′W

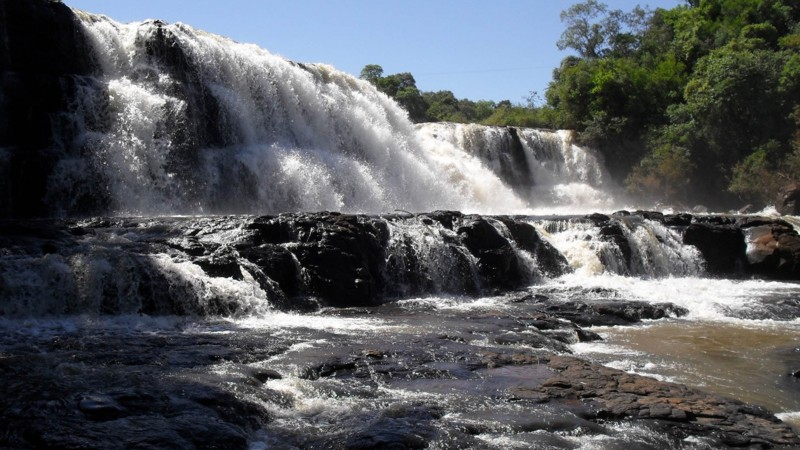
Da Várzea River

The Da Várzea River is a river of Paraná state in southern Brazil. It is a tributary of the Rio Negro.

== See also ==
- List of rivers of Paraná
