= Rio Mourão =

River of Paraná state, Brazil

Coordinates: 23°42′23″S 52°06′44″W

Mourão River
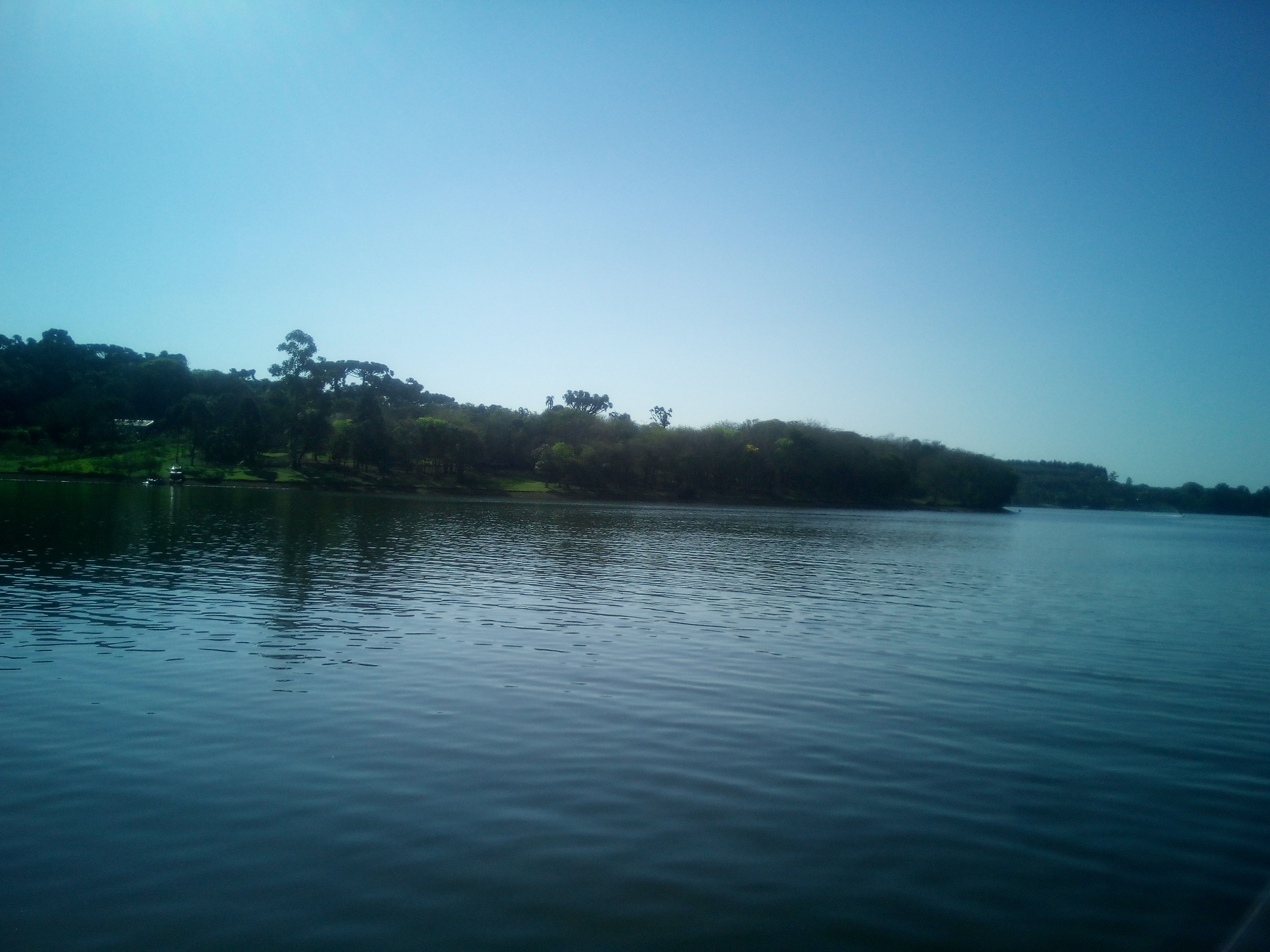

Location
- Country: Brazil

Physical characteristics
- Source
  - location: Paraná state

The Mourão River is a river of Paraná state in southern Brazil.

== See also ==
- List of rivers of Paraná
