= Bandeira River (Piquiri River tributary) =

River in Brazil

Location
- Country: Brazil

Physical characteristics
- Source
  - location: Paraná state
- Mouth: Piquiri River
  - coordinates: 25°3′S 52°32′W

The Bandeira River is a river of Paraná state in southern Brazil. It is a tributary of the Piquiri River.

== See also ==
- List of rivers of Paraná
