= Encantado River =

River in Brazil

Coordinates: 24°14′52″S 53°36′56″W

Location
- Country: Brazil

Physical characteristics
- Source
  - location: Paraná state

The Encantado River is a river of Paraná state in southern Brazil.

== See also ==
- List of rivers of Paraná
