= Da Areia River (Iguazu River tributary) =

River in Brazil

Location
- Country: Brazil

Physical characteristics
- Source
  - location: Paraná state
- Mouth: Iguazu River
  - coordinates: 26°1′S 51°36′W

The Da Areia River is a river of Paraná state in southern Brazil. It is a tributary of the Iguazu River.

== See also ==
- List of rivers of Paraná
