= Piedade River =

River in Brazil

Location
- Country: Brazil

Physical characteristics
- Source
  - location: Paraná state
- Mouth: Ribeira de Iguape River
  - location: Cerro Azul
  - coordinates: 24°53′S 49°24′W

The Piedade River is a river of Paraná state in southern Brazil.

== See also ==
- List of rivers of Paraná
