= Das Antas River (Tibagi River tributary) =

River in Brazil

- Location of the mouth in Brazil

Location
- Country: Brazil

Physical characteristics
- Source
  - location: Paraná state
- Mouth: Tibagi River
  - coordinates: 24°1′56″S 50°41′31″W

The Das Antas River is a river of Paraná state in southern Brazil. It is a tributary of the Tibagi River.

== See also ==
- List of rivers of Paraná
