= Capanema, Paraná =

Capanema, Paraná, Brazil
- Municipality
- Flag Coat of arms
- Interactive map of Capanema, Paraná, Brazil
- Coordinates: 25°40′19″S 53°48′32″W
- Country: Brazil
- Region: South
- State: Paraná

Area
  - Total: 161.663 sq mi (418.705 km^{2})

Population (2020)
  - Total: 19,148
  - Density: 118.44/sq mi (45.731/km^{2})
- Time zone: UTC−3 (BRT)

Capanema is a municipality in the state of Paraná in the South Region of Brazil.
