= Imbituva River =

River in Brazil

Coordinates: 25°05′54″S 50°22′07″W

Location
- Country: Brazil

Physical characteristics
- Source
  - location: Paraná state

The Imbituva River is a river of Paraná state in southern Brazil.

== See also ==
- List of rivers of Paraná
