= Do Cobre River =

River in Brazil

Location
- Country: Brazil

Physical characteristics
- Source
  - location: Paraná state
- Mouth: Piquiri River
  - coordinates: 25°2′S 52°26′W

The Do Cobre River is a river of Paraná state in southern Brazil. It flows into the Iguazu Falls.

== See also ==
- List of rivers of Paraná
