= Dos Indios River (lower Ivaí River tributary) =

River in Brazil

Location
- Country: Brazil

Physical characteristics
- Source
  - location: Paraná state
- Mouth: Ivaí River
  - coordinates: 23°22′S 52°32′W

The Dos Indios River is a river of Paraná state in southern Brazil.

== See also ==
- List of rivers of Paraná
