= Açunguí River =

River in Brazil

- Location within Brazil
- Native name: Rio Açunguí (Portuguese)

Location
- Country: Brazil

Physical characteristics
- Source
  - location: Paraná state
  - coordinates: 25.467055°S 49.704105°W
- Mouth
  - coordinates: 24.906299°S 49.472466°W

Basin features
- River system: Ribeira de Iguape River

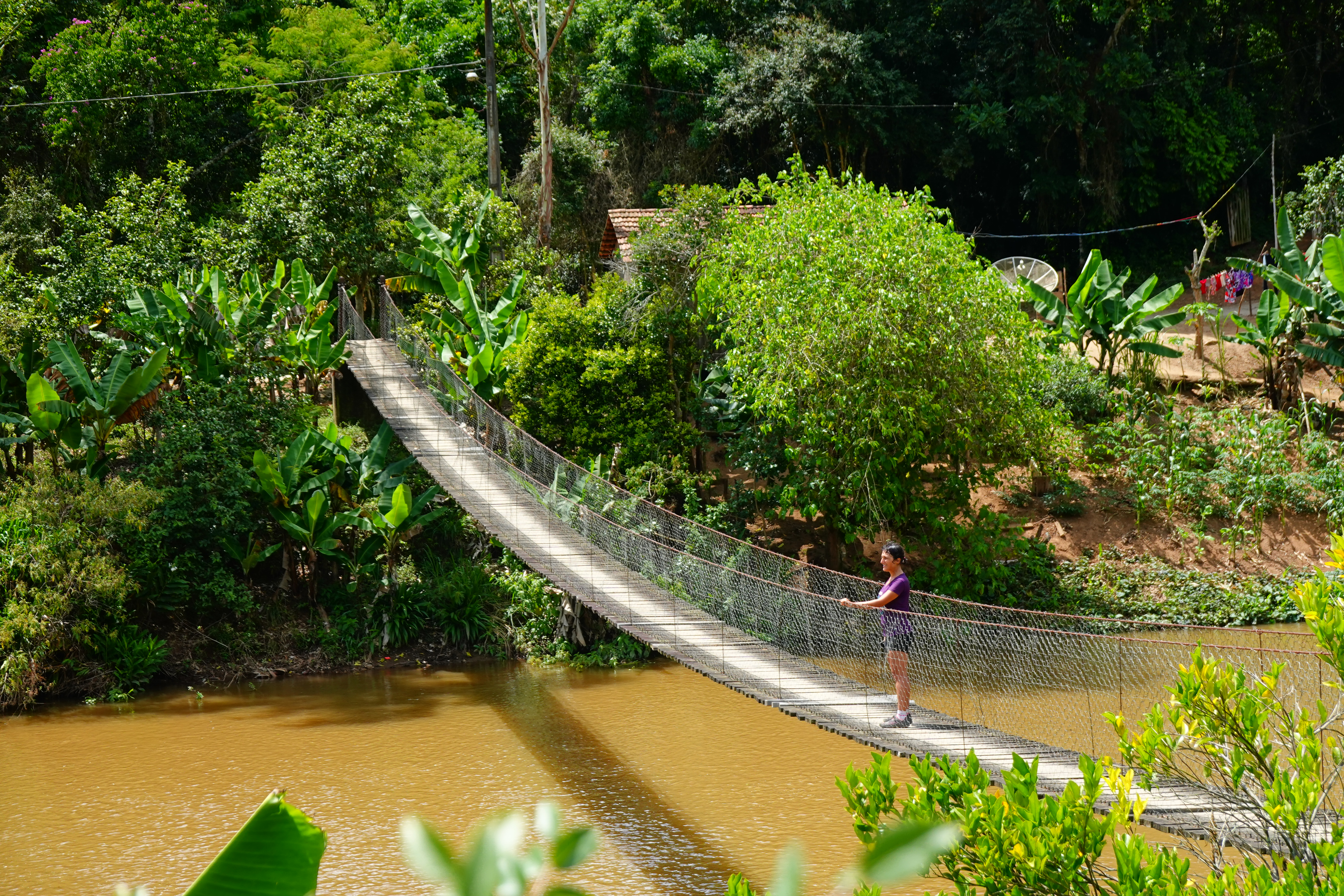

The Açunguí River (Portuguese: Rio Açunguí) is a river of Paraná state in southern Brazil. It is a headwater of the Ribeira de Iguape River.

== Basin ==
The Açungui river basin is the last natural reserve of unpolluted water to supply the metropolitan region of Curitiba. The basin includes the Açungui National Forest, created in 1944 under the government of Getúlio Vargas as the Romário Martins Park, with an area of 3,728 hectares (9,210 acres). The national forest preserves araucarias. The river basin covers about 1,800 square kilometres (690 sq mi).

== Course ==
The river rises in the foothills of the Serra de São Luiz do Purunã, Paraná. The river rises to the northwest of Curitiba and flows in a generally northeast direction to join the Ribeira River, which flows east into São Paulo. The Açungui valley is steep, with many small canyons and very close to the National Forest, so the environment has been well preserved. There are rapids along the river, particularly in the Canyon do Acalantilado, making it an excellent place for rafting. The Ribeira de Iguape River forms at the confluence of the Ribeirinha River and the Açungui River in the state of Paraná, less than 100 kilometres (62 mi) from Curitiba.

The river's hydroelectric potential has been of interest since the 1950s, but the larger plants on the Iguaçu River gained priority. Large hydroelectric plants, with their large environmental impact, are now out of fashion, and the potential for a series of small hydroelectric plants along the Açungui was being considered in 2015.

== See also ==
- List of rivers of Paraná

== Sources ==
- Mapa Rodoviário Paraná (PDF) (in Portuguese), Brazilian Ministry of Transport
- Potencial hidrelétrico do Rio Açungui é debatido na tribuna livre (in Portuguese), Sindimovec: Sindicato dos Trabalhadores nas Empresas Montadoras de Veículos, Chassis e Motores de Campo Largo - PR, 19 August 2015
- "Rio Ribeira (PR/SP)", Brasil das Águas (in Portuguese), Safari Air Empreendimentos Ltda
- Spinelli, Daniel (6 October 2006), Rio Açungui: um excelente local para praticar rafting (in Portuguese), 360 Graus Multimídia
