= Corvo River =

Location
- Country: Brazil

Physical characteristics
- Source
  - location: Paraná state
- Mouth: Paranapanema River
  - coordinates: 22°37′S 52°48′W

The Corvo River is a river of Paraná state in southeastern Brazil. It is a tributary of the Paranapanema on the border with São Paulo state.

== See also ==
- List of rivers of Paraná
