= Bitumirim River =

Location
- Country: Brazil

Physical characteristics
- Source
  - location: Paraná state
- Mouth: Tibagi River
  - coordinates: 25°0′S 50°26′W

The Bitumirim River is a river of Paraná state in south Brazil. Rising in Ipiranga municipality, it flows eastwards to join the Tibagi River.

== See also ==
- List of rivers of Paraná
