= Guaraúna River =

Location
- Country: Brazil

Physical characteristics
- Source
  - location: Paraná state
- Mouth: Tibagi River
  - coordinates: 25°9′S 50°16′W

The Guaraúna River is a river of Paraná state in southeastern Brazil. It is a tributary of the Tibagi River.

== See also ==
- List of rivers of Paraná
