= Goioerê River =

River in Brazil

Location
- Country: Brazil

Physical characteristics
- Source
  - location: Paraná state
- Mouth: Piquiri River
  - coordinates: 24°12′S 53°19′W

The Goioerê River is a river of Paraná state in southern Brazil, a tributary of the Piquiri River. The name means "field of water" in the local Kaingang language.

== See also ==
- List of rivers of Paraná
