= Dos Indios River (upper Ivaí River tributary) =

River in Brazil

Location
- Country: Brazil

Physical characteristics
- Source
  - location: Paraná state
- Mouth: Ivaí River
  - coordinates: 24°58′S 51°1′W

The Dos Indios River is a river of Paraná state in southern Brazil.

== See also ==
- List of rivers of Paraná
