= Pinguim River =

Location
- Country: Brazil

Physical characteristics
- Source
  - location: Paraná state
- Mouth: Ivaí River
  - coordinates: 23°40′S 52°6′W

The Pinguim River is a river of Paraná state in southern Brazil. It is a tributary of the Ivaí River.

== See also ==
- List of rivers of Paraná
