= Marrecas River (Santana River tributary) =

River in Brazil

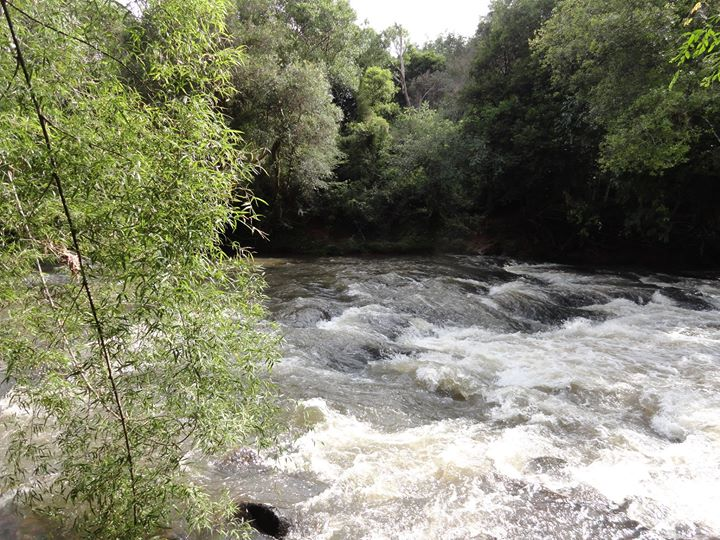

Location
- Country: Brazil

Physical characteristics
- Source
  - location: Paraná state
- Mouth: Santana River
  - coordinates: 25°56′S 52°55′W

The Marrecas River is a river of Paraná state in southern Brazil. It is a tributary of the Santana River.

== See also ==
- List of rivers of Paraná
