= Araras River (Ivaí River tributary) =

Araras River Arurão River

Location
- Country: Brazil

Physical characteristics
- Source
  - location: Paraná state
- Mouth: Ivaí River
  - coordinates: 23°52′S 51°59′W

The Araras River or Arurão River is a river in Paraná state in southeastern Brazil. It is a tributary of the Ivaí River.

== See also ==
- List of rivers of Paraná
