= Jacaré River (Das Cinzas River tributary) =

River in Brazil

Jacaré River Jacarezinho River

Location
- Country: Brazil

Physical characteristics
- Source
  - location: Paraná state
- Mouth: Das Cinzas River
  - coordinates: 23°8′S 50°14′W

The Jacaré River, or Jacarezinho River, is a river in the Paraná state in southern Brazil. It is a tributary of the Das Cinzas River and inspired the name of the town of Jacarezinho.

== See also ==
- List of rivers of Paraná
