= Das Antas River (Bom River tributary) =

River in Brazil

Location
- Country: Brazil

Physical characteristics
- Source
  - location: Paraná state
- Mouth: Bom River
  - coordinates: 23°51′S 51°30′W

The Das Antas River is a river of Paraná state in southern Brazil. It is a tributary of the Bom River.

== See also ==
- List of rivers of Paraná
