= Três Bôcas River =

Location
- Country: Brazil

Physical characteristics
- Source
  - location: Paraná state
- Mouth: Tibagi River
  - coordinates: 23°22′S 51°1′W

The Três Bôcas River is a river of Paraná state in southeastern Brazil. It is a tributary of the Tibagi River.

== See also ==
- List of rivers of Paraná
