= Pitangui River =

River in Brazil

Coordinates: 24.8553°S 50.2939°W

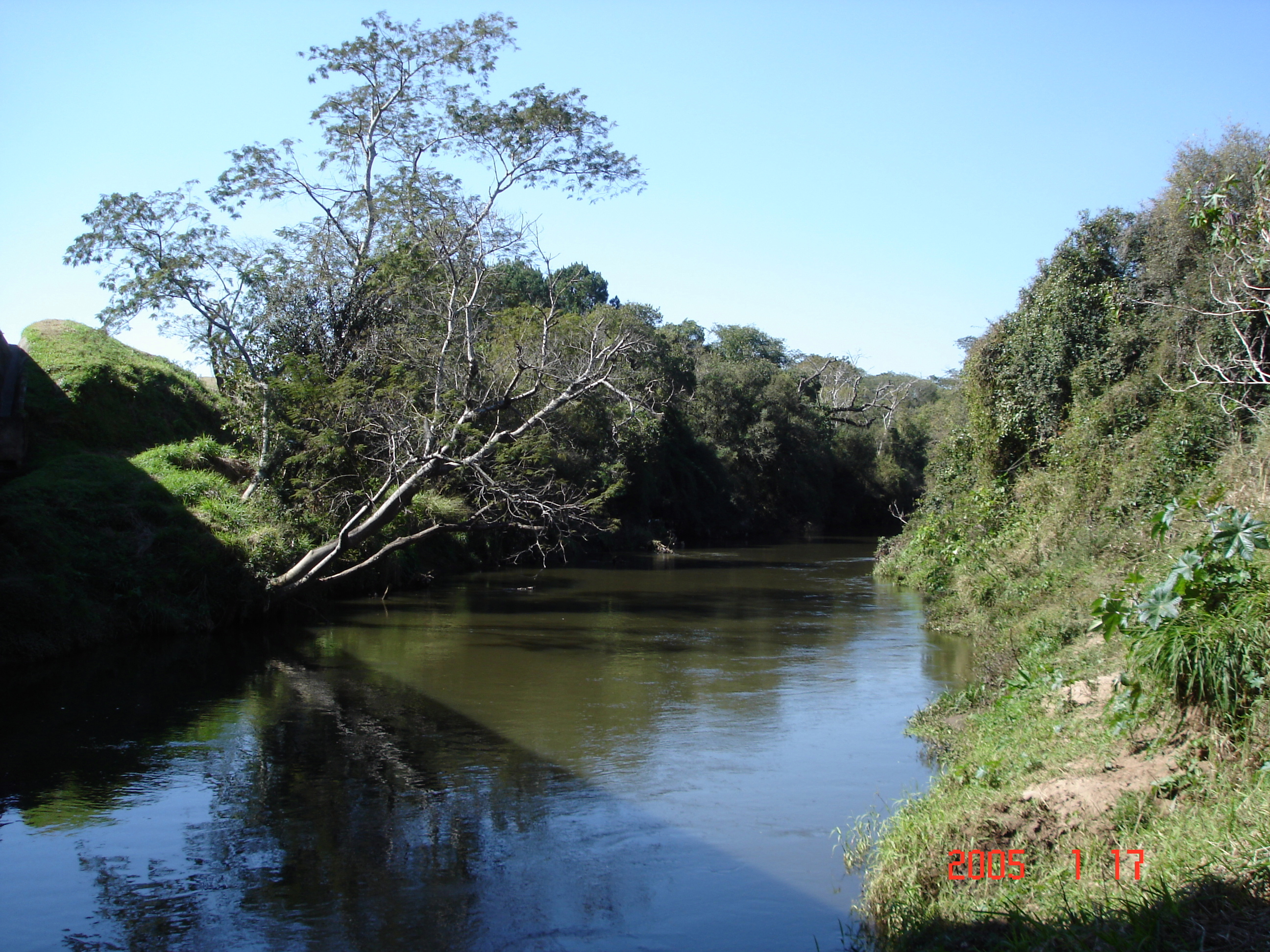
- Rio Pitangui, Paraná - Brasil

Location
- Country: Brazil

Physical characteristics
- Source
  - location: Paraná state

The Pitangui River is a river of Paraná state in southern Brazil.

== See also ==
- List of rivers of Paraná
