= Iratim River =

River in Brazil

Coordinates: 26°01′50″S 51°52′49″W

Location
- Country: Brazil

Physical characteristics
- Source
  - location: Paraná state

The Iratim River is a river of Paraná state in southern Brazil.

== See also ==
- List of rivers of Paraná
