= Cavernoso River =

River in Brazil

Coordinates: 25°41′43″S 52°23′28″W

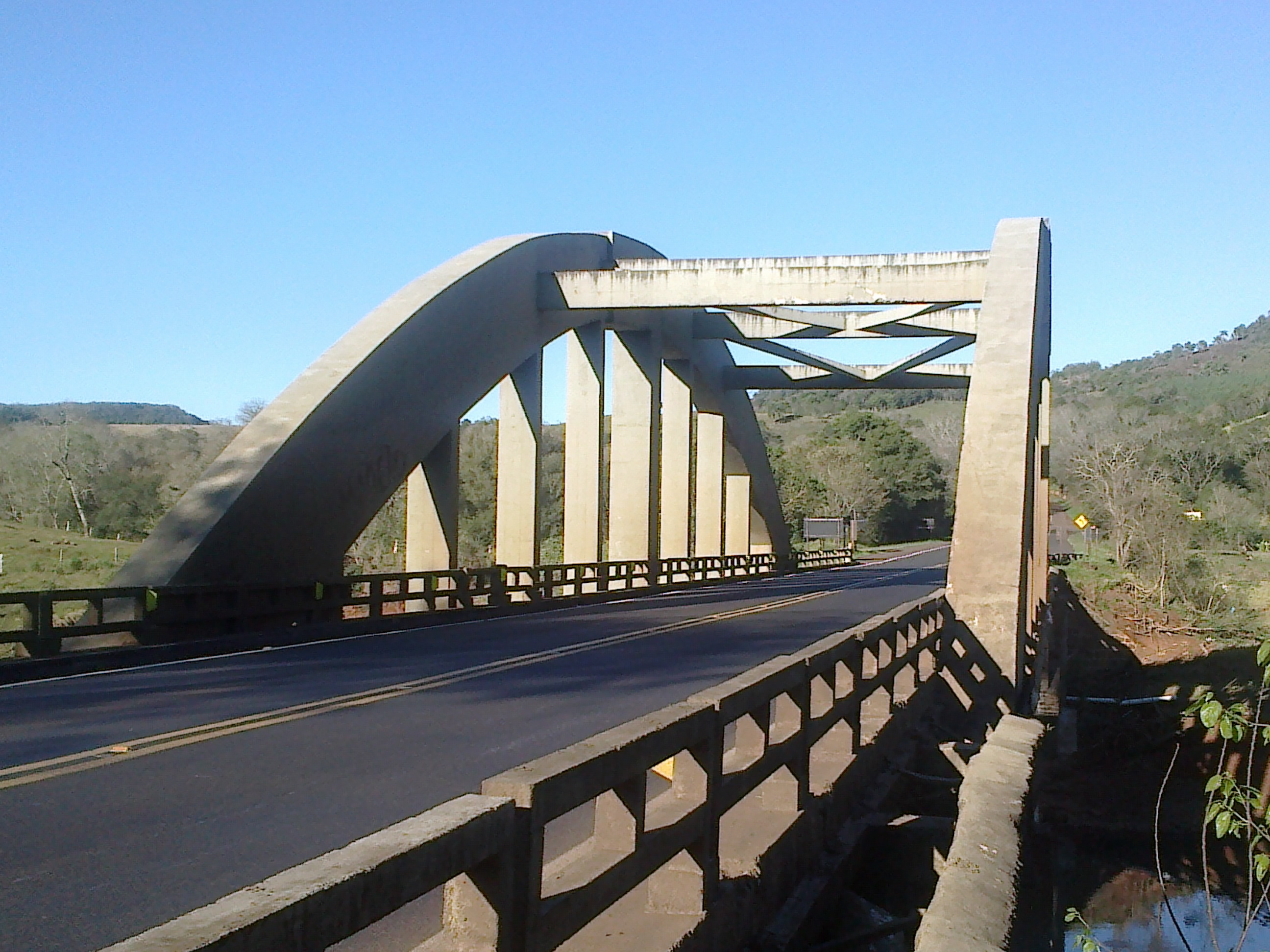
- Bridge over the Cavernoso River.

Location
- Country: Brazil

Physical characteristics
- Source
  - location: Paraná state

The Cavernoso River is a river of Paraná state in southern Brazil.

== See also ==
- List of rivers of Paraná
