= Dos Patos River (Ivaí River tributary) =

River in Brazil

Location
- Country: Brazil

Physical characteristics
- Source
  - location: Paraná state
- Mouth: Ivaí River
  - coordinates: 24°59′S 51°2′W

The Dos Patos River is a river of Paraná state in southern Brazil. It is a tributary of the Ivaí River.

== See also ==
- List of rivers of Paraná
