= Corumbataí River (Paraná) =

River in Brazil

Location
- Country: Brazil

Physical characteristics
- Source
  - location: Paraná state
- Mouth: Ivaí River
  - coordinates: 23°54′S 51°56′W

The Corumbataí River is river of Paraná which is a state in southern Brazil.

== See also ==
- List of rivers of Paraná
