= Acari River (Minas Gerais) =

Location
- Country: Brazil

Physical characteristics
- Source
  - location: Minas Gerais state
- Mouth: São Francisco River
  - coordinates: 16°0′S 45°3′W

The Acari River is a river in Minas Gerais state in southeastern Brazil.

== See also ==
- List of rivers of Minas Gerais

== Rivers similar to or like Acari River (Minas Gerais) ==
- Pardo River (São Francisco River tributary) River of Minas Gerais state in southeastern Brazil. Tributary of the São Francisco River. Wikipedia
- Paracatu River (Brasília de Minas) River of Minas Gerais state in southeastern Brazil. It joins the São Francisco River just 12 km north of the mouth of its much larger namesake the Paracatu River on the opposite bank. Wikipedia
- Colindó River River of Minas Gerais state in southeastern Brazil. List of rivers of Minas Gerais Wikipedia
- Pacuí River (São Francisco River tributary) River of Minas Gerais state in southeastern Brazil. Tributary of the São Francisco River. Wikipedia
- Indaiá River River of Minas Gerais state in southeastern Brazil. List of rivers of Minas Gerais Wikipedia
- Japoré River River of Minas Gerais state in southeastern Brazil. List of rivers of Minas Gerais Wikipedia
