= List of rivers of Minas Gerais =

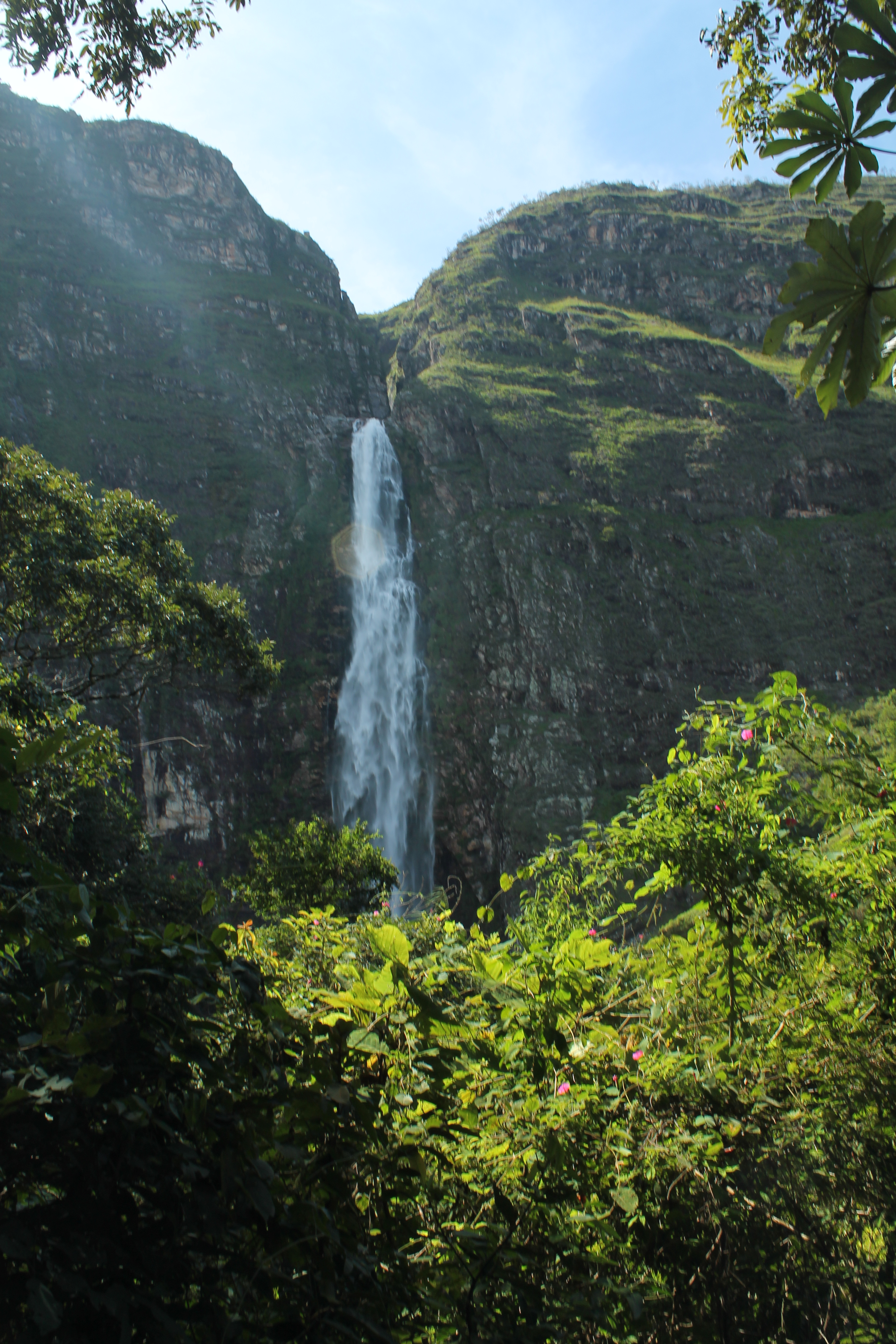
Casca d'Anta waterfall, the highest fall of São Francisco River.

List of rivers in Minas Gerais (Brazilian State). The list is arranged by drainage basin, with respective tributaries indented under each larger stream's name and ordered from downstream to upstream. All rivers in Minas Gerais drain to the Atlantic Ocean.

== By Drainage Basin ==
=== São Francisco Basin ===
- São Francisco River
  - Carinhanha River
    - Coxá River
  - Colindó River
  - Verde Grande River
    - Verde Pequeno River
      - Poço Triste River
    - Gorutuba River
      - Pacuí River
      - Mosquito River
  - Japoré River
  - Itacarambi River
  - Peruaçu River
  - Pandeiros River
  - Pardo River
  - Acari River
  - Urucuia River
    - Piratinga River
  - Paracatu River
  - Paracatu River
    - Do Sono River
      - Santo Antônio River
    - Caatinga River
    - Preto River
      - Salabro River
    - Da Prata River
    - Escuro River
      - Escurinho River
    - Santa Catarina River
  - Pacuí River
  - Jequitaí River
  - Das Velhas River
    - Bicudo River
    - Curimataí River
    - Pardo River
    - Cipó River
  - Abaeté River
  - Borrachudo River
  - Indaiá River
  - Paraopeba River
    - Manso River
  - Marmelada River
  - Pará River
    - Do Peixe River
    - Lambari River
    - Itapecerica River

=== Atlantic Coast ===
- Pardo River
  - Mosquito River
  - São João do Paraíso River
  - Pardinho River
- Jequitinhonha River
  - Rubim do Norte River
  - Rubim do Sul River
  - São Francisco River
  - São Miguel River
  - São Pedro River
  - Itinga River
  - Piauí River
  - Araçuaí River
    - Preto River
    - Gravatá River
    - Setúbal River
    - Capivara River
    - Fanado River
    - Itamarandiba River
  - Salinas River
  - Vacaria River
  - Itacambiruçu River
  - Macaúba River
  - Tabatinga River
- Jucurucu River (Rio do Prado)
- Itanhaém River
- Mucuri River
  - Pampã River
  - Todos os Santos River
- São Mateus River (Espírito Santo)
  - Braço Norte do Rio São Mateus (Cotaxé River)
  - Braço Sul do Rio São Mateus (Cricaré River)
- Doce River
  - Manhuaçu River
  - Cuiaté River
  - Suaçuí Grande River
    - Itambacurí River
    - Urupaça River
  - Suaçuí Pequeno River
  - Corrente River
  - Santo Antônio River
  - Piracicaba River
  - Matipó River
  - Do Carmo River
    - Gualaxo do Sul River
      - Mainart River
- Itabapoana River
- Paraíba do Sul
  - Muriaé River
    - Carangola River
  - Pomba River
    - Novo River
  - Pirapetinga River
  - Cágado River
  - Paraibuna River
    - Preto River
    - Do Peixe River

=== Paraná River Basin ===
- Paraná River (Argentina, Mato Grosso do Sul)
  - Tietê River (São Paulo)
    - Piracicaba River (São Paulo)
      - Jaguari River
        - Camanducaia River
  - Grande River
    - Verde River
    - Pardo River
      - Moji-Guaçu River
        - Jaguari Mirim River
        - Rio do Peixe
          - Corrente River
      - Canoas River
      - Guaxupé River
      - Capivari River
    - Uberaba River
    - São João River
    - Sapucaí River
      - Muzambo River
      - Cabo Verde River
        - Do Peixe River
      - Machado River
      - Verde River
        - Lambari River
        - Baependi River
      - Dourado River
      - Sapucai-Mirim River
        - Mandu River
        - Itaim River
    - Santana River
    - Jacaré River
    - Rio das Mortes
      - Elvas River
    - Ingaí River
      - Capivari River
    - Aiuruoca River
      - Turvo River
  - Paranaíba River
    - São Domingos River
      - Dos Arantes River
    - Tijuco River
      - Da Prata River
    - Araguari River (Das Velhas River)
      - Uberabinha River
      - Claro River
      - Quebra-Anzol River
    - Bagagem River
    - Dourados River
    - São Marcos River
    - Verde River

== Alphabetically ==
- Abaeté River
- Acari River
- Aiuruoca River
- Araçuaí River
- Araguari River (Das Velhas River)
- Dos Arantes River
- Baependi River
- Bagagem River
- Bicudo River
- Borrachudo River
- Caatinga River
- Cabo Verde River
- Cágado River
- Camanducaia River
- Canoas River
- Capivara River
- Capivari River
- Capivari River
- Carangola River
- Carinhanha River
- Do Carmo River
- Cipó River
- Claro River
- Colindó River
- Corrente River
- Corrente River
- Coxá River
- Cuiaté River
- Curimataí River
- Doce River
- Dourado River
- Dourados River
- Elvas River
- Escuro River
- Escurinho River
- Fanado River
- Gorutuba River
- Grande River
- Gravatá River
- Gualaxo do Sul River
- Guaxupé River
- Indaiá River
- Ingaí River
- Itabapoana River
- Itacambiruçu River
- Itacarambi River
- Itaim River
- Itamarandiba River
- Itambacurí River
- Itanhaém River
- Itapecerica River
- Itinga River
- Jacaré River
- Jaguari River
- Jaguari Mirim River
- Japoré River
- Jequitaí River
- Jequitinhonha River
- Jucurucu River (Rio do Prado)
- Lambari River
- Macaúba River
- Machado River
- Mainart River
- Mandu River
- Manhuaçu River
- Manso River
- Marmelada River
- Matipó River
- Moji-Guaçu River
- Rio das Mortes
- Mosquito River
- Mosquito River
- Mucuri River
- Muriaé River
- Muzambo River
- Novo River
- Pacuí River
- Pacuí River
- Pampã River
- Pandeiros River
- Pará River
- Paracatu River
- Paracatu River
- Paraíba do Sul
- Paraibuna River
- Paranaíba River
- Paraopeba River
- Pardinho River
- Pardo River
- Pardo River
- Pardo River
- Pardo River
- Rio do Peixe (Mojiguaçu River)
- Do Peixe River
- Do Peixe River
- Do Peixe River
- Peruaçu River
- Piauí River
- Piracicaba River
- Pirapetinga River
- Piratinga River
- Poço Triste River
- Pomba River
- Da Prata River
- Da Prata River
- Preto River
- Preto River
- Quebra-Anzol River
- Rubim do Norte River
- Rubim do Sul River
- Salabro River
- Salinas River
- Santa Catarina River
- Santana River
- Santo Antônio River
- Santo Antônio River
- São Domingos River
- São Francisco River
- São Francisco River
- São João do Paraíso River
- São João River
- São Marcos River
- Braço Norte do Rio São Mateus (Cotaxé River)
- Braço Sul do Rio São Mateus (Cricaré River)
- São Miguel River
- São Pedro River
- Sapucaí River
- Sapucai-Mirim River
- Setúbal River
- Do Sono River
- Suaçuí Grande River
- Suaçuí Pequeno River
- Tabatinga River
- Tijuco River
- Todos os Santos River
- Turvo River
- Uberaba River
- Uberabinha River
- Urucuia River
- Urupaça River
- Vacaria River
- Das Velhas River
- Verde Grande River
- Verde Pequeno River
- Verde River
- Verde River
- Verde River
