= Lambari River =

Lambari River may refer to:

- Lambari River (Pará River)
- Lambari River (Verde River)

== See also ==
- Lambari (disambiguation)
