= Pacuí River =

Pacuí River may refer to:

- Pacuí River (Gorutuba River), a river in Brazil
- Pacuí River (São Francisco River), a river in Brazil
