= Dourado River =

There are several rivers named Dourado or Dourados River in Brazil:

- Dourado River (Minas Gerais)
- Dourado River (Rio Grande do Sul)
- Dourado River (São Paulo)
- Dourados River (Goiás)
- Dourados River (Mato Grosso do Sul)
- Dourados River (Minas Gerais)

== See also ==
- São José dos Dourados River
- Dorado River, Argentina
- Dourado (disambiguation)
