= Da Prata River =

Da Prata River or Rio da Prata is the name of several rivers in Brazil:

- Da Prata River (Espírito Santo)
- Da Prata River (Goiás)
- Da Prata River (Paracatu River tributary), Minas Gerais
- Da Prata River (Tijuco River tributary), Minas Gerais
- Da Prata River (Paraná)
- Da Prata River (Rio Grande do Sul)
- Da Prata River (Santa Catarina)
- Da Prata River (Tocantins)
