= Corrente River =

Corrente River or Correntes River may refer to:

- Corrente River (Bahia), Bahia, Brazil
- Corrente River (Doce River), Minas Gerais, Brazil
- Corrente River (Paranã River), Goiás, Brazil
- Corrente River (Paranaíba River), Goiás, Brazil
- Corrente River (Piauí), Piauí, Brazil
- Corrente River (Rio do Peixe), Minas Gerais, Brazil
- Correntes River (Maranhão), Maranhão, Brazil
- Correntes River (Mato Grosso), Mato Grosso, Brazil
- Correntes River (Santa Catarina), Santa Catarina, Brazil
