= Escuro River =

Escuro River or Rio Escuro (Portuguese for dark river) may refer to:

- Escuro River (Minas Gerais), Brazil
- Escuro River (Tocantins), Brazil
