= Escurinho =

Escurinho may refer to:

- Escurinho (footballer, born 1930) (1930–2020), Brazilian football attacking midfielder Benedito Custódio Ferreira
- Escurinho (footballer, born 1950) (1950–2011), Brazilian football striker Luís Carlos Machado
- Escurinho River, Minas Gerais, Brazil
