= Santo Antônio River (Do Sono River tributary) =

Location
- Country: Brazil

Physical characteristics
- Source
  - location: Minas Gerais state
- Mouth: Do Sono River
  - coordinates: 17°29′S 45°37′W

The Santo Antônio River is a river of Minas Gerais state in southeastern Brazil. It is a tributary of the Do Sono River.

== See also ==
- List of rivers of Minas Gerais
