= Uberaba River =

There are two rivers named Uberaba River in Brazil:

- Uberaba River (Minas Gerais)
- Uberaba River (Paraná)

== See also ==
- Uberaba, a municipality in Minas Gerais, Brazil
