= Mosquito River (Pardo River tributary) =

Location
- Country: Brazil

Physical characteristics
- Source
  - location: Minas Gerais state
- Mouth: Pardo River
  - coordinates: 15°30′S 41°21′W

The Mosquito River is a river of Minas Gerais state in southeastern Brazil. It is a tributary of the Pardo River.

== See also ==
- List of rivers of Minas Gerais
