= Camanducaia River =

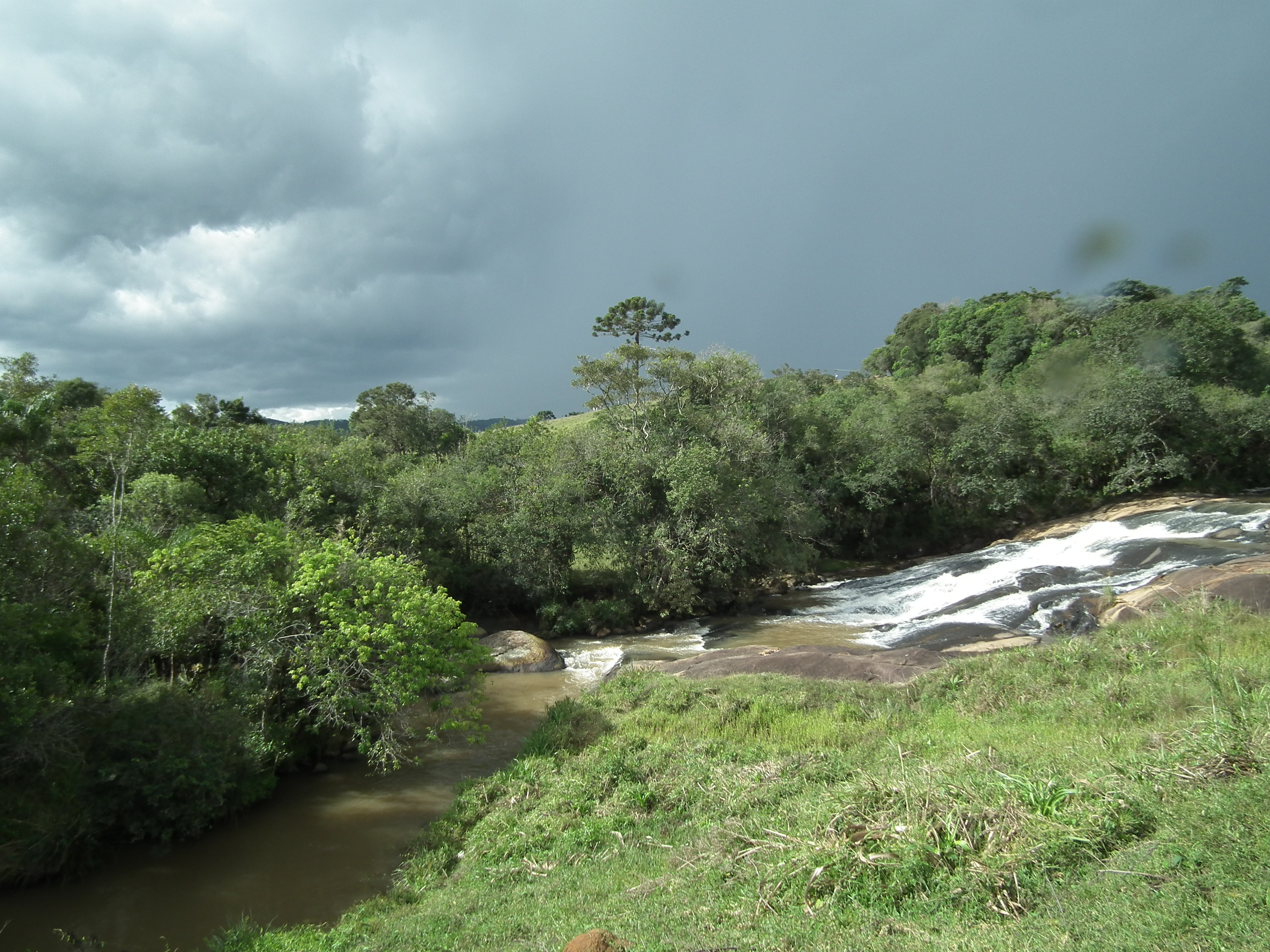
- Camanducaia River near Pedra Bela

Location
- Country: Brazil

Physical characteristics
- Source
  - location: Minas Gerais
- Mouth: Jaguari River
  - coordinates: 22°41′S 47°2′W

The Camanducaia River is a river which rises in Minas Gerais and flows through São Paulo state in southeastern Brazil.

== See also ==
- List of rivers of São Paulo
- List of rivers of Minas Gerais
