= Pardinho River (Minas Gerais) =

Location
- Country: Brazil

Physical characteristics
- Source
  - location: Minas Gerais state
- Mouth: Pardo River
  - coordinates: 15°36′S 42°32′W

The Pardinho River is a river of Minas Gerais state in southeastern Brazil.

== See also ==
- List of rivers of Minas Gerais
