= Mosquito River (Minas Gerais) =

- Mouth location in Brazil
- Native name: Rio Mosquito (Portuguese)

Location
- Country: Brazil

Physical characteristics
- Source
  - location: Minas Gerais state
- Mouth
  - coordinates: 15°36′13″S 43°16′37″W

Basin features
- River system: Gorutuba River

The Mosquito River is a river of Minas Gerais state in southeastern Brazil. It is a tributary of the Gorutuba River.

The river rises in the Serra do Talhado, in the 49,830 hectares (123,100 acres) Serra Nova State Park. It flows west to join the Gorutuba.

== See also ==
- List of rivers of Minas Gerais
