= Gualaxo do Sul River =

Location
- Country: Brazil

Physical characteristics
- Source
  - location: Minas Gerais state
- Mouth: Do Carmo River
  - coordinates: 20°21′S 43°11′W

The Gualaxo do Sul River is a river of Minas Gerais state in southeastern Brazil. It is a tributary of the Do Carmo River.

== See also ==
- List of rivers of Minas Gerais
