= Do Peixe River (Pará River tributary) =

Location
- Country: Brazil

Physical characteristics
- Source
  - location: Minas Gerais state
- Mouth: Pará River
  - coordinates: 19°27′S 45°0′W

The Do Peixe River is a river of Minas Gerais state in southeastern Brazil. It is a tributary of the Pará River.

== See also ==
- List of rivers of Minas Gerais
