= Itaim River =

There are several rivers in Brazil named Itaim River:

- Itaim River (Minas Gerais)
- Itaim River (Piauí)
- Itaim River (São Paulo)
