= Itapecerica River =

Location
- Country: Brazil

Physical characteristics
- Source
  - location: Minas Gerais state
- Mouth: Pará River
  - coordinates: 20°5′S 44°52′W

The Itapecerica River is a river of Minas Gerais state in southeastern Brazil.

== See also ==
- List of rivers of Minas Gerais
