= Do Sono River =

There are two rivers named Do Sono River or Rio do Sono Brazil:

- Do Sono River (Minas Gerais)
- Do Sono River (Tocantins)
