= Do Peixe River (Cabo Verde River tributary) =

Location
- Country: Brazil

Physical characteristics
- Source
  - location: Minas Gerais state
- Mouth: Cabo Verde River
  - coordinates: 21°34′S 46°19′W

The Do Peixe River is a river of Minas Gerais state in southeastern Brazil. It is a tributary of the Cabo Verde River.

== See also ==
- List of rivers of Minas Gerais
