= Araguari River =

Araguari River may refer to:

- Araguari River (Amapá), Brazil
- Araguari River (Minas Gerais), also called Rio das Velhas, Brazil
