= Dos Arantes River =

Location
- Country: Brazil

Physical characteristics
- Source
  - location: Minas Gerais state
- Mouth: São Domingos River
  - coordinates: 19°17′S 50°31′W

The Dos Arantes River is a river of Minas Gerais state in southeastern Brazil.

== See also ==
- List of rivers of Minas Gerais
