= Lambari =

Lambari may refer to:

== Places ==
- Lambari, Minas Gerais, a municipality in Brazil
- Lambari River (Pará River tributary), a river in southeastern Brazil
- Lambari River (Verde River tributary), a river in southeastern Brazil

== Species common names ==
- Lambari, a common name for Tradescantia zebrina
- Lambari, Portuguese common name for various characiform fish

== Other uses ==
- A clan of the Bharwad, people of India

== See also ==
- Lambari d'Oeste
