= Santa Catarina River =

Santa Catarina River may refer to:

- Santa Catarina River (Minas Gerais), Brazil
- Santa Catarina River (Rio de Janeiro), Brazil
- Santa Catarina River (Mexico), in Monterrey, Nuevo León, Mexico
