= Pirapetinga River =

Location
- Country: Brazil

Physical characteristics
- Source
  - location: Minas Gerais state
- Mouth: Paraíba do Sul
  - coordinates: 21°43′S 42°16′W

The Pirapetinga River is a river of Rio de Janeiro and Minas Gerais states in southeastern Brazil.

== See also ==
- List of rivers of Minas Gerais
