= Marmelada River =

Coordinates: 19°01′18″S 45°06′52″W

Location
- Country: Brazil

Physical characteristics
- Source
  - location: Minas Gerais state

The Marmelada River is a river of Minas Gerais state in southeastern Brazil.

== See also ==
- List of rivers of Minas Gerais
