= Capivari River (Minas Gerais) =

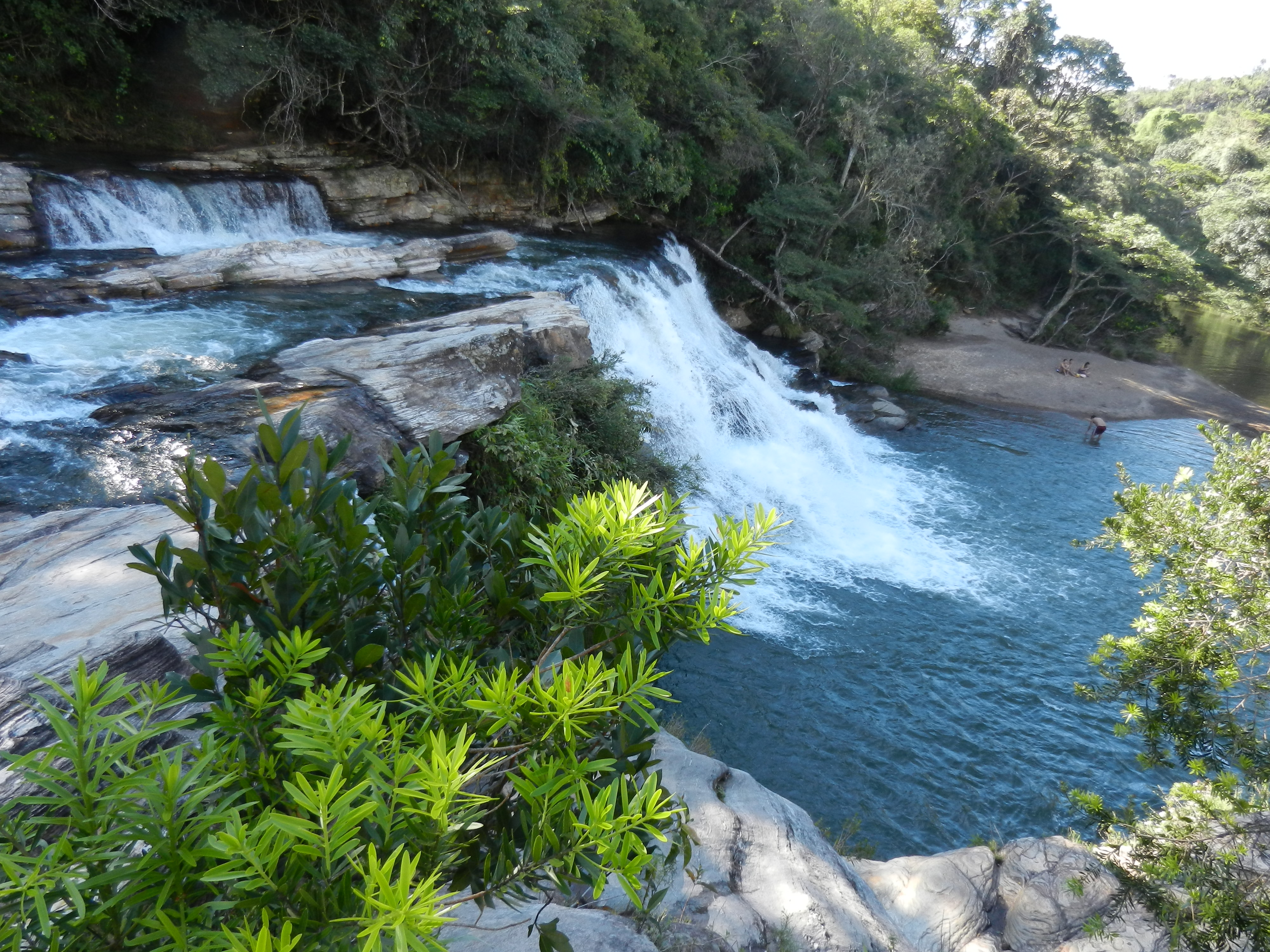
- Capivari River near Carrancas

Location
- Country: Brazil

Physical characteristics
- Source
  - location: Minas Gerais state
- Mouth: Ingaí River
  - coordinates: 21°21′S 44°53′W

The Capivari River is a Brazilian river in the state of Minas Gerais. Its source in the Serra da Chapada das Perdizes is located in Carrancas. The river has dozens of waterfalls along its course to its discharge into the Grande River. It passes through the municipalities of Itumirim and Lavras.

== See also ==
- List of rivers of Minas Gerais
