= Pampã River =

- Location within Brazil

Location
- Country: Brazil

Physical characteristics
- Source
  - location: Minas Gerais state
- Mouth: Mucuri River
  - coordinates: 17°42′S 40°37′W

The Pampã River is a river of Minas Gerais state in southeastern Brazil.

== See also ==
- List of rivers of Minas Gerais
