= Poço Triste River =

Location
- Country: Brazil

Physical characteristics
- Source
  - location: Minas Gerais state
- Mouth: Verde Pequeno River
  - coordinates: 14°46′S 43°29′W

The Poço Triste River is a river of Minas Gerais state in southeastern Brazil.

== See also ==
- List of rivers of Brazil
- List of rivers of Minas Gerais
