= Muzambo River =

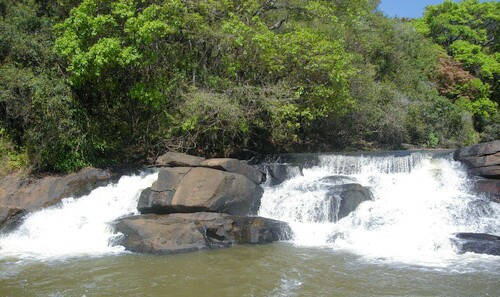
- Muzambo River in Divisa Nova

Location
- Country: Brazil

Physical characteristics
- Source
  - location: Minas Gerais state
- Mouth: Sapucaí River
  - coordinates: 21°19′S 46°0′W

The Muzambo River is a river of Minas Gerais state in southeastern Brazil.

== See also ==
- List of rivers of Minas Gerais
