= Pardo River (Das Velhas River tributary) =

Location
- Country: Brazil

Physical characteristics
- Source
  - location: Minas Gerais state
- Mouth: Das Velhas River
  - coordinates: 18°14′S 44°17′W

The Pardo River is a river of Minas Gerais state in southeastern Brazil. It is a tributary of the Das Velhas River.

== See also ==
- List of rivers of Minas Gerais
