= Manso River (Minas Gerais) =

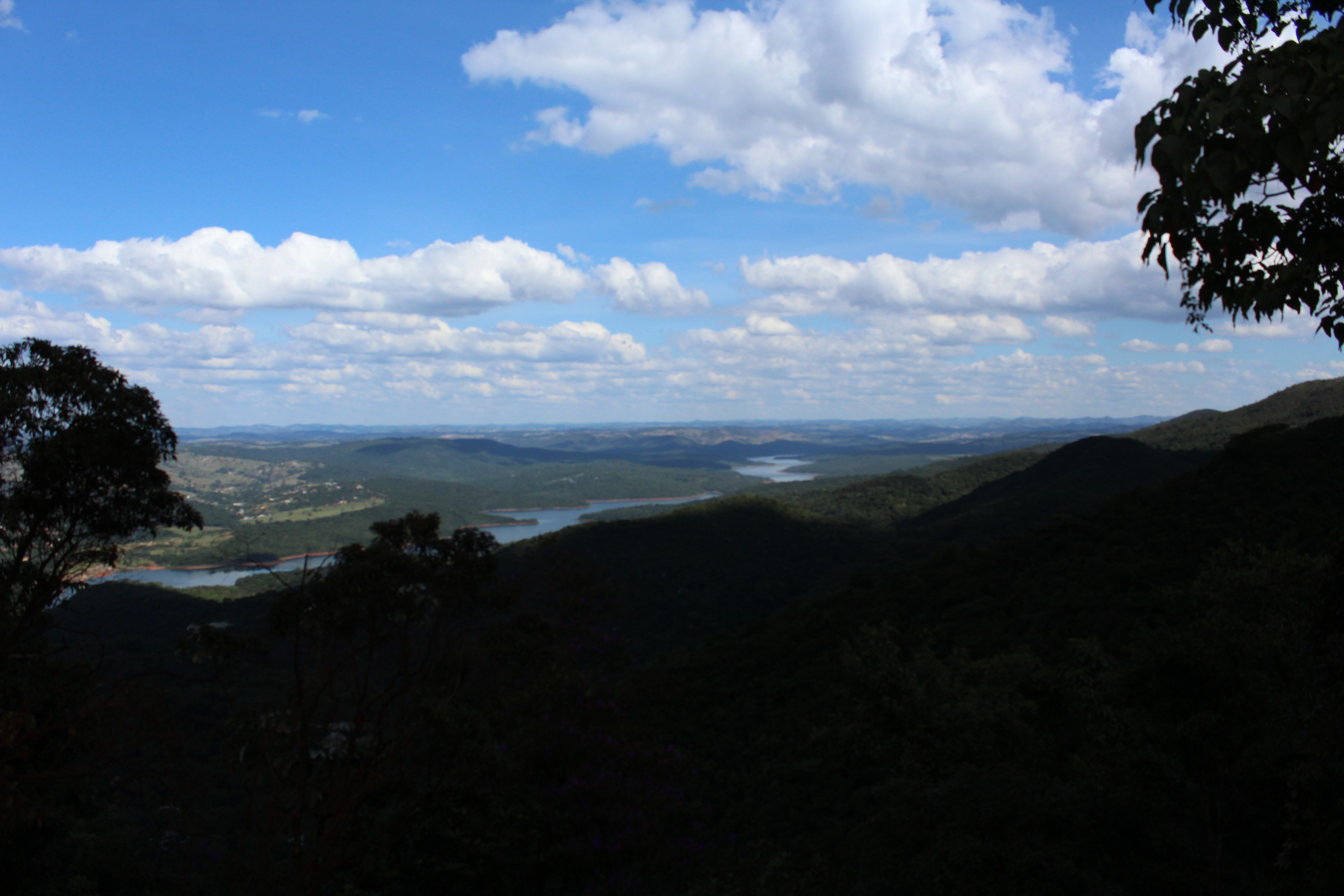

Location
- Country: Brazil

Physical characteristics
- Source
  - location: Minas Gerais state
- Mouth: Paraopeba River
  - coordinates: 20°8′S 44°13′W

The Manso River is a river in Minas Gerais state in southeastern Brazil, located southeast of Belo Horizonte, the state capital. The Manso River also runs through the countries of Argentina and Chile where whitewater rafting is a popular recreation.

== See also ==
- List of rivers of Minas Gerais
- List of rivers of Argentina
- List of rivers of Chile
