= Elvas River =

Coordinates: 21°07′52″S 44°10′21″W

Location
- Country: Brazil

Physical characteristics
- Source
  - location: Minas Gerais state

The Elvas River is a river of Minas Gerais state in southeastern Brazil.

== See also ==
- List of rivers of Minas Gerais
