= Pacuí River (Gorutuba River tributary) =

Location
- Country: Brazil

Physical characteristics
- Source
  - location: Minas Gerais state
- Mouth: Gorutuba River
  - coordinates: 15°5′S 43°19′W

The Pacuí River is a river of Minas Gerais state in southeastern Brazil. It is a tributary of the Gorutuba River.

== See also ==
- List of rivers of Minas Gerais
