= Cipó River =

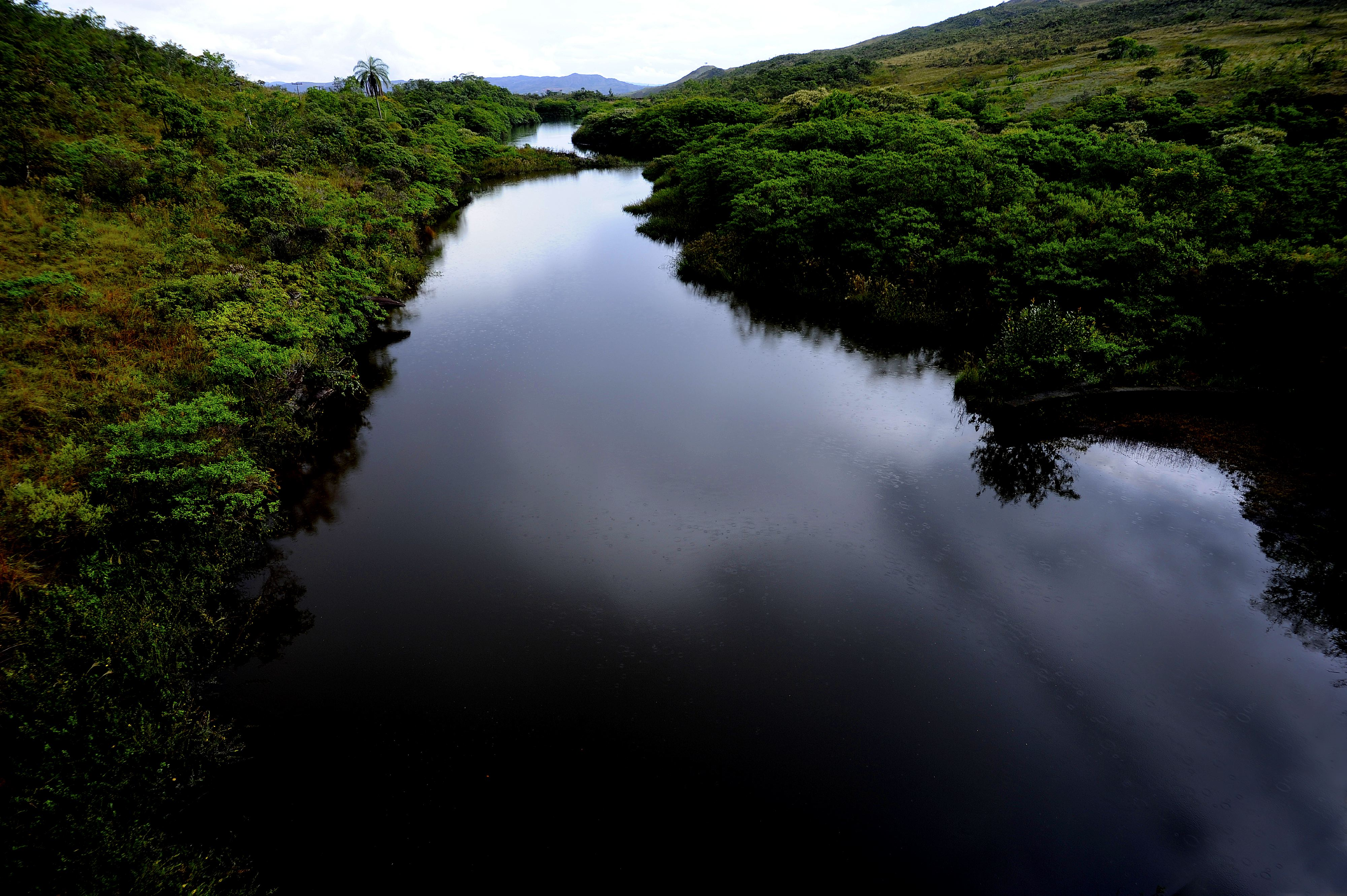

Location
- Country: Brazil

Physical characteristics
- Source
  - location: Minas Gerais state
- Mouth: Das Velhas River
  - coordinates: 18°31′S 44°11′W

The Cipó River is a river of Minas Gerais state in southeastern Brazil.

== See also ==
- List of rivers of Minas Gerais
