= Itacambiruçu River =

Coordinates: 16°43′25″S 42°36′28″W

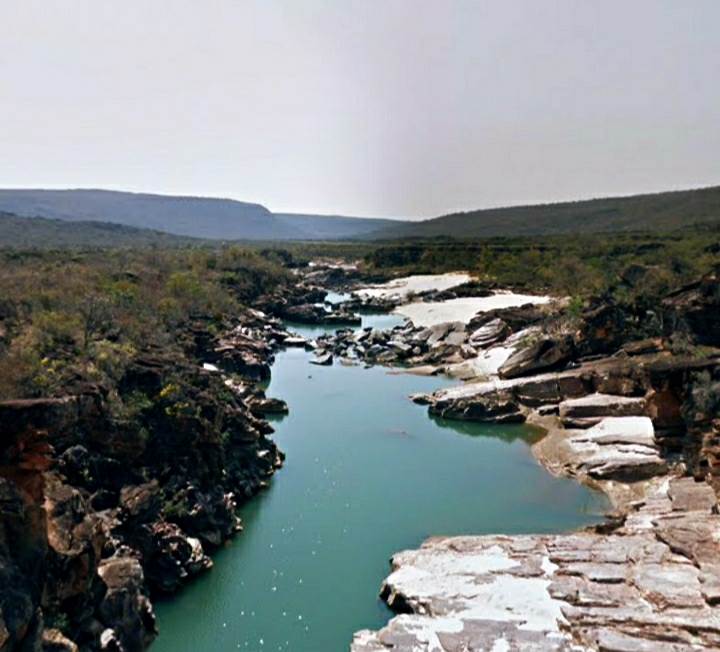
- Itacambiruçu River near Grão Mogol

Location
- Country: Brazil

Physical characteristics
- Source
  - location: Minas Gerais state

The Itacambiruçu River is a river of Minas Gerais state in southeastern Brazil.

== See also ==
- List of rivers of Minas Gerais
