= Quebra-Anzol River =

Coordinates: 19°10′S 47°39′W

Location
- Country: Brazil

Physical characteristics
- Source
  - location: Minas Gerais state

The Quebra-Anzol River is a river of Minas Gerais state in southeastern Brazil.

== See also ==
- List of rivers of Minas Gerais
