= Manhuaçu River =

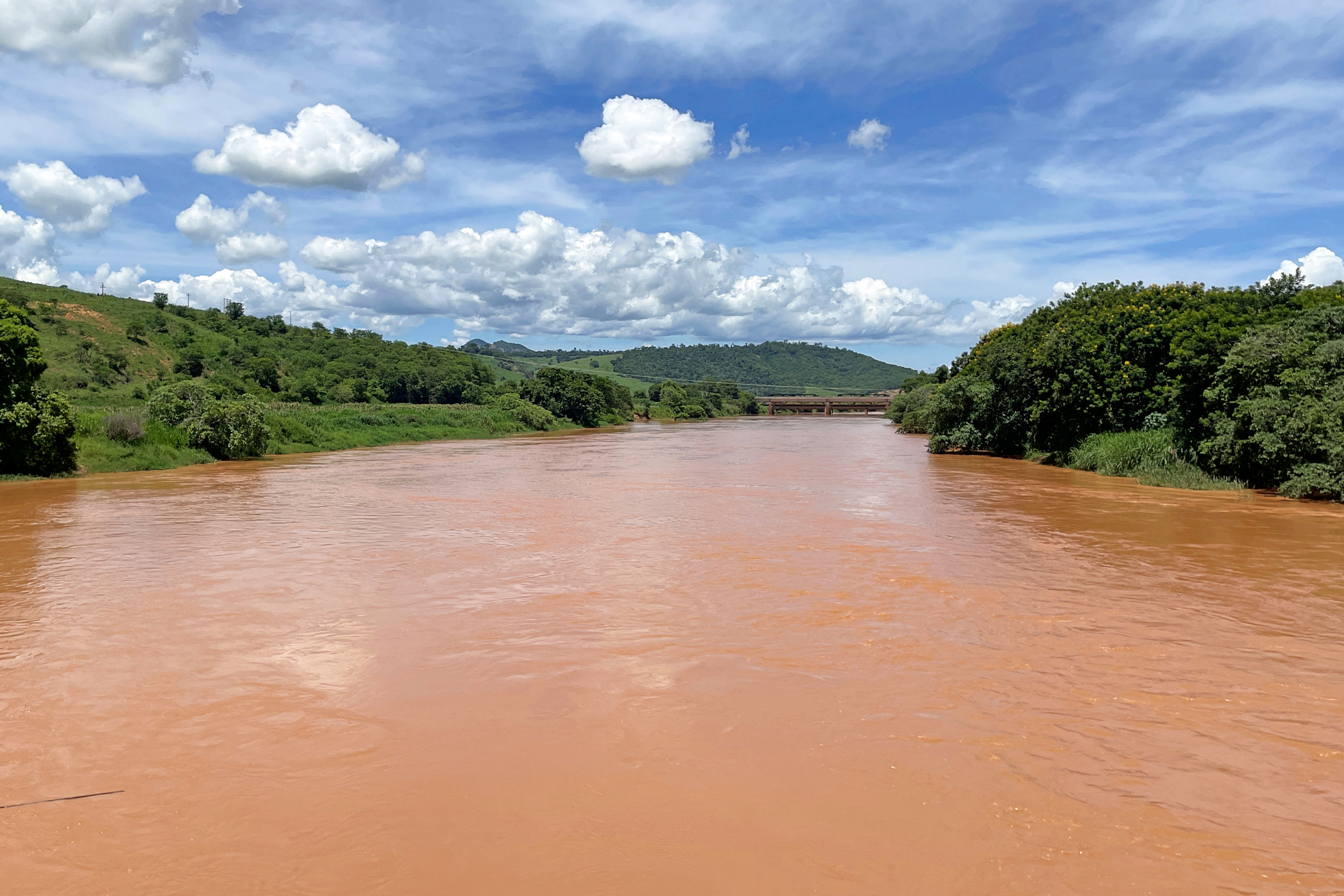

- Manhuaçu River (Brazil)

Location
- Country: Brazil

Physical characteristics
- Mouth
  - location: Minas Gerais, Brazil
  - coordinates: 19.485682°S 41.088830°W

Basin features
- River system: Doce River

The Manhuaçu River is a river of Minas Gerais state in southeastern Brazil.

The river is in the Doce River basin. It runs past the Feliciano Miguel Abdala Private Natural Heritage Reserve, located on its left bank, home to one of the last wild populations of northern muriqui woolly spider monkeys.

== See also ==
- List of rivers of Minas Gerais

== Sources ==
- Map from Ministry of Transport
- Rand McNally, The New International Atlas, 1993.
