= Uberabinha River =

Coordinates: 18°35′52″S 48°31′47″W

Location
- Country: Brazil

Physical characteristics
- Source
  - location: Minas Gerais state

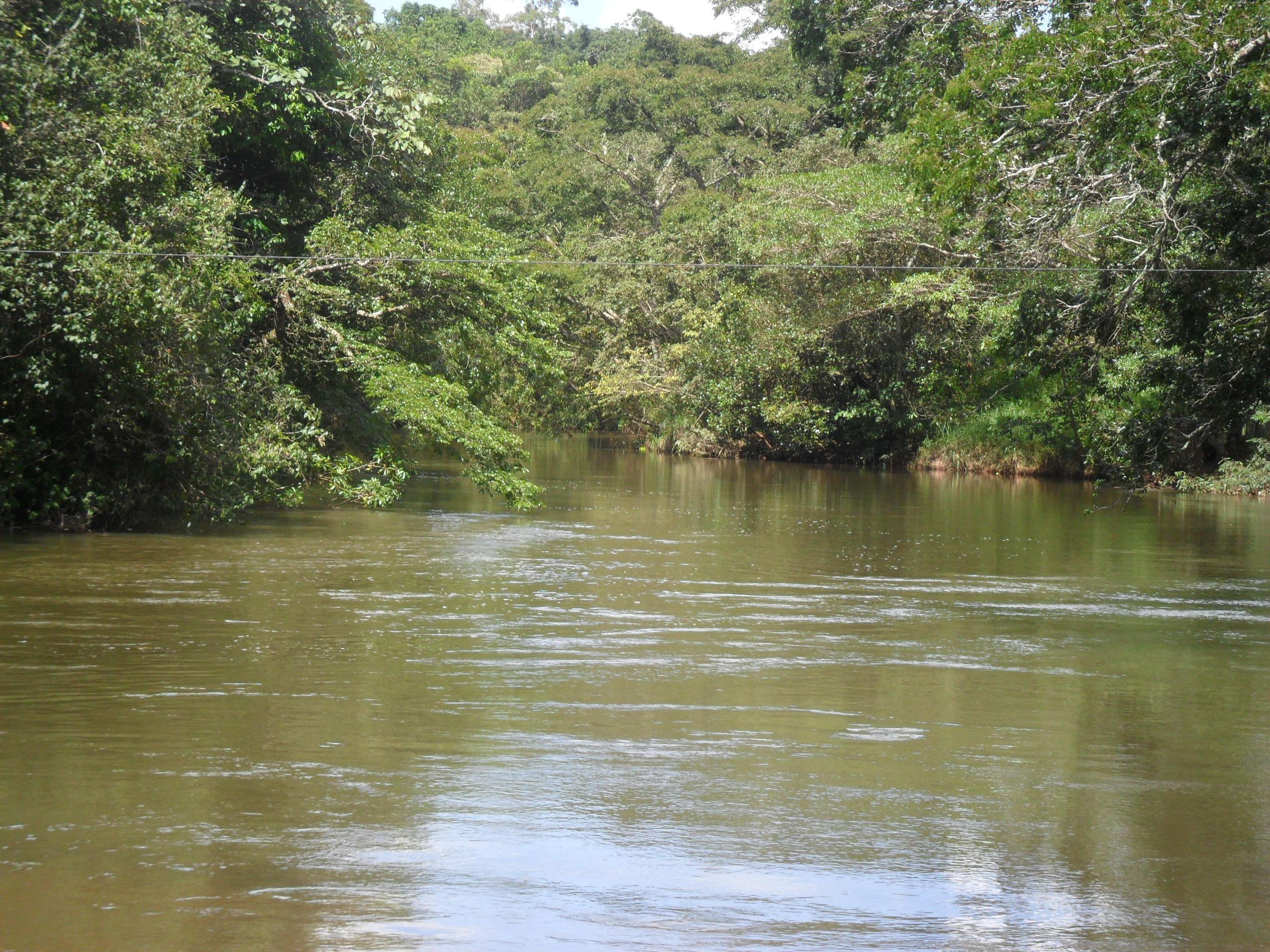
Uberabinha River

The Uberabinha River is a river of Minas Gerais state in southeastern Brazil.

== See also ==
- List of rivers of Minas Gerais
