= Mainart River =

Coordinates: 20°27′S 43°17′W

Location
- Country: Brazil

Physical characteristics
- Source
  - location: Minas Gerais state

The Mainart River is a river of Minas Gerais state in southeastern Brazil.

== See also ==
- List of rivers of Minas Gerais
