= Urupaça River =

Location
- Country: Brazil

Physical characteristics
- Source
  - location: Minas Gerais state
- Mouth: Suaçuí Grande River
  - coordinates: 18°25′S 42°3′W

The Urupaça River is a river of Minas Gerais state in southeastern Brazil.
