= Sapucaí-Mirim River =

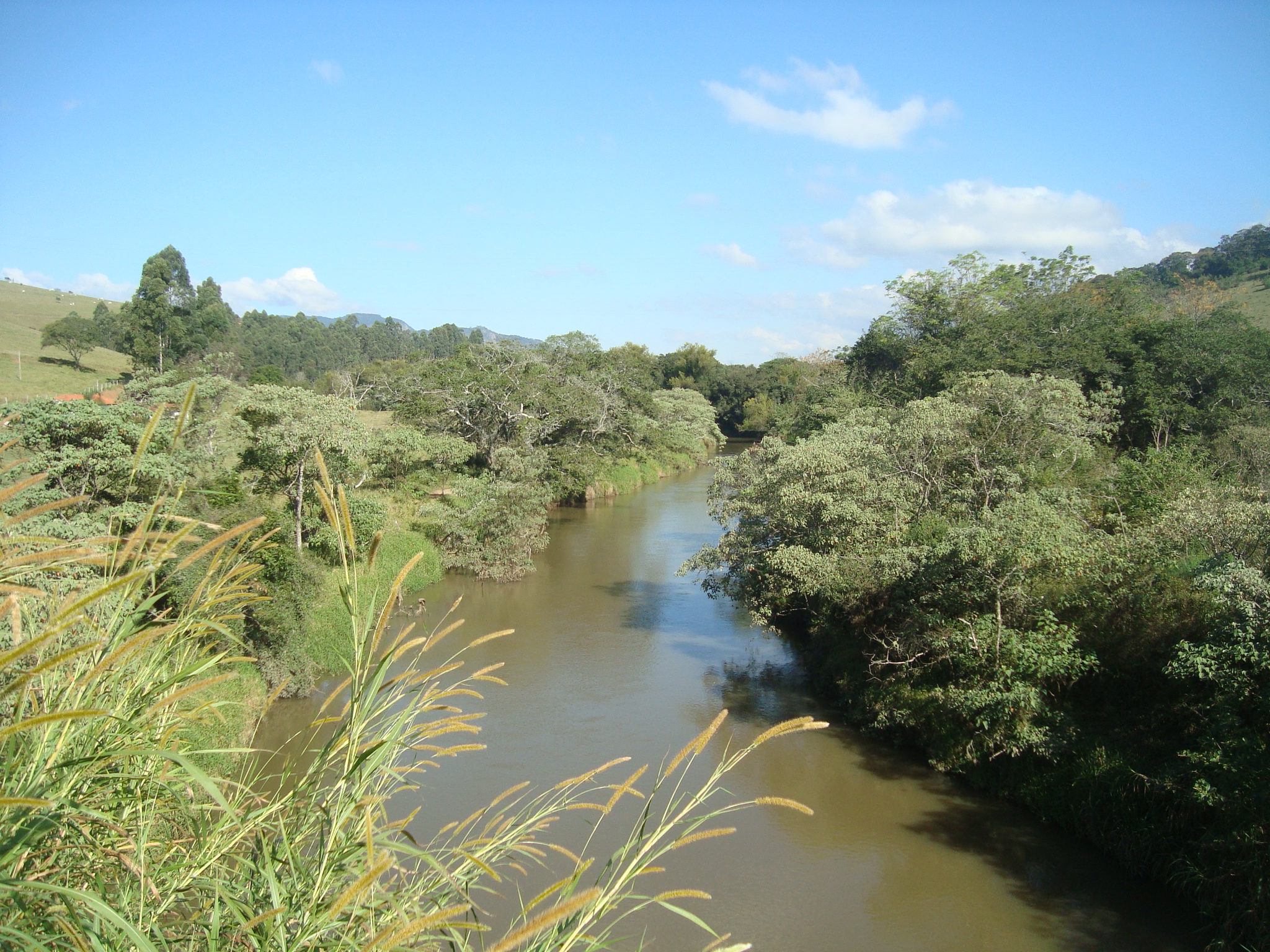
- Sapucaí-Mirim River in Paraisópolis, near highway MG-295

Location
- Country: Brazil

Physical characteristics
- Source
  - location: Mantiqueira Mountains
  - elevation: 1,950 m (6,400 ft)
- Mouth
  - location: Sapucaí
  - coordinates: 22.1992°S 45.8762°W
  - elevation: 800 m (2,600 ft)
- Length: 150 km (93 mi)

The Sapucaí-Mirim River is a river that flows through the Brazilian states of São Paulo and Minas Gerais. Its source lies within the Mantiqueira Mountains and it discharges into the Sapucaí River.

== Course ==
The headwaters of the river are protected by the 39,800 hectares (98,000 acres) Sapucaí Mirim Environmental Protection Area, created in 1998. The 180,373 hectares (445,710 acres) Fernão Dias Environmental Protection Area, created in 1997, also protects some of the headwaters. In the state of São Paulo, the river passes by the municipalities of Santo Antônio do Pinhal and São Bento do Sapucaí. In the state of Minas Gerais, it passes by the municipalities of Sapucaí-Mirim, Gonçalves, Paraisópolis, Conceição dos Ouros, Cachoeira de Minas and Pouso Alegre.

== Tributaries ==
Its main tributaries are the Capivari River, Itaim River, Mandu River and the Ribeirão dos Ouros.

== See also ==
- List of rivers of Minas Gerais
- List of rivers of São Paulo
