= Rubim do Sul River =

Coordinates: 16°07′06″S 40°24′57″W

Location
- Country: Brazil

Physical characteristics
- Source
  - location: Minas Gerais state

The Rubim do Sul River is a river of Minas Gerais state in southeastern Brazil.

== See also ==
- List of rivers of Minas Gerais
