= Tabatinga River =

Coordinates: 17°24′S 43°18′W

Location
- Country: Brazil

Physical characteristics
- Source
  - location: Minas Gerais state

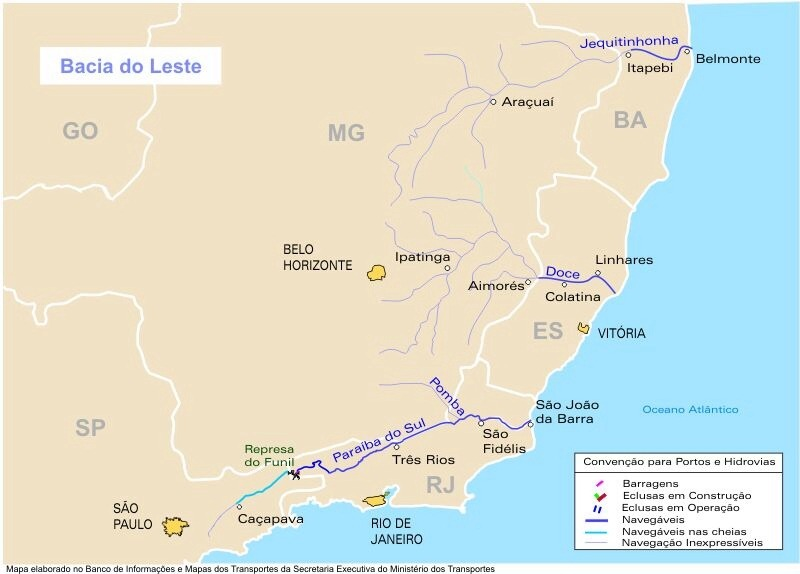
Map of the eastern river basins of Brazil featuring Minas Gerais

The Tabatinga River is a river of Minas Gerais state in southeastern Brazil.

== See also ==
- List of rivers of Minas Gerais
