= Curimataí River =

Location
- Country: Brazil

Physical characteristics
- Source
  - location: Minas Gerais state
- Mouth: Das Velhas River
  - coordinates: 18°11′S 44°23′W

The Curimataí River is a river of Minas Gerais state in southeastern Brazil.

== See also ==
- List of rivers of Minas Gerais
