= Setúbal River =

Coordinates: 16.8893°S 42.1597°W

Location
- Country: Brazil

Physical characteristics
- Source
  - location: Minas Gerais state

The Setúbal River is a river of Minas Gerais state in southeastern Brazil.

== See also ==
- List of rivers of Minas Gerais
