= Itamarandiba River =

Coordinates: 17°18′23″S 42°48′04″W

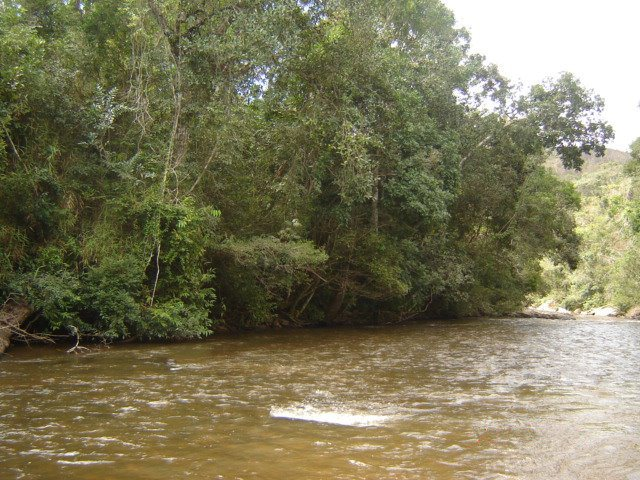

Location
- Country: Brazil

Physical characteristics
- Source
  - location: Minas Gerais state

The Itamarandiba River is a river of Minas Gerais state in southeastern Brazil.

== See also ==
- List of rivers of Minas Gerais
