= Pandeiros River =

Coordinates: 15°42′01″S 44°35′02″W

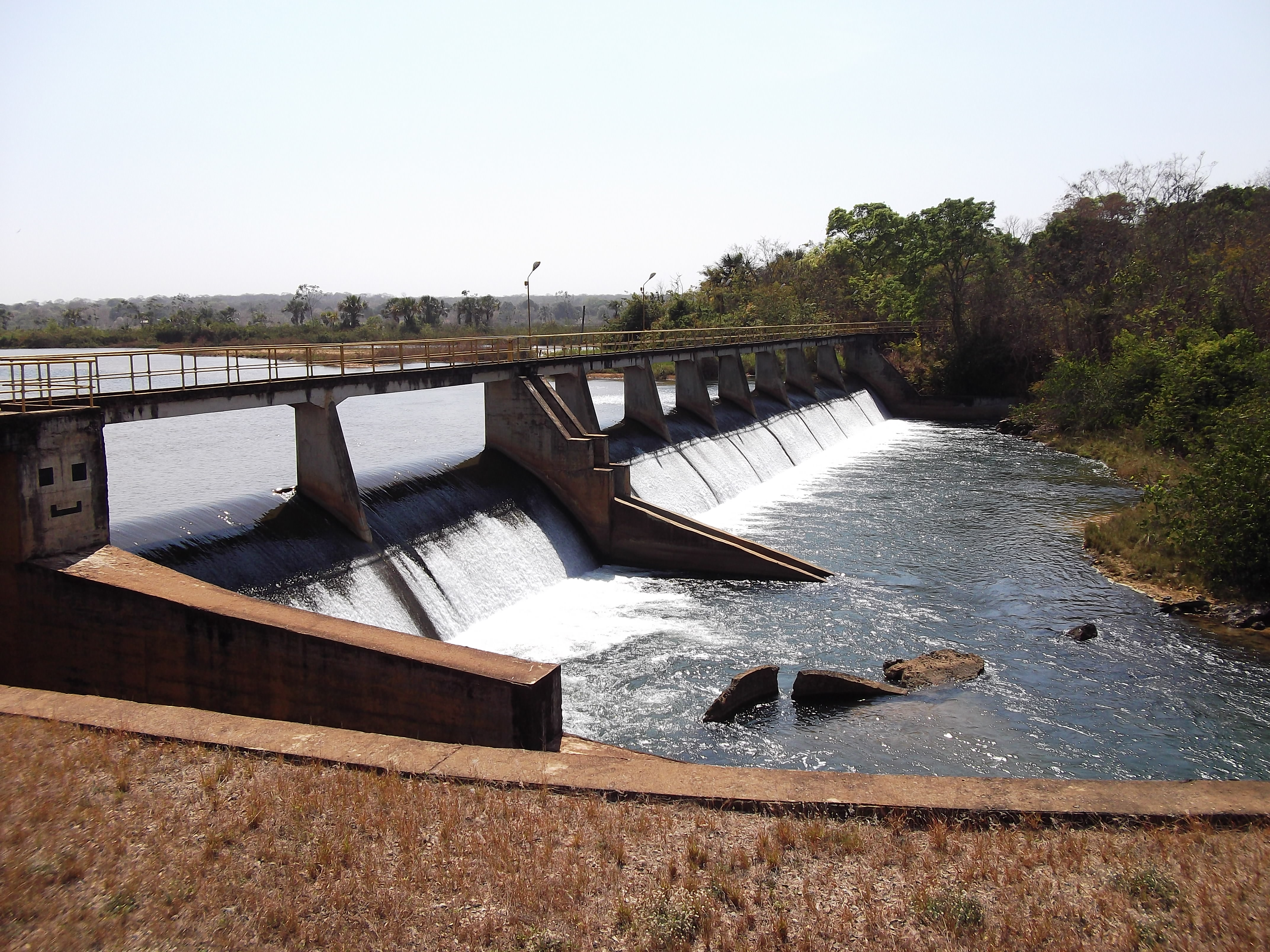
- Pandeiros River Power Plant Dam

Location
- Country: Brazil

Physical characteristics
- Source
  - location: Minas Gerais state

The Pandeiros River is a river of Minas Gerais state in southeastern Brazil.

== See also ==
- List of rivers of Minas Gerais
