= Rio das Mortes (Minas Gerais) =

River in Minas Gerais, Brazil

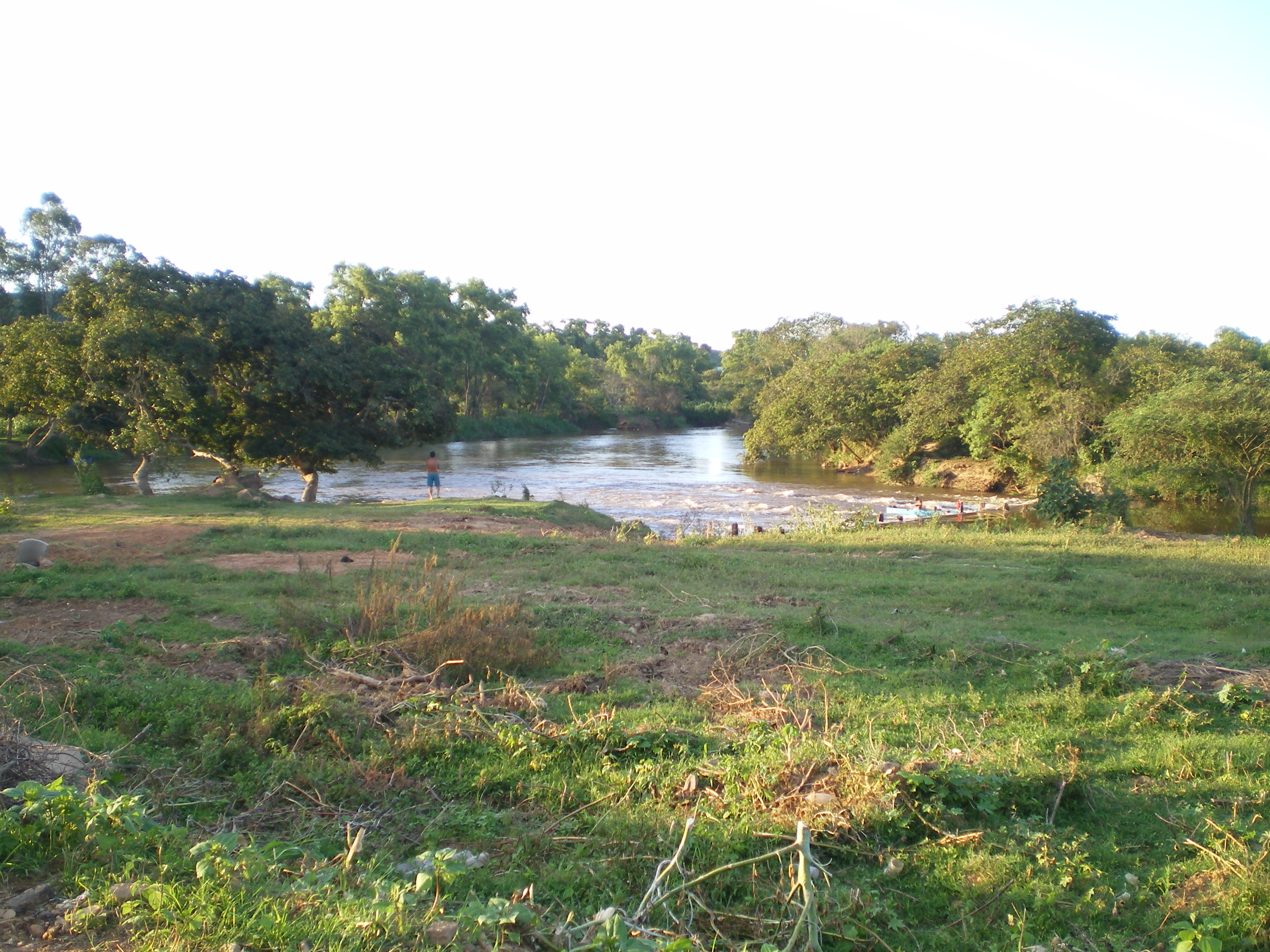
- Rio das Mortes in São João del-Rei

Location
- Country: Brazil

Physical characteristics
- Source
  - location: Minas Gerais state
- Mouth: Rio Grande
  - coordinates: 21°9′S 44°53′W

The Rio das Mortes is a river of Minas Gerais state in southeastern Brazil.

== See also ==
- List of rivers of Minas Gerais
