= Suaçuí Pequeno River =

Coordinates: 18°57′21″S 42°03′51″W

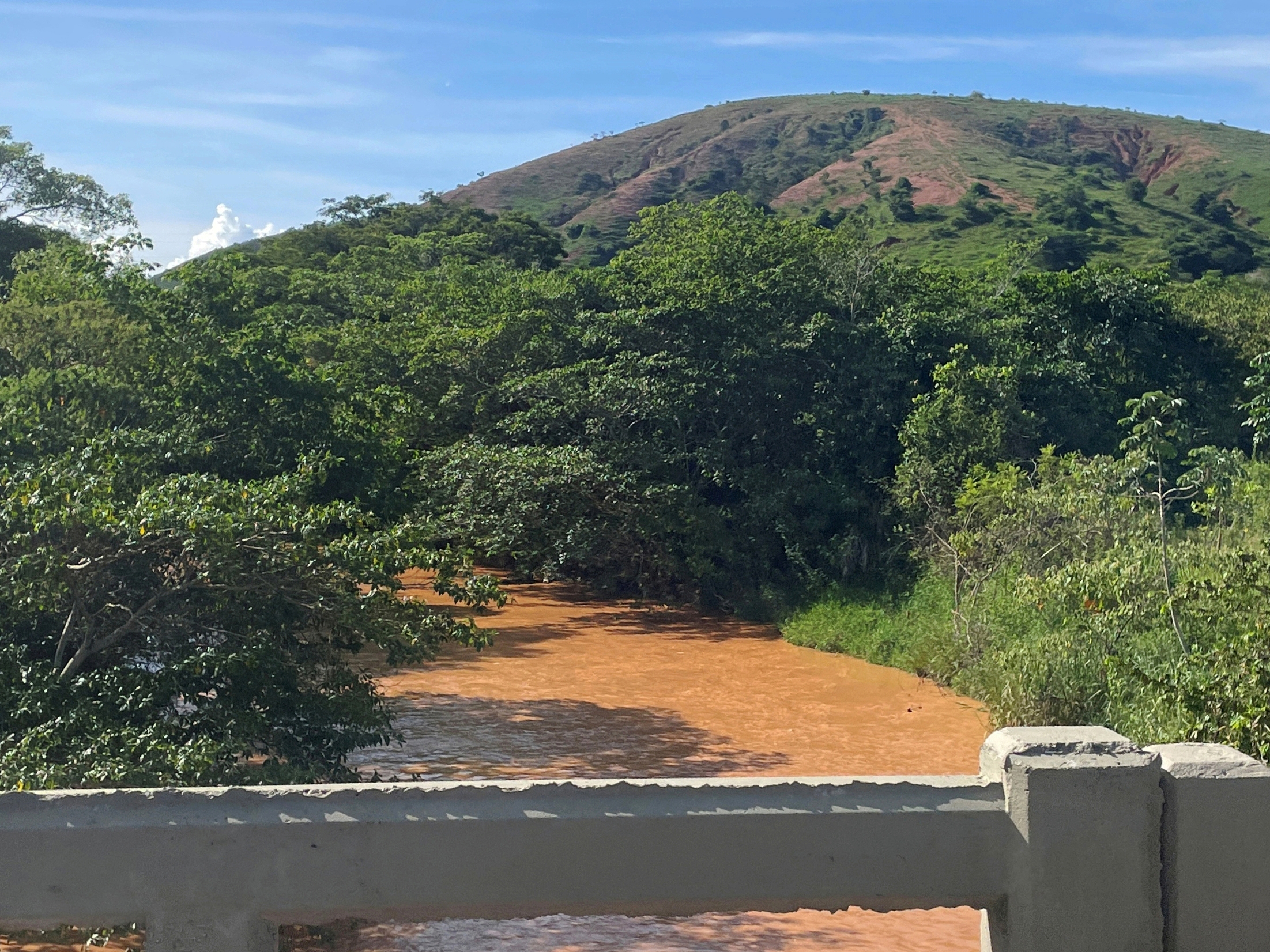

- Location within Brazil

Location
- Country: Brazil

Physical characteristics
- Source
  - location: Minas Gerais state

The Suaçuí Pequeno River is a river of Minas Gerais state in southeastern Brazil.

== See also ==
- List of rivers of Minas Gerais
