= Machado River (Minas Gerais) =

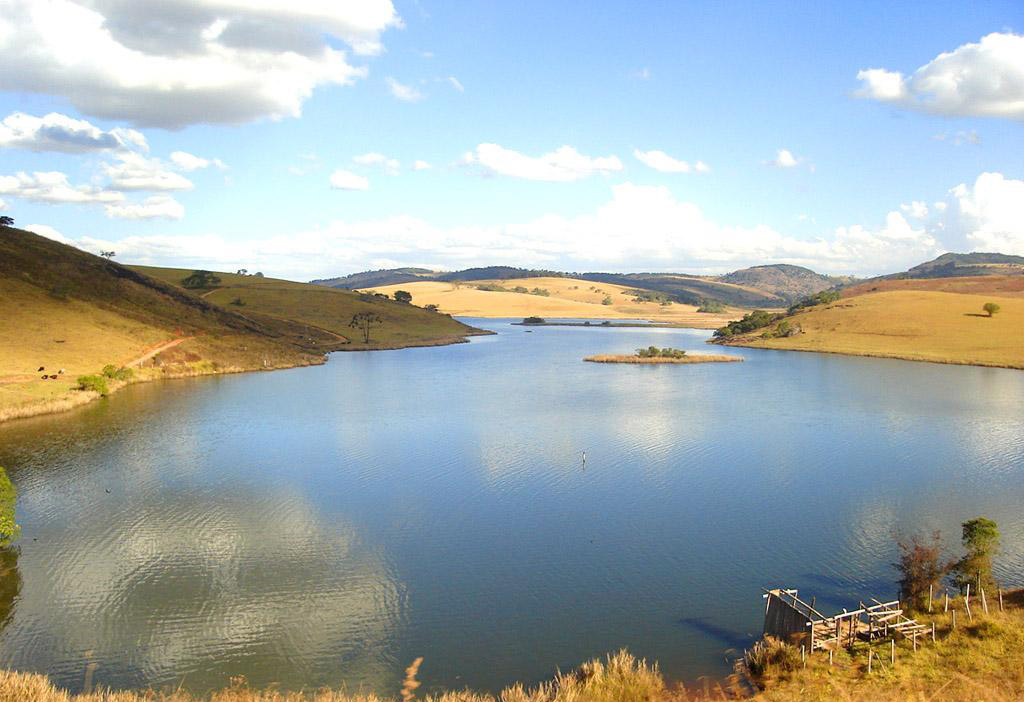

Location
- Country: Brazil

Physical characteristics
- Source
  - location: Minas Gerais state
- Mouth: Sapucaí River
  - coordinates: 21°24′S 45°49′W

The Machado River is a river of Minas Gerais state in southeastern Brazil.

== See also ==
- List of rivers of Minas Gerais
