= Salinas River (Minas Gerais) =

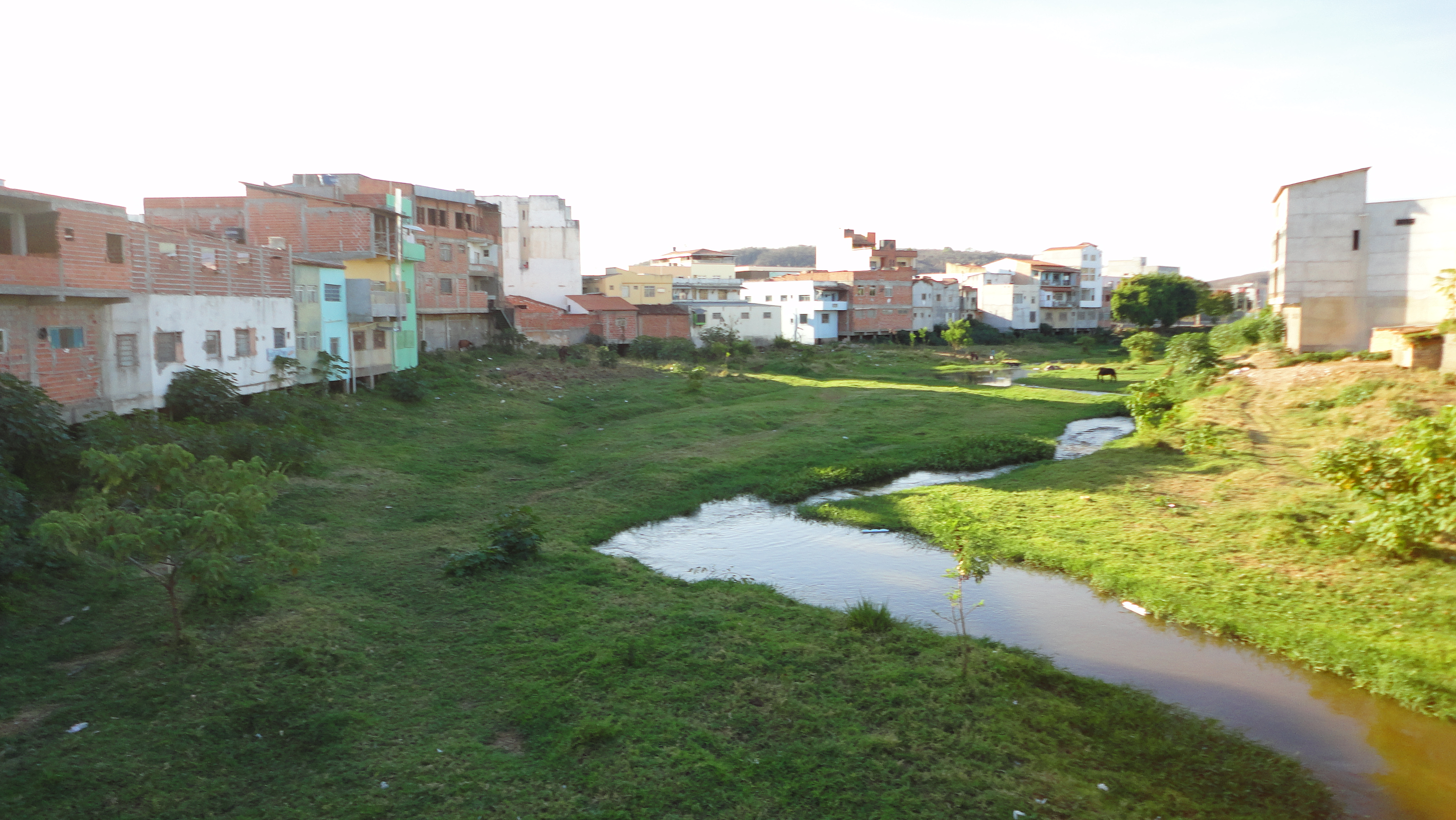
- Salinas River in downtown Salinas

Location
- Country: Brazil

Physical characteristics
- Source
  - location: Minas Gerais state
- Mouth: Jequitinhonha River
  - coordinates: 16°37′S 42°19′W

The Salinas River is a river of Minas Gerais state in southeastern Brazil. Not to be confused with the one in California.

== See also ==
- List of rivers of Minas Gerais
