= Rio Verde (Grande River tributary) =

Coordinates: 20.0214°S 47.4308°W

Location
- Country: Brazil

Physical characteristics
- Source
  - location: Minas Gerais state

Rio Verde (Portuguese for "green river") is a river of Minas Gerais state in southeastern Brazil.

== See also ==
- List of rivers of Minas Gerais
