= Borrachudo River =

Location
- Country: Brazil

Physical characteristics
- Source
  - location: Minas Gerais state
- Mouth: São Francisco River
  - coordinates: 18°14′S 45°19′W

The Borrachudo River is a river of Minas Gerais state in southeastern Brazil.

== See also ==
- List of rivers of Minas Gerais
