= São João do Paraíso River =

River in Minas Gerais, Brazil

Coordinates: 15°37′30″S 41°56′04″W

Location
- Country: Brazil

Physical characteristics
- Source
  - location: Minas Gerais state

The São João do Paraíso River is a river of Minas Gerais state in southeastern Brazil.

== See also ==
- List of rivers of Minas Gerais
