= São João River (Minas Gerais) =

River in Brazil

Location
- Country: Brazil
- State: Minas Gerais

Physical characteristics
- Source
  - location: Minas Gerais state
- Mouth: Grande River
  - coordinates: 20°27′00″S 46°50′00″W

The São João River is a tributary of the Grande River in Minas Gerais state, southeastern Brazil.

== See also ==
- List of rivers of Minas Gerais
