= Corrente River (Rio do Peixe tributary) =

Location
- Country: Brazil

Physical characteristics
- Source
  - location: Minas Gerais state
- Mouth: Rio do Peixe
  - coordinates: 22°36′S 46°25′W

The Corrente River is a river of Minas Gerais state in southeastern Brazil. It is a tributary of the Rio do Peixe.

== See also ==
- List of rivers of Minas Gerais
