= Santana River (Minas Gerais) =

Location
- Country: Brazil

Physical characteristics
- Source
  - location: Minas Gerais state
- Mouth: Rio Grande
  - coordinates: 20°42′S 45°39′W

The Santana River is a river of Minas Gerais state in southeastern Brazil.

== See also ==
- List of rivers of Minas Gerais
