= Itinga River =

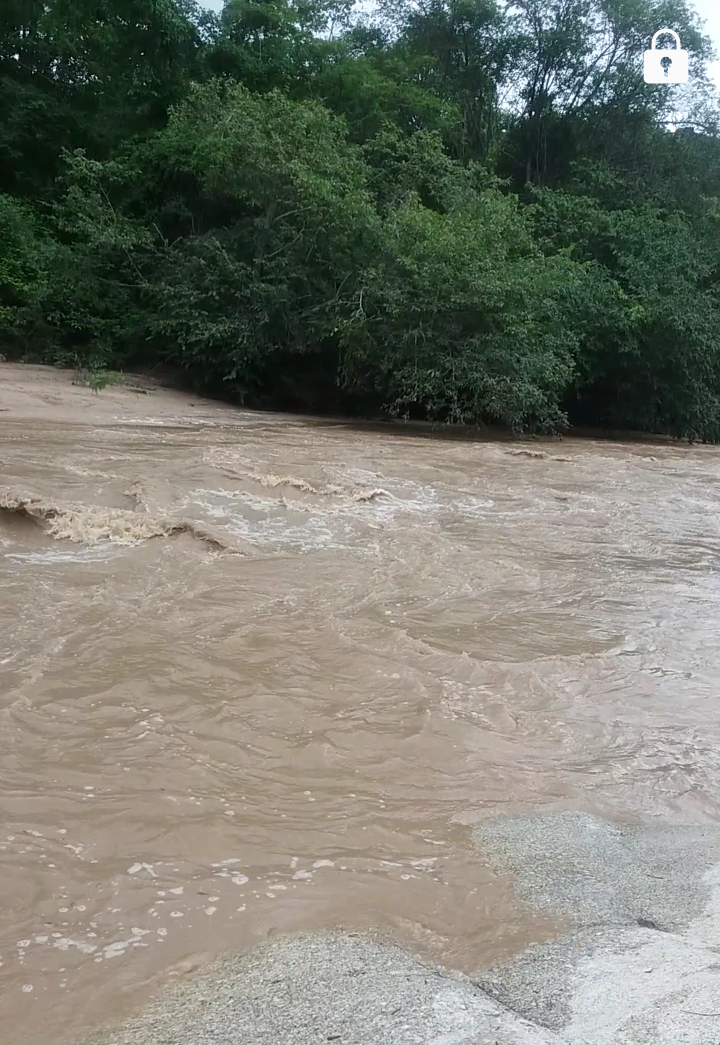
- Itinga River near Santa Cruz de Salinas

Location
- Country: Brazil

Physical characteristics
- Source
  - location: Minas Gerais state
- Mouth: Jequitinhonha River
  - coordinates: 16°35′S 41°45′W

The Itinga River is a river in the state of Minas Gerais, located in southeastern Brazil.

== See also ==
- List of rivers of Minas Gerais
