= Itambacurí River =

Coordinates: 18°39′44″S 41°47′43″W

- Location within Brazil

Location
- Country: Brazil

Physical characteristics
- Source
  - location: Minas Gerais state

The Itambacurí River is a river of Minas Gerais state in southeastern Brazil.

== See also ==
- List of rivers of Minas Gerais
