= Bicudo River =

Location
- Country: Brazil

Physical characteristics
- Source
  - location: Minas Gerais state
- Mouth: Das Velhas River
  - coordinates: 18°4′S 44°31′W

The Bicudo River is a river in Minas Gerais state in southeastern Brazil.

== See also ==
- List of rivers of Minas Gerais
