= Itacarambi River =

Coordinates: 14°58′06″S 43°59′24″W

Location
- Country: Brazil

Physical characteristics
- Source
  - location: Minas Gerais state

The Itacarambi River is a river located in the Minas Gerais state in southeastern Brazil.

== See also ==
- List of rivers of Minas Gerais

== Sources ==
- Map from Ministry of Transport
- Rand McNally, The New International Atlas, 1993.
