= Da Prata River (Tijuco River tributary) =

Location
- Country: Brazil

Physical characteristics
- Source
  - location: Minas Gerais state
- Mouth: Tijuco River
  - coordinates: 18°49′S 49°52′W

The Da Prata River is a river of Minas Gerais state in southeastern Brazil. It is a tributary of the Tijuco River.

== See also ==
- List of rivers of Minas Gerais
