= São Miguel River (Minas Gerais) =

Location
- Country: Brazil

Physical characteristics
- Source
  - location: Minas Gerais state
- Mouth: Jequitinhonha River
  - coordinates: 16°26′11″S 40°59′44″W

The São Miguel River is a river of Minas Gerais state in southeastern Brazil.

== See also ==
- List of rivers of Minas Gerais
