= Cabo Verde River =

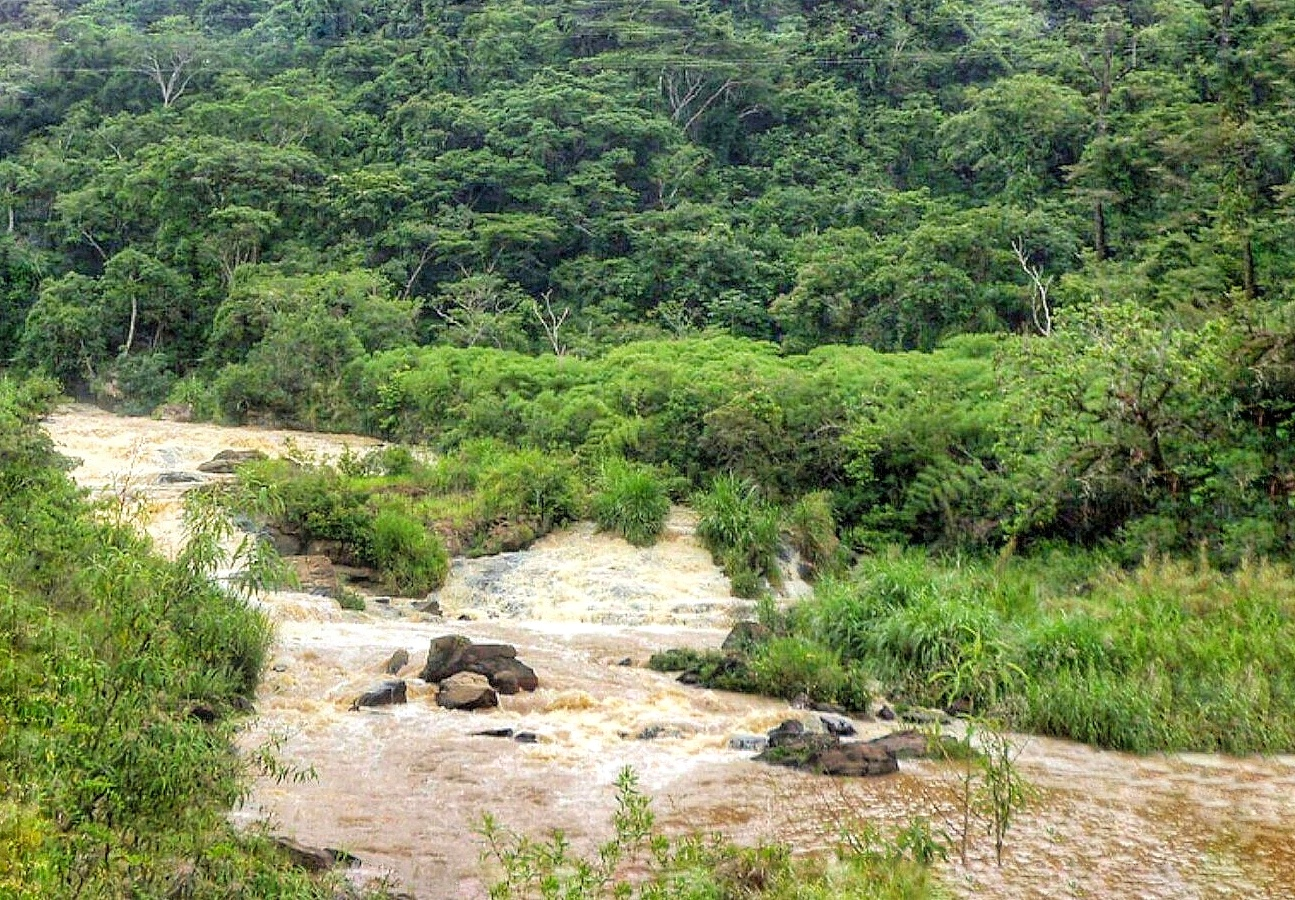

Location
- Country: Brazil

Physical characteristics
- Source
  - location: Minas Gerais state
- Mouth: Sapucaí River
  - coordinates: 21°15′S 45°57′W

The Cabo Verde River is a river of Minas Gerais state in southeastern Brazil.

== See also ==
- List of rivers of Minas Gerais
