= Urucuia River =

Coordinates: 16°07′27″S 45°04′56″W

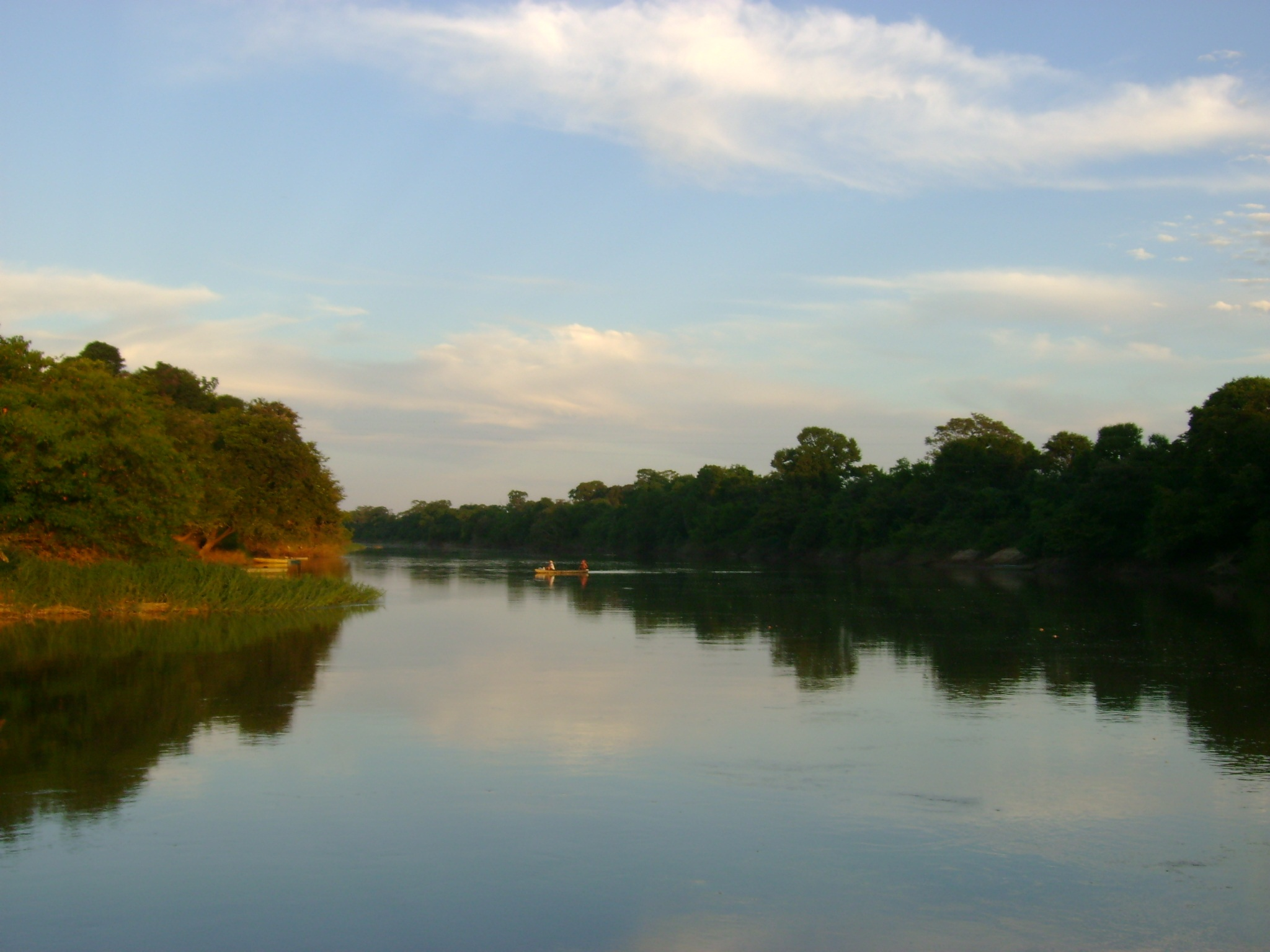

Location
- Country: Brazil

Physical characteristics
- Source
  - location: Minas Gerais state

The Urucuia River is a river of Minas Gerais state in southeastern Brazil.

== See also ==
- List of rivers of Minas Gerais
