= Da Prata River (Paracatu River tributary) =

Location
- Country: Brazil

Physical characteristics
- Source
  - location: Minas Gerais state
- Mouth: Paracatu River
  - coordinates: 17°29′S 46°33′W

The Da Prata River is a river in Minas Gerais, Brazil. It is a tributary of the Paracatu River.

== See also ==
- List of rivers of Minas Gerais
