= Escuro River (Minas Gerais) =

River in southeast Brazil

Location
- Country: Brazil

Physical characteristics
- Source
  - location: Minas Gerais state
- Mouth: Paracatu River
  - coordinates: 16°17′S 45°13′W

The Escuro River is a river in the Minas Gerais state in southeastern Brazil.

== See also ==
- List of rivers of Minas Gerais
