= Suaçuí Grande River =

Coordinates: 18°39′46″S 41°47′44″W

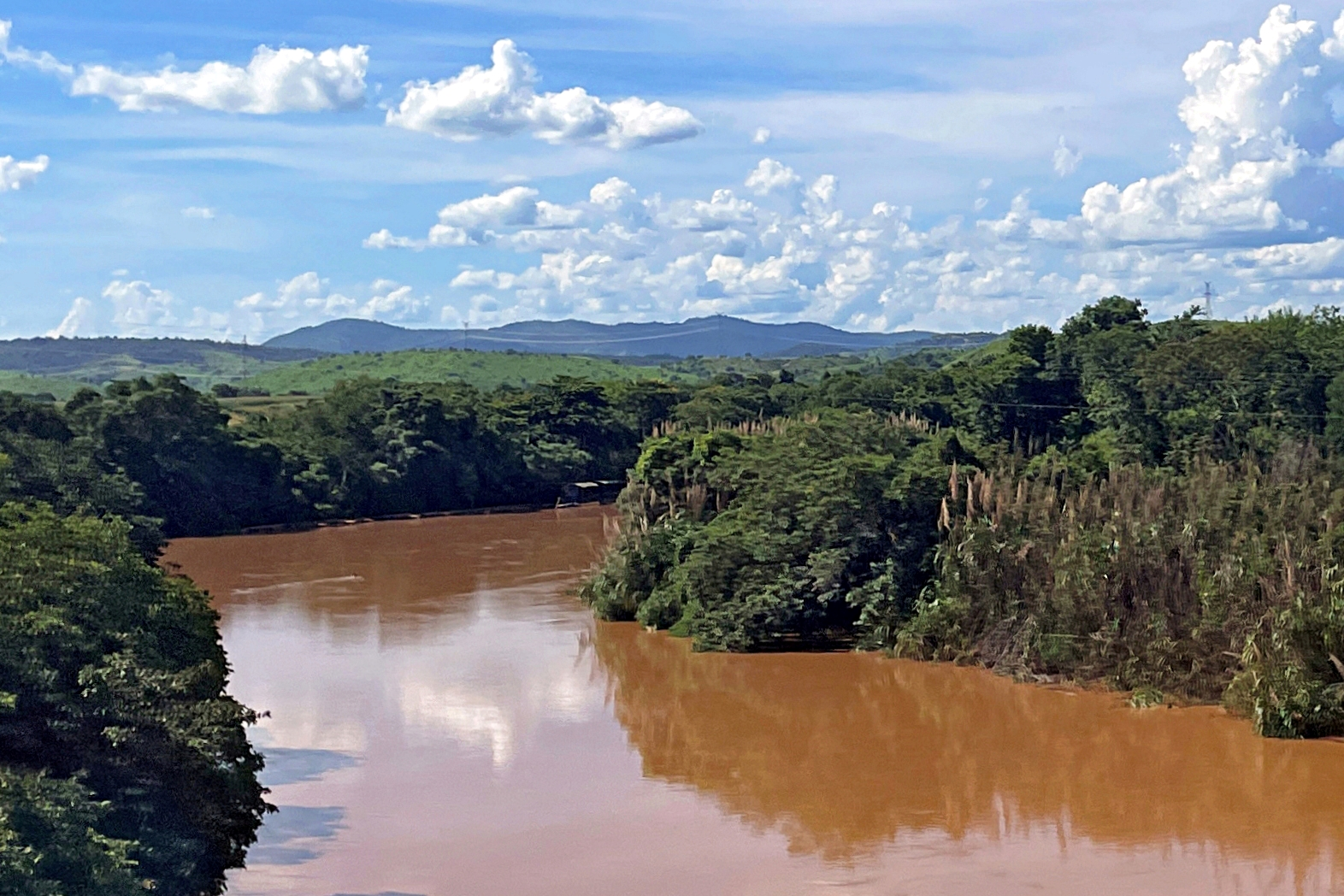

- Location within Brazil

Location
- Country: Brazil

Physical characteristics
- Source
  - location: Minas Gerais state

The Suaçuí Grande River is a river of Minas Gerais state in southeastern Brazil.

== See also ==
- List of rivers of Minas Gerais
