= Paracatu River (Brasília de Minas) =

Location
- Country: Brazil

Physical characteristics
- Source
  - location: Minas Gerais state
- Mouth: São Francisco River
  - coordinates: 16°28′S 45°4′W

The Paracatu River is a river of Minas Gerais state in southeastern Brazil. It joins the São Francisco River just 12 km north of the mouth of its much larger namesake the Paracatu River on the opposite bank.

== See also ==
- List of rivers of Minas Gerais
