= Lambari River (Verde River tributary) =

Location
- Country: Brazil

Physical characteristics
- Source
  - location: Minas Gerais state
- Mouth: Rio Verde
  - coordinates: 21°46′S 45°13′W

The Lambari River is a river of Minas Gerais state in southeastern Brazil. It is a tributary of the Rio Verde.

== See also ==
- List of rivers of Minas Gerais
