= Do Carmo River (Minas Gerais) =

Location
- Country: Brazil

Physical characteristics
- Source
  - location: Minas Gerais state
- Mouth: Doce River
  - coordinates: 20°17′S 42°55′W

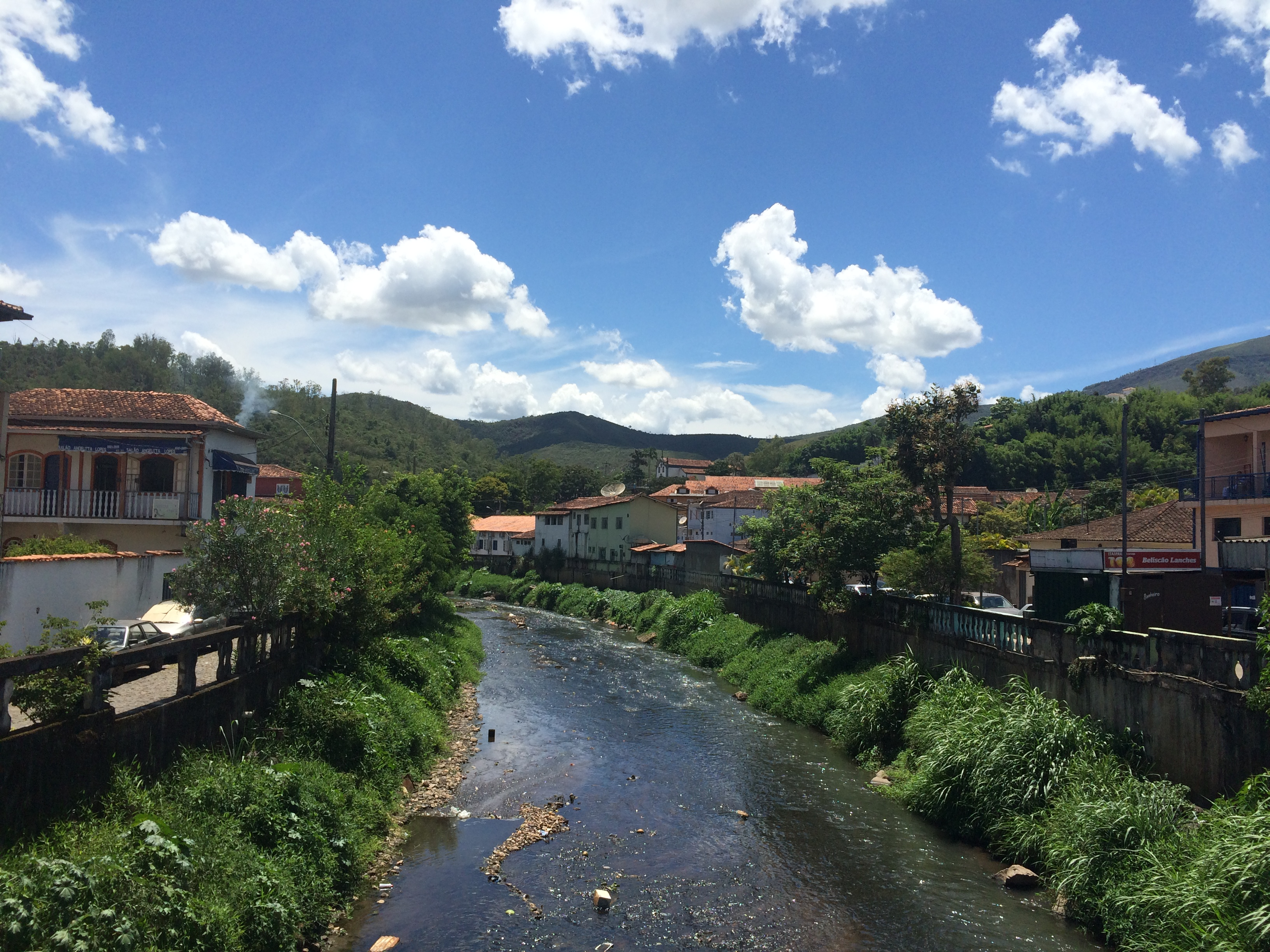
Do Carmo River, Mariana, Minas Gerais

The Do Carmo River is a river of Minas Gerais state in southeastern Brazil. It merges with the Piranga River to form the Doce River.

== See also ==
- List of rivers of Minas Gerais
