= Aiuruoca River =

Coordinates: 21°27′16″S 44°26′39″W

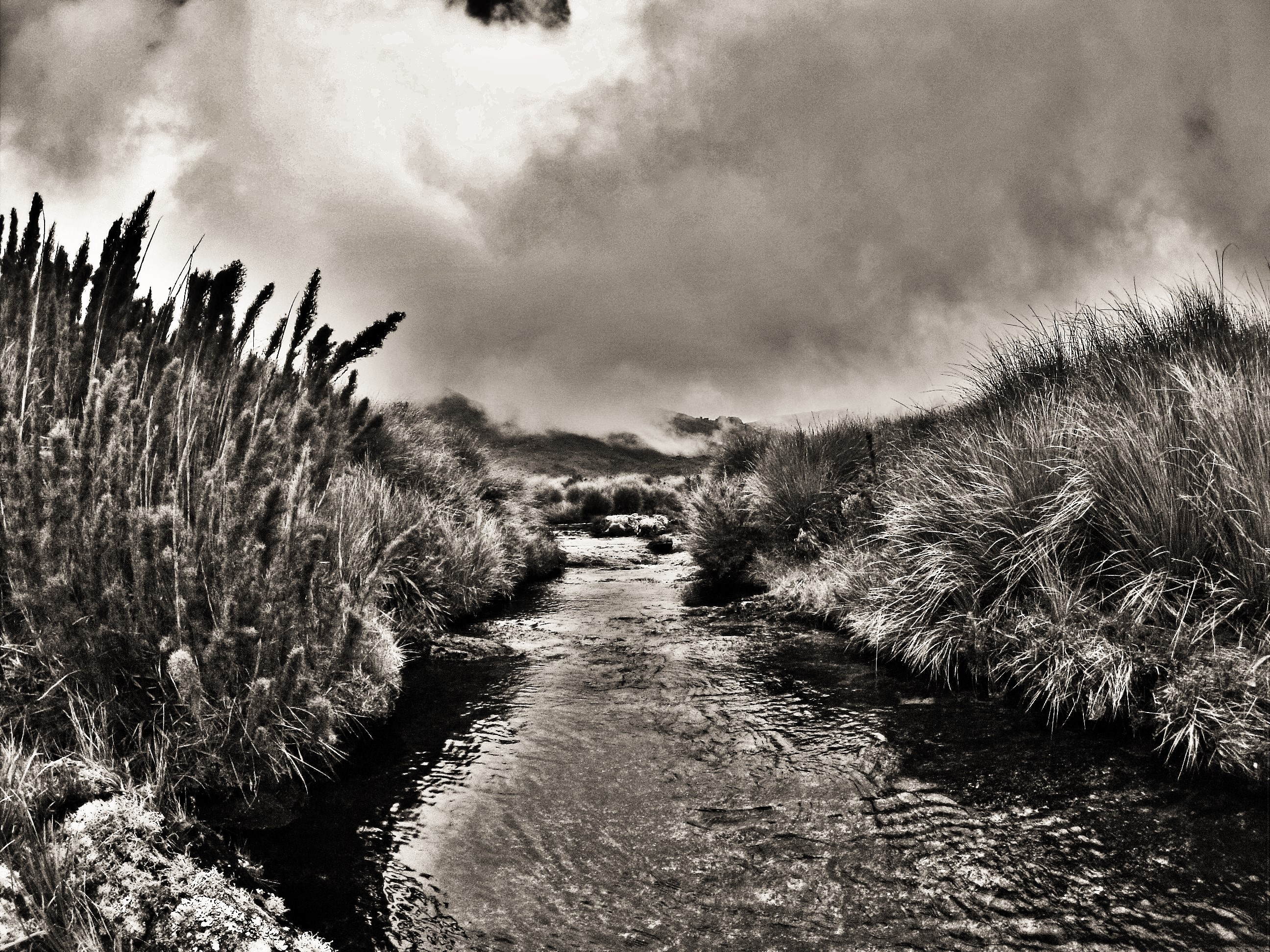

Location
- Country: Brazil

Physical characteristics
- Source
  - location: Minas Gerais state

The Aiuruoca River is a river of Minas Gerais state in southeastern Brazil.

== See also ==
- List of rivers of Minas Gerais
