= Jaguari River (Piracicaba River tributary) =

River in Brazil

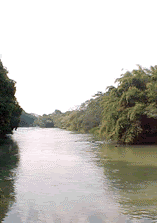
- Jaguari River in Paulínia

Location
- Country: Brazil

Physical characteristics
- Source
  - location: Mantiqueira Mountains
- Mouth: Piracicaba River
  - coordinates: 22°42′S 47°18′W

The Jaguari River is a Brazilian river in the states of São Paulo and Minas Gerais.

The Jaguari is a tributary of the Piracicaba River.

== See also ==
- List of rivers of Minas Gerais
