= São Domingos River (Minas Gerais) =

Location
- Country: Brazil

Physical characteristics
- Source
  - location: Minas Gerais state
- Mouth: Paranaíba River
  - coordinates: 19°13′S 50°44′W

The São Domingos River is a river of Minas Gerais state in southeastern Brazil.

== See also ==
- List of rivers of Minas Gerais
