= Corrente River (Doce River tributary) =

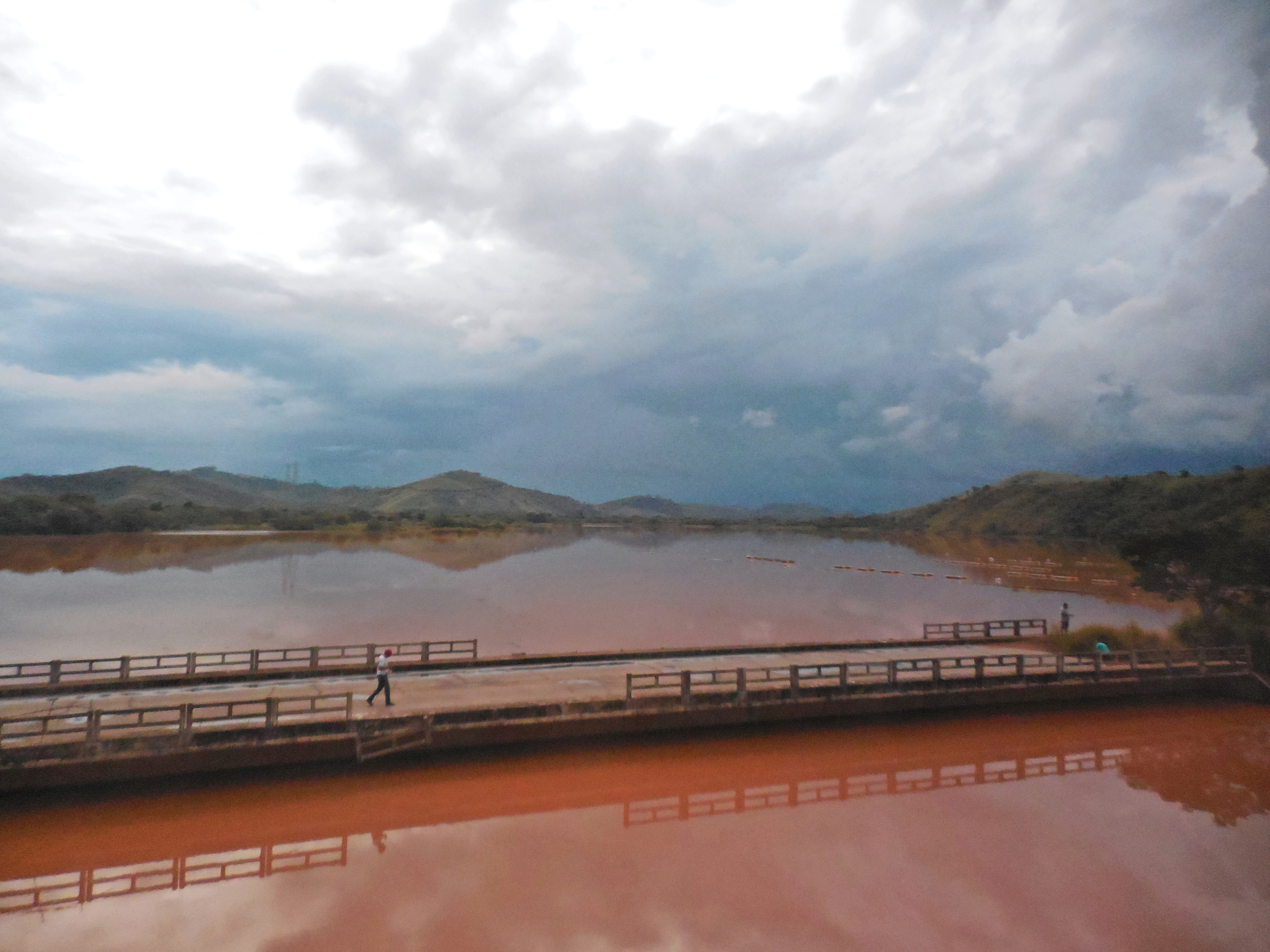

- Location within Brazil

Location
- Country: Brazil

Physical characteristics
- Source
  - location: Minas Gerais state
- Mouth: Doce River
  - coordinates: 19°2′S 42°9′W

The Corrente River is a river of Minas Gerais state in southeastern Brazil. It is a tributary of the Doce River.

== See also ==
- List of rivers of Minas Gerais
