= Rio do Peixe (Mojiguaçu River tributary) =

Location
- Country: Brazil

Physical characteristics
- Source
  - location: Minas Gerais state
- Mouth
  - location: Mojiguaçu River
  - coordinates: 22.3670°S 46.8630°W

The Rio do Peixe is a river of São Paulo and Minas Gerais states in southeastern Brazil. It is a tributary of the Mojiguaçu River.

== See also ==
- List of rivers of Minas Gerais
- List of rivers of São Paulo
