= Pardo River (São Francisco River tributary) =

Location
- Country: Brazil

Physical characteristics
- Source
  - location: Minas Gerais state
  - coordinates: 15.283874°S 45.590644°W
- Mouth
  - location: São Francisco River
  - coordinates: 15.800146°S 44.773401°W

The Pardo River is a river of Minas Gerais state in southeastern Brazil. It is a tributary of the São Francisco River.

== See also ==
- List of rivers of Minas Gerais
