= Carinhanha River =

Coordinates: 14°20′14″S 43°47′04″W

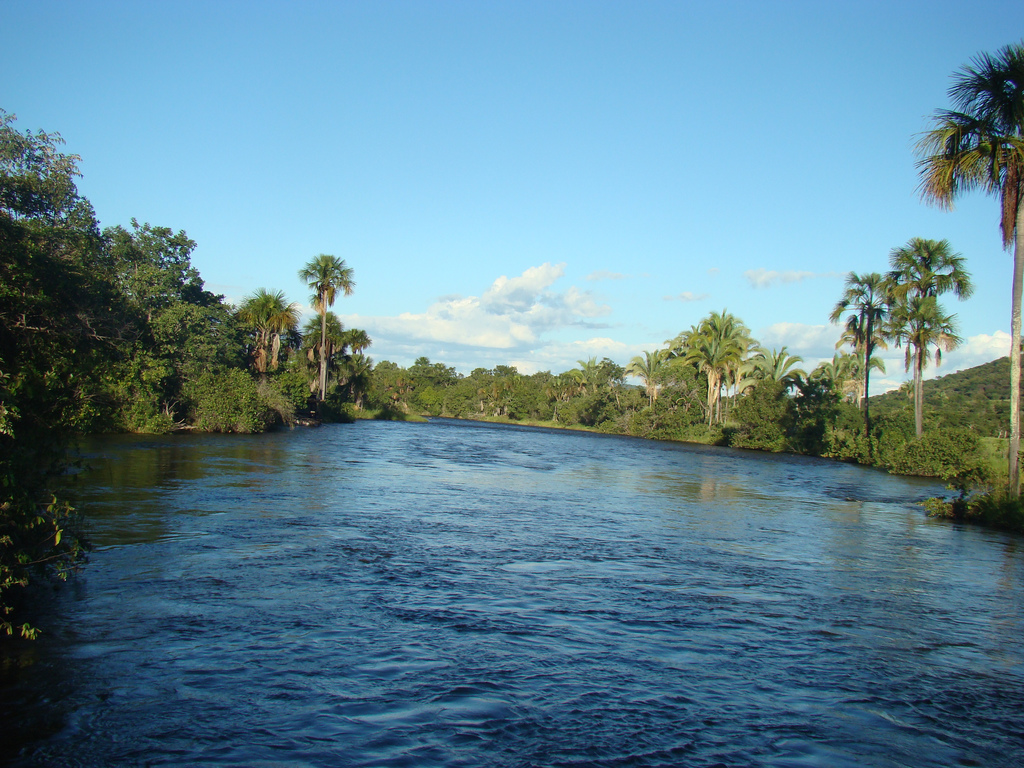
- Carinhanha River

Location
- Country: Brazil

Physical characteristics
- Source
  - location: Bahia state
- Mouth
  - location: Bahia state

The Carinhanha River (Portuguese: Rio Carinhanha) is a river of Bahia and Minas Gerais states in eastern Brazil.

== See also ==
- List of rivers of Bahia
- List of rivers of Minas Gerais
