= Escurinho River =

Coordinates: 17°31′37″S 46°38′31″W

Location
- Country: Brazil

Physical characteristics
- Source
  - location: Minas Gerais state

The Escurinho River is a river of Minas Gerais state in southeastern Brazil.

== See also ==
- List of rivers of Minas Gerais
