= Mandu River =

River in Brazil

Coordinates: 22°14′05″S 45°55′09″W

The Mandu River is a Brazilian river in the state of Minas Gerais. Its source is located near Ouro Fino. The river passes through the municipalities of Ouro Fino, Borda da Mata, and Pouso Alegre. It discharges into the Sapucaí-Mirim River.
