= Pardo River (Bahia) =

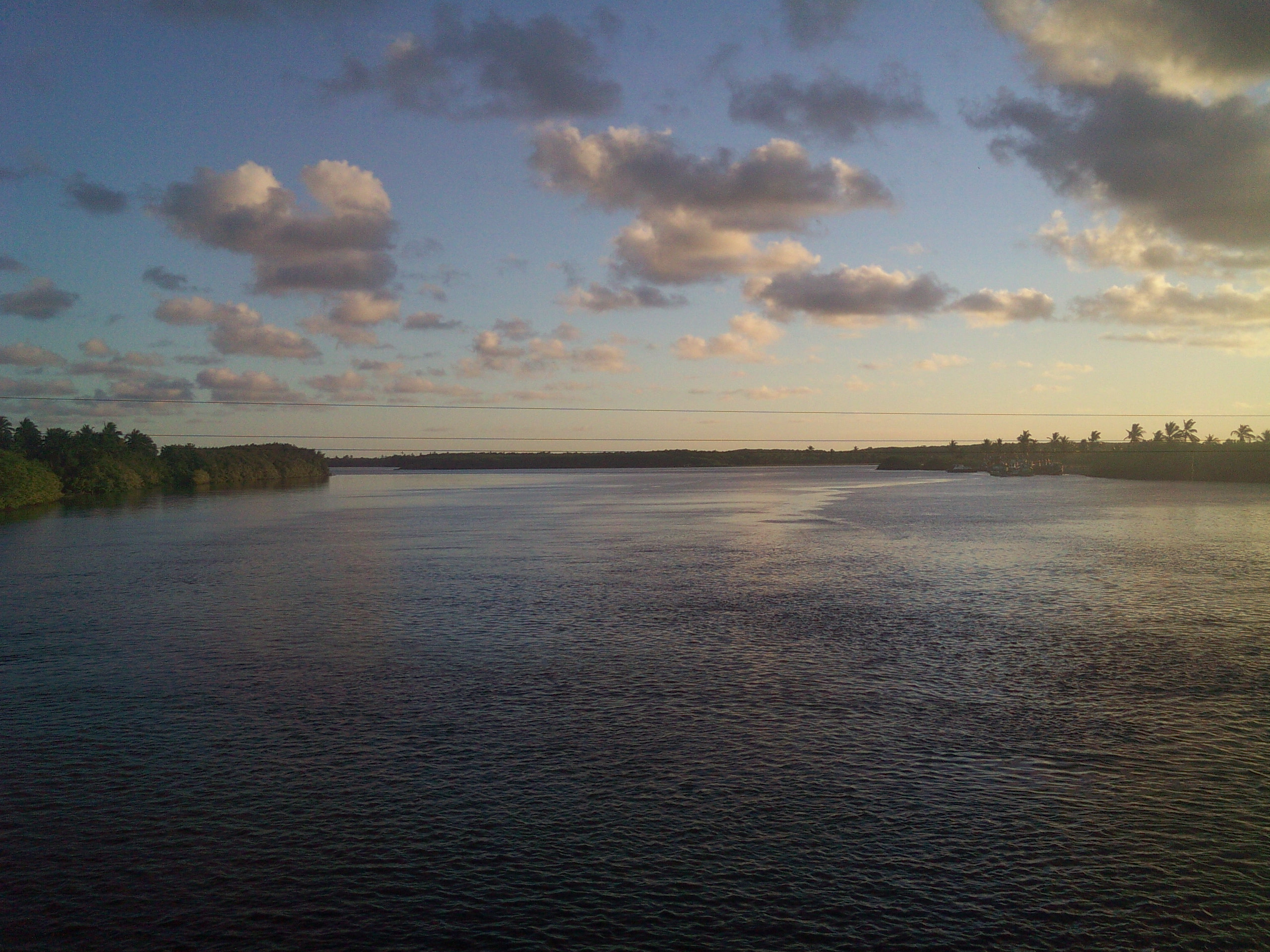
- Pardo River in Canavieiras, Bahia, Brasil

- Location within Brazil

Location
- Country: Brazil

Physical characteristics
- Source
  - location: Bahia state
- Mouth: Atlantic Ocean
  - coordinates: 15°39′S 38°57′W

The Pardo River is a river of Bahia and Minas Gerais states in eastern Brazil.

== See also ==
- List of rivers of Bahia
- List of rivers of Minas Gerais
