= Pacuí River (São Francisco River tributary) =

Location
- Country: Brazil

Physical characteristics
- Source
  - location: Minas Gerais state
- Mouth: São Francisco River
  - coordinates: 16°45′S 45°1′W

The Pacuí River is a river of Minas Gerais state in southeastern Brazil. It is a tributary of the São Francisco River.

== See also ==
- List of rivers of Minas Gerais
