= Rio Verde (Sapucaí) =

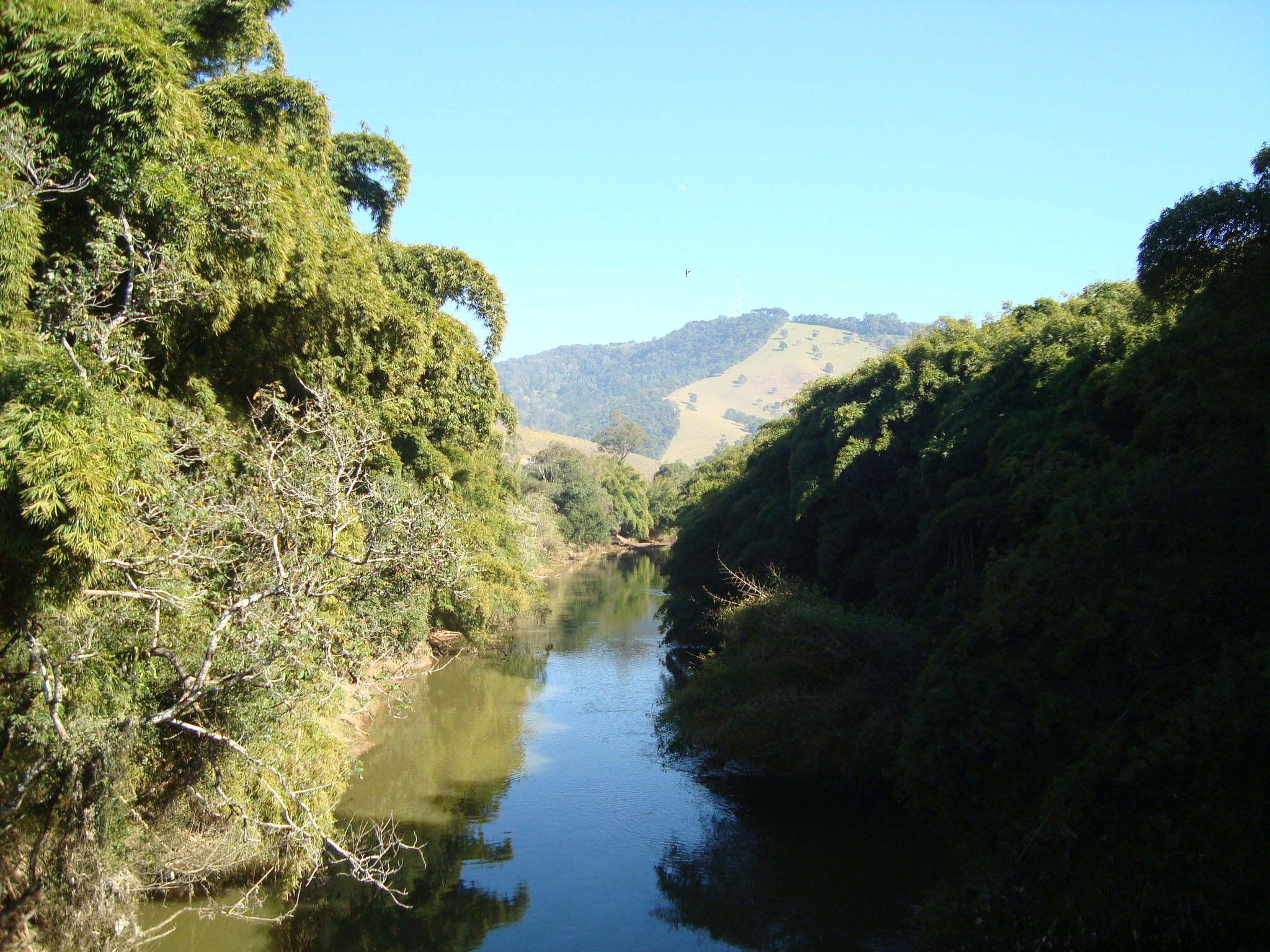

Location
- Country: Brazil

Physical characteristics
- Source
  - location: Minas Gerais state
  - elevation: 2600 m
- Mouth: Sapucaí River
  - coordinates: 21°27′S 45°39′W
  - elevation: 800 m
- Length: 220 km
- Basin size: 6,891.4 km²

Rio Verde (Portuguese for "green river") is a river of Minas Gerais state in southeastern Brazil. It is a tributary of the Sapucaí River.

== See also ==
- List of rivers of Minas Gerais
