= Tijuco River =

Coordinates: 18°40′49″S 50°4′8″W

Location
- Country: Brazil

Physical characteristics
- Source
  - location: Minas Gerais state
- Mouth
  - location: Paranaíba River

The Tijuco River (Portuguese, Rio Tijuco) is a river of Minas Gerais state in southeastern Brazil. Geologically, the Tijuco River basin is inserted in the plateau unit of Central Brazil, in a geotectonic sedimentary basin called Paraná Sedimentary Basin.

It is a tributary of the Paranaíba River, which it joins in the reservoir created by São Simão Dam.

== See also ==
- Tributaries of the Río de la Plata
