= Gorutuba River =

- Location within Brazil

Location
- Country: Brazil

Physical characteristics
- Source
  - location: Minas Gerais state
- Mouth: Verde Grande River
  - coordinates: 14°59′S 43°31′W

The Gorutuba River is a river of Minas Gerais state in southeastern Brazil.

== See also ==
- List of rivers of Minas Gerais
