= Araguari River (Minas Gerais) =

Coordinates: 18°20′42″S 48°38′5″W

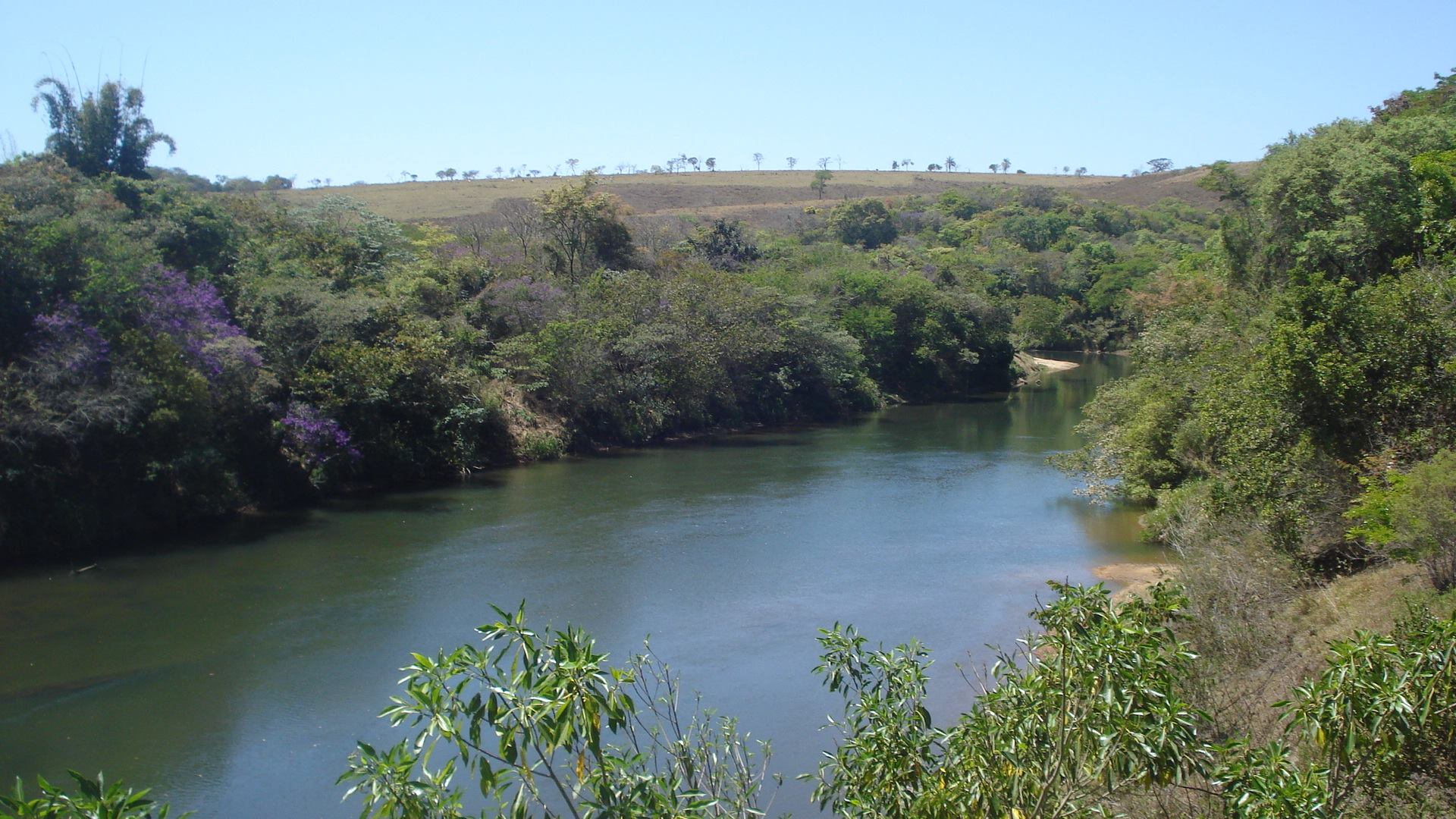

- Location of mouth

Location
- Country: Brazil

Physical characteristics
- Source
  - location: Minas Gerais state
- Mouth
  - location: Paranaíba River

The Araguari River (Portuguese, Rio Araguari also called Rio das Velhas) is a river of Minas Gerais state in southeastern Brazil. It is a tributary of the Paranaíba River, which it joins in the reservoir created by Itumbiara Dam.

== See also ==
- Tributaries of the Río de la Plata
