= Pará River (Minas Gerais) =

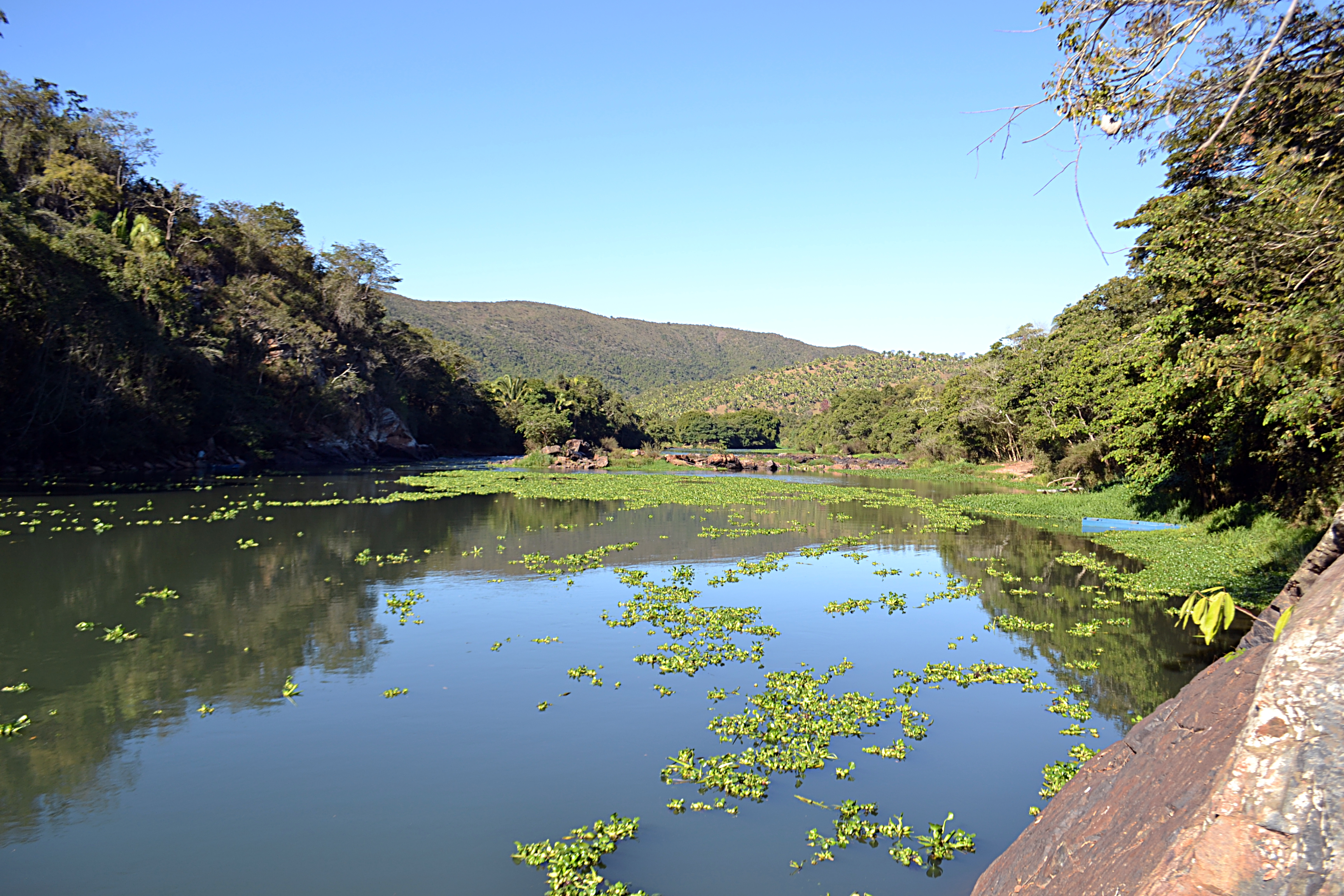

Location
- Country: Brazil

Physical characteristics
- Source
  - location: Minas Gerais state
- Mouth: São Francisco River
  - coordinates: 19°13′S 45°8′W

The Pará River is a river of Minas Gerais state in southeastern Brazil.

== See also ==
- List of rivers of Minas Gerais
