= Cristóvão Lins =

German merchant (born 1529)

- Christoph Linz
- Born: 1529; Dorndorf, Holy Roman Empire
- Occupation: Merchant
- Employer: Fugger family
- Known for: Exploration and colonization of the Captaincy of Pernambuco
- Spouse: Adriana de Holanda
- Children: 4
- Family: Lins

Christoph Linz von Dondorf (born 1529), also known in Brazil as Cristóvão Lins, is a German merchant known for exploring the Captaincy of Pernambuco, where he implemented the first engenhos and stablished the Lins family in Colonial Brazil. He was also part of the Potiguara War, and helped to expel, enslave and exterminate the Potiguaras and Caetés.

== Byography ==
Cristoph Linz was born in 1529, Dorndorf, Augsburg-Land, Holy Roman Empire. He was a New Christian and worked for the Fugger family.

He arrived in Várzea do Capibaribe, modern-day Pernambuco, in the Captaincy of Pernambuco between 1566 and 1572, where he was known as Cristóvão. Between 1575 and 1585, he explored the south, in modern-day Alagoas, where he was part of the Potiguara War in order to pacify the territory for sugarcane plantation. He and Jorge de Albuquerque were important for the exploration of the Captaincy. He was part of Duarte Coelho army as Captain of people from Várzea do Capibaribe, taking part in the invasion of Cabo de Santo Agostinho. Lins was a slave-owner and probably used African slaves during the campaign. During the invasion, he enslaved, expelled and exterminated the Potiguaras and Caetés. In 1608 Lins was appointed as alcaide-mor of Porto Calvo, the first Brazilian freguesia, and given a sesmaria by Duarte Coelho.

The territory between the rivers Manguaba, Camaragibe, Santo Antônio Grande and Tatuamunha was divided with Jorde de Albuquerque. His semaria covered where today are located the cities of Porto Calvo, Porto de Pedras, Camaragibe, Maragogi, Colônia Leopoldina, part of São Luís do Quitunde, maybe extending until Santo Antônio Grande River as its south frontier, and until Cabo de Santo Agostinho as its north frontier. He built Porto Calvo as a fortress to defend the territory from the Dutch. In 1608, Lins gave half of his land to his nephew, Rodrigo Barros Pimentel in hope the region would develop.

Lins is known for stablishing two engenhos in modern-day Pernambuco and five in Alagoas. He stablished Pirapama, sold to João Pais Barreto in 1586, and Santo Antônio do Cabo in c. 1595 in Cabo de Santo Agostinho. His engenhos in Alagoas are Buenos Aires in Camaragibe, the first engenho of Alagoas, Escurial, Morro de baixo, Morro do Meio and Maranhão in the region of Porto Calvo. He also had cattle.

Lins is one of the first people to introduce slave labor in Brazil. His slaves from Porto Calvo were frequently kidnapped to join Quilombo dos Palmares.

== Personal life ==
Cristóvão married with Adriana de Holanda and had at least four children, Bartolomeu, Inês, Brites and Arnal de Holanda, thus establishing the Lins family in Brazil.
