= Japaratinga =

Municipality in Alagoas, Brazil

- Municipality of Alagoas, Brazil
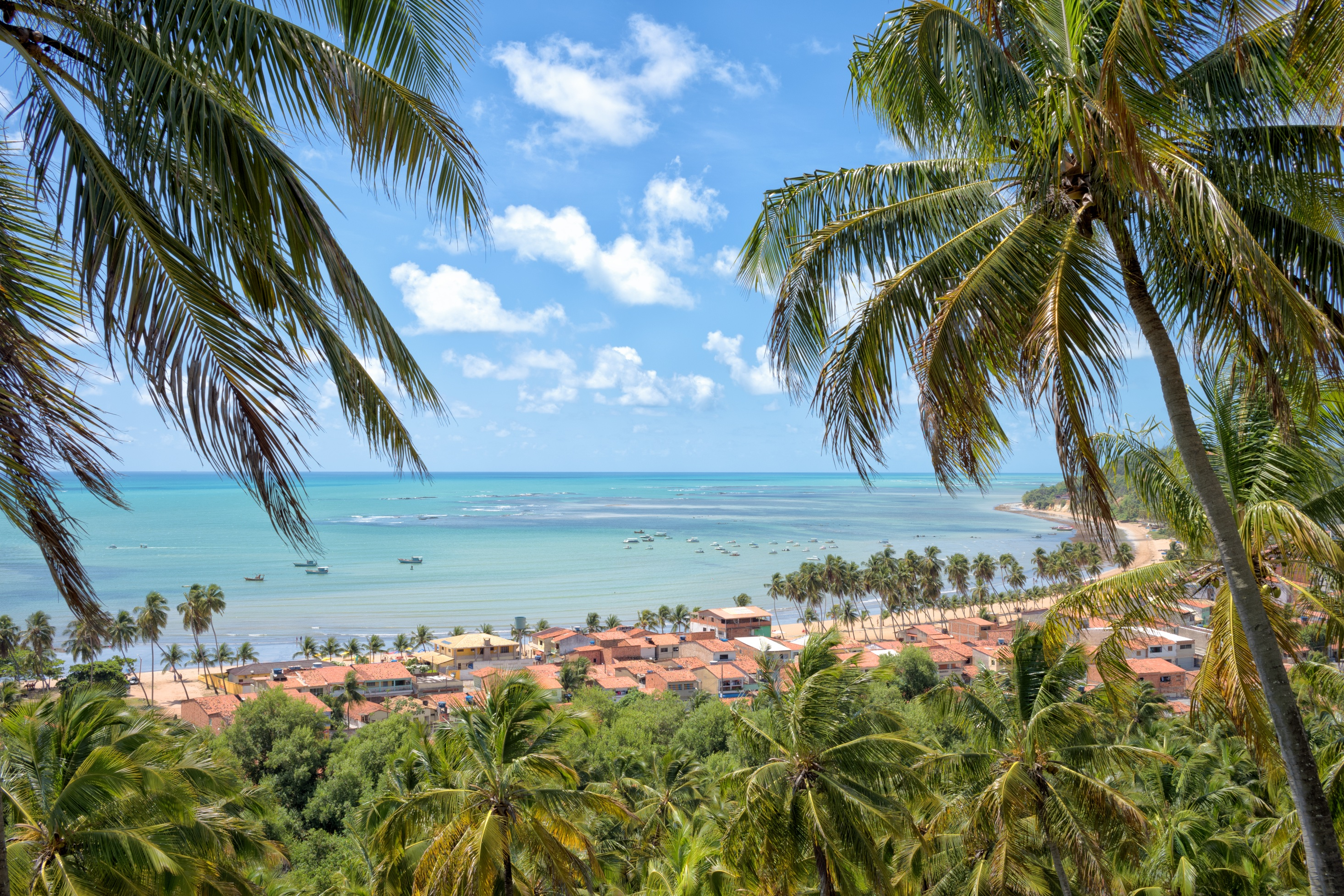
- View of the coast from Monte Tabor Lookout Tower in Japaratinga

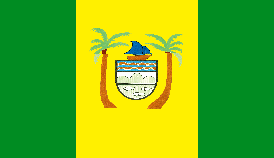
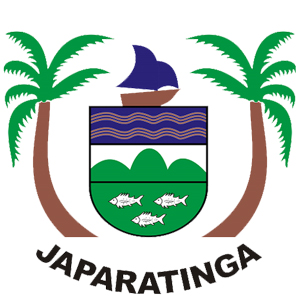
- Flag Coat of arms

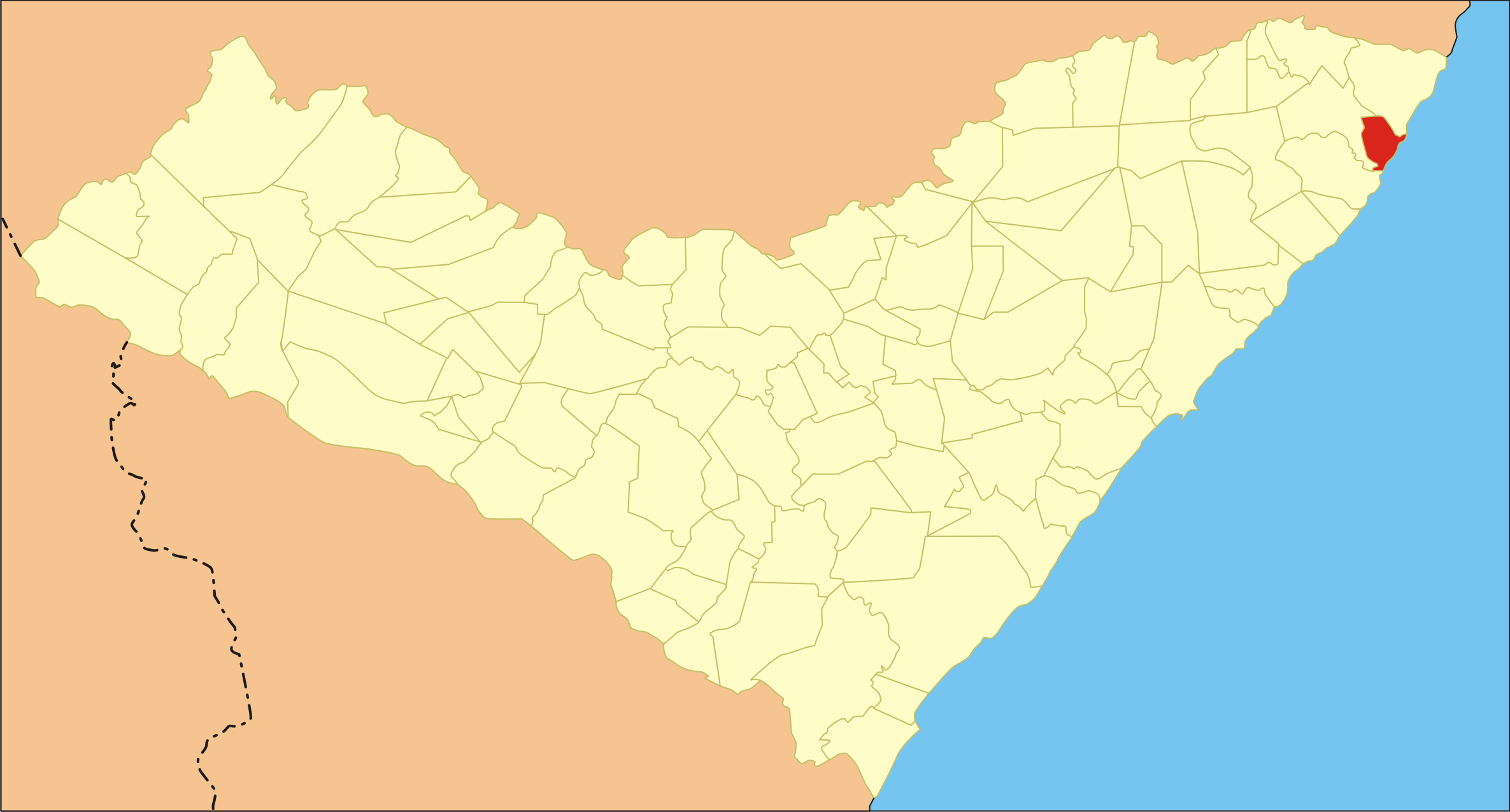
- Location of Japaratinga in Alagoas

- Location within Brazil Location within South America
- Coordinates: 9°5′16″S 35°15′28″W
- Country: Brazil
- Region: Northeast
- State: Alagoas
- Founded: 23 July 1960

Government
  - Mayor: José Severino da Silva (MDB) (2025-2028)
  - Vice Mayor: Jailton dos Santos (Republicanos) (2025-2028)

Area
  - Total: 85.356 km^{2} (32.956 sq mi)
- Elevation: 5 m (16 ft)

Population (2022)
  - Total: 9,219
  - Density: 108.01/km^{2} (279.7/sq mi)
- Demonym: Japaratinguense (Brazilian Portuguese)
- Time zone: UTC-03:00 (Brasília Time)
- Postal code: 57950-000, 57953-000
- HDI (2010): 0.570 – medium
- Website: japaratinga.al.gov.br

Japaratinga (Central northeastern portuguese pronunciation: [ʒɐpɐɾɐˈtĩɡɐ]) is a municipality located in the Brazilian state of Alagoas. Its population is 8,403 (2020) and its area is 86 km^{2} (33 sq mi).

== Geography ==
Japaratinga is located along the coast, near the eastern-most point of the main South American continent.

=== Climate ===
Japaratinga has a tropical forest, characterized by high rainfall, with definitions setting minimum normal annual rainfall between 2,000 mm (about 78 inches or 2 meters) and 1,700 mm (about 67 inches). The soil can be poor due to high rainfall leaching out soluble nutrients.

== Demographics ==
As of the census of 2005, there were around 6,727 people living in Japaratinga. According to the census, the racial makeup of the city was majority White and Multiracial; minority Black or African American. People of Portuguese, Italian, Spanish, French, American and English descent form the largest ethnic groups in the city.

== Economy ==
Japaratinga has a number of Hotels and Pousadas (small hotels). Tourism is the most important economic activity in the city.

== Gallery ==
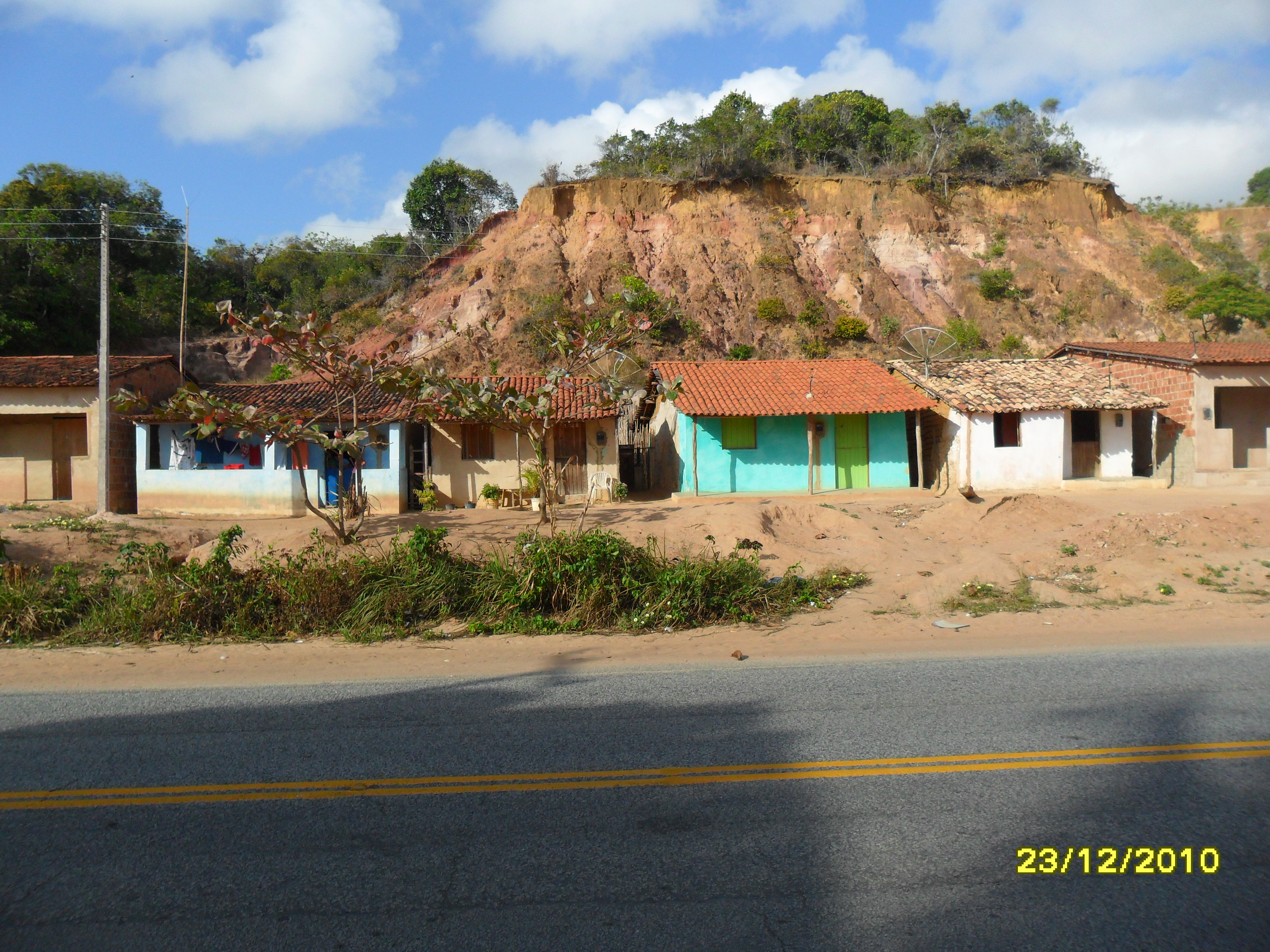
Houses in Japaratinga

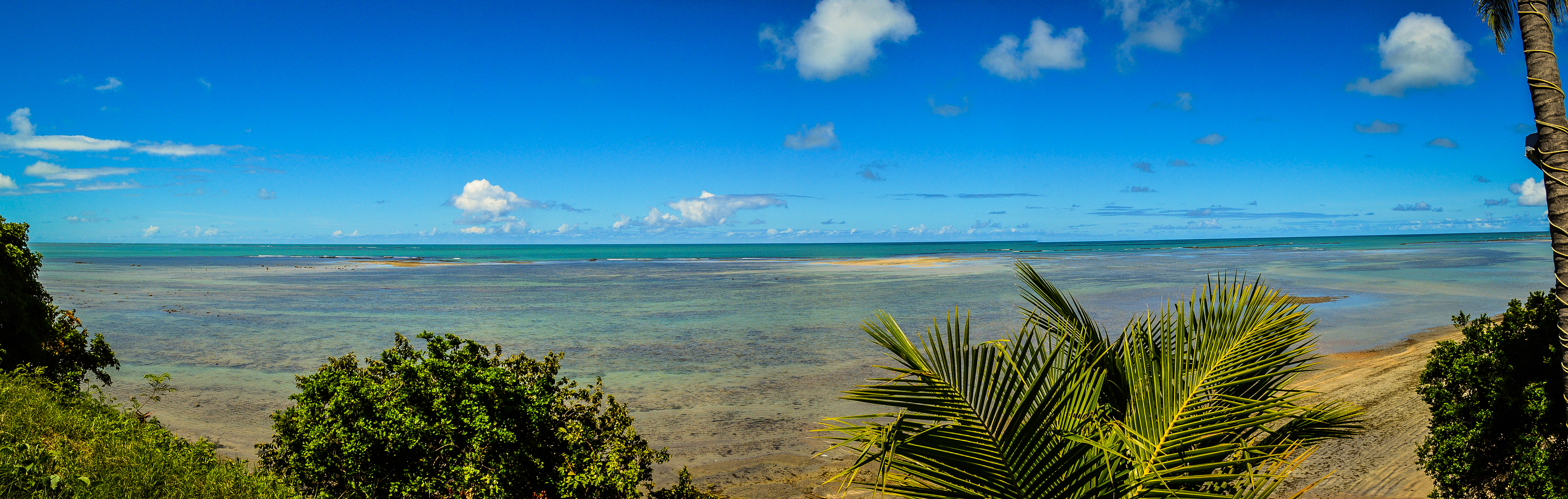
View of the Atlantic Ocean

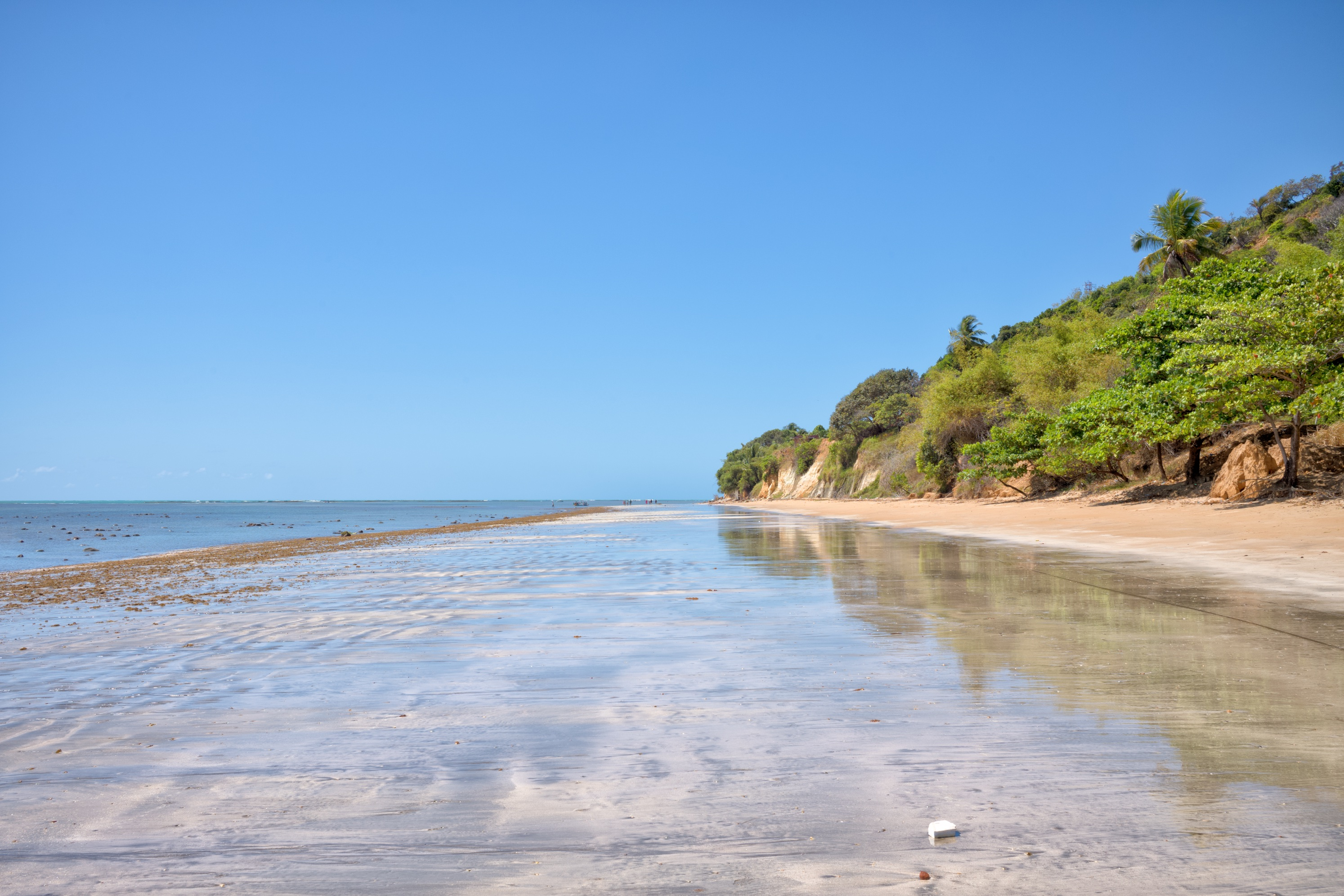
Beach in Japaratinga

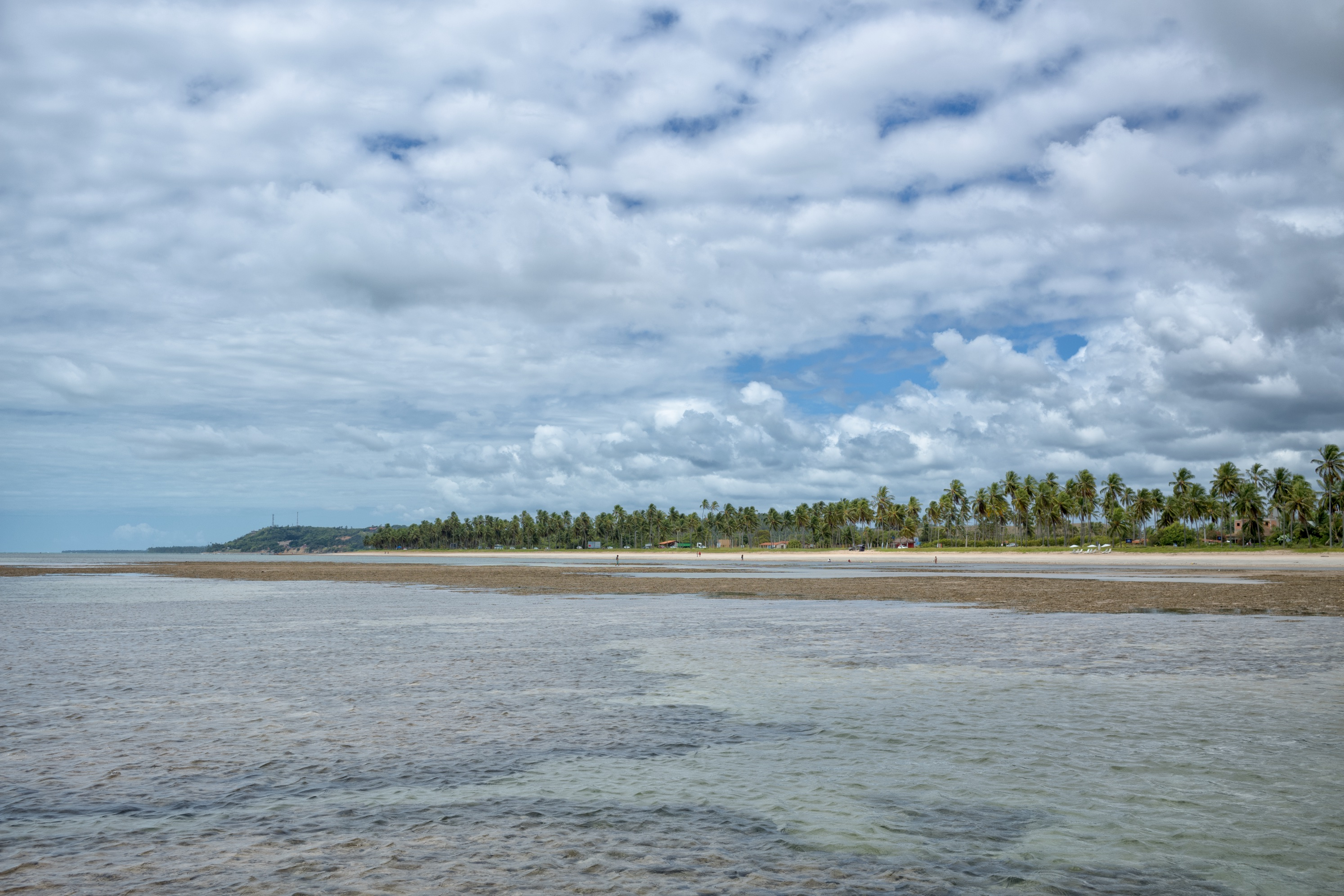
View of beach in Japaratinga

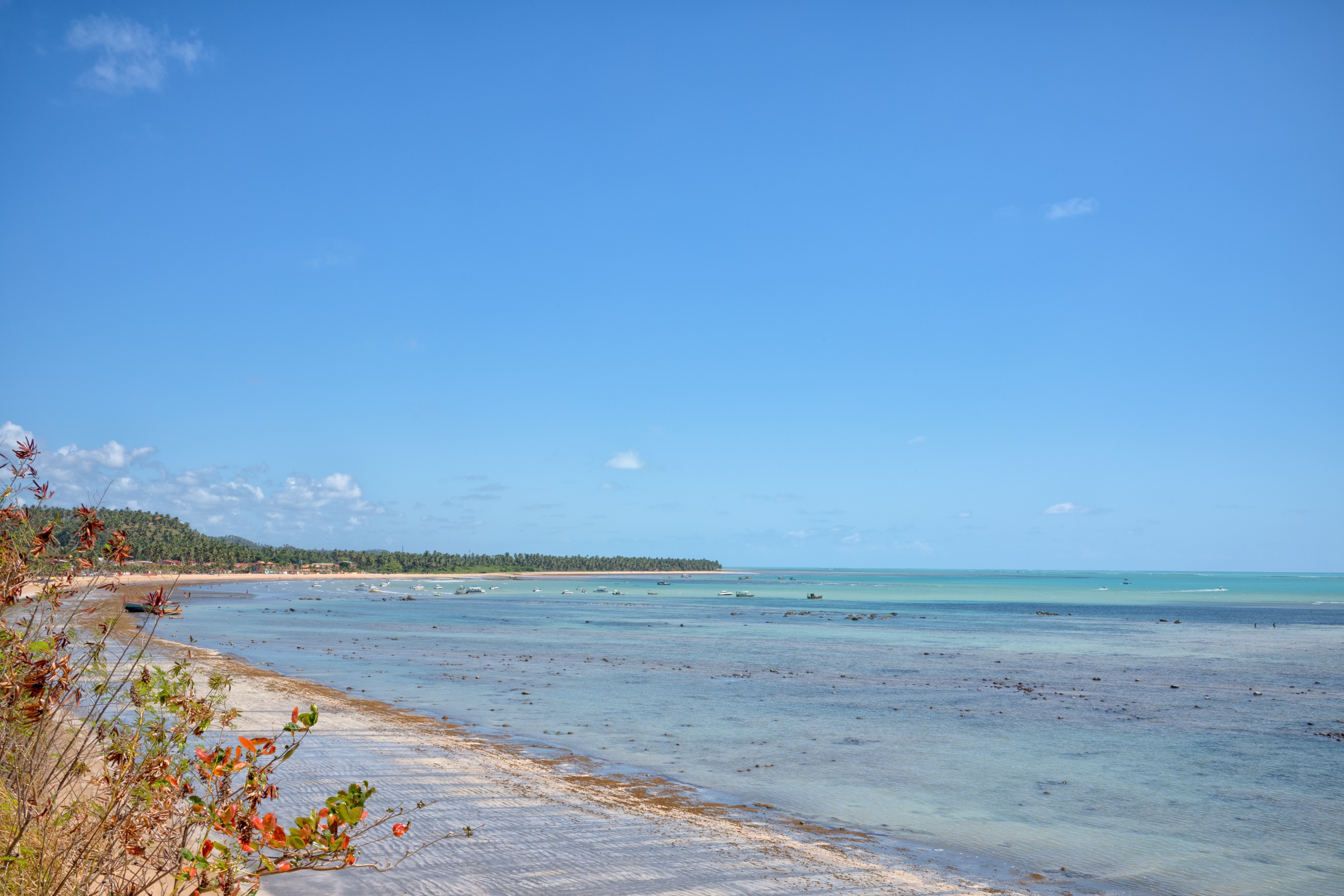
Beach in Japaratinga

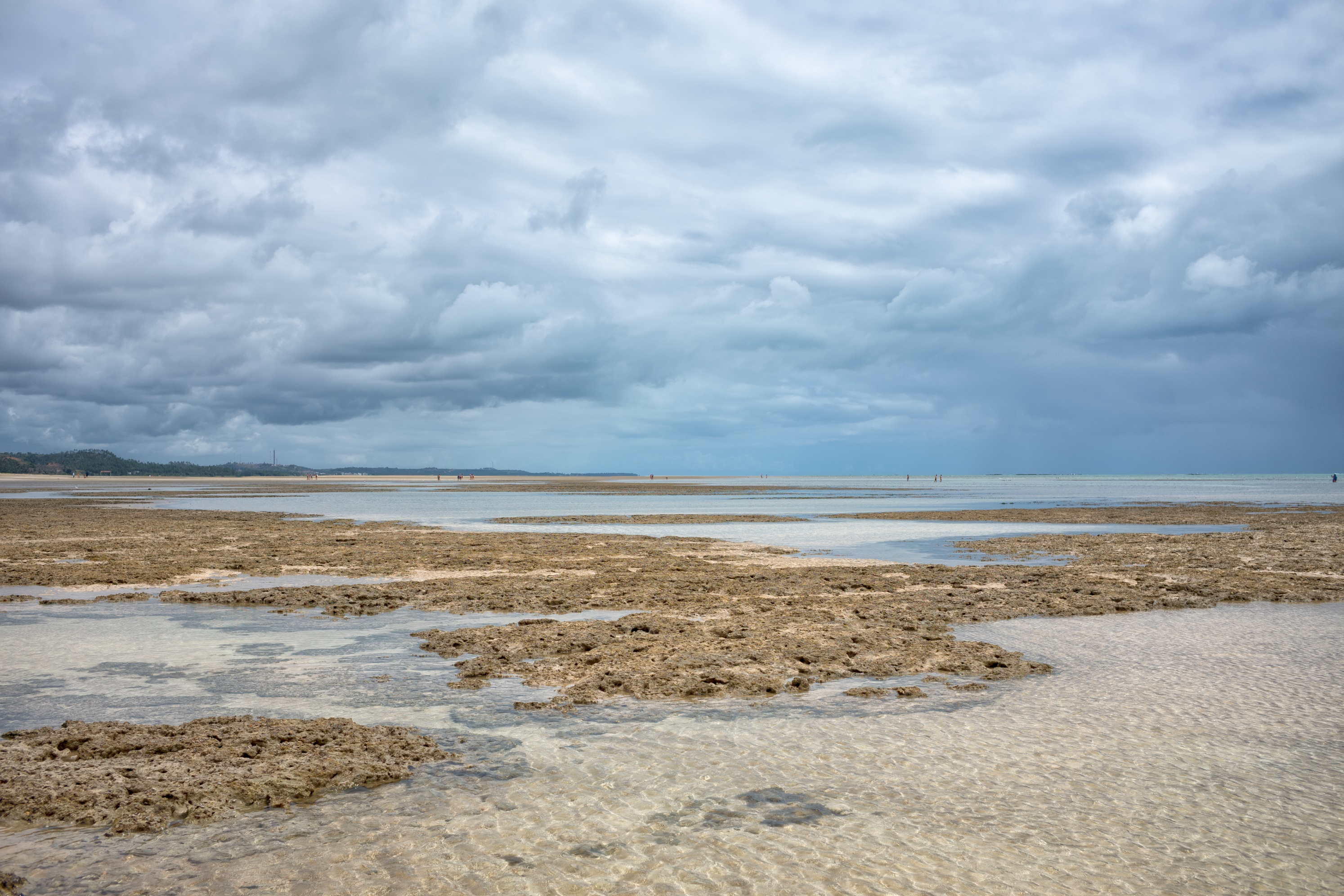
Beach in Japaratinga

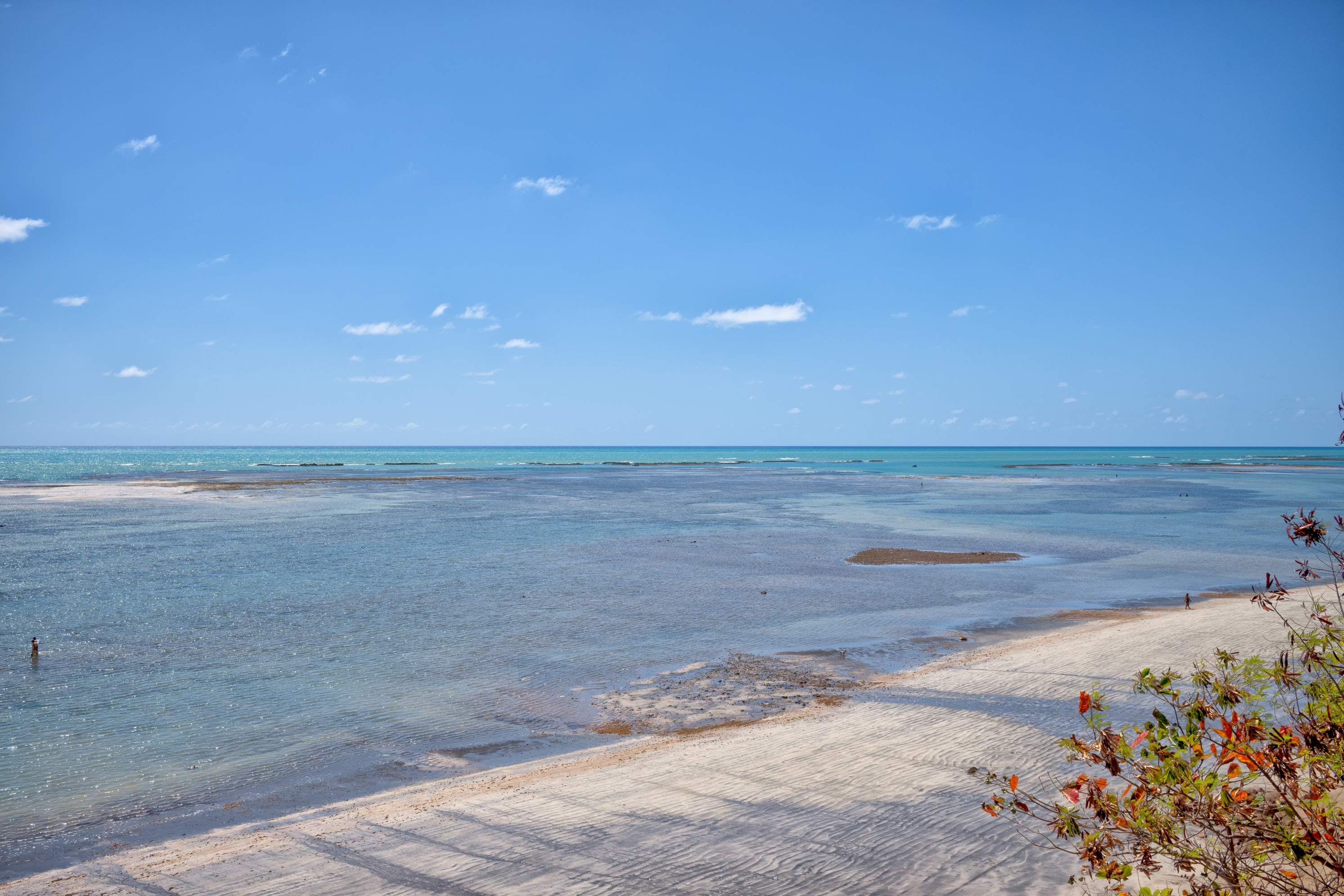
Beach in Japaratinga

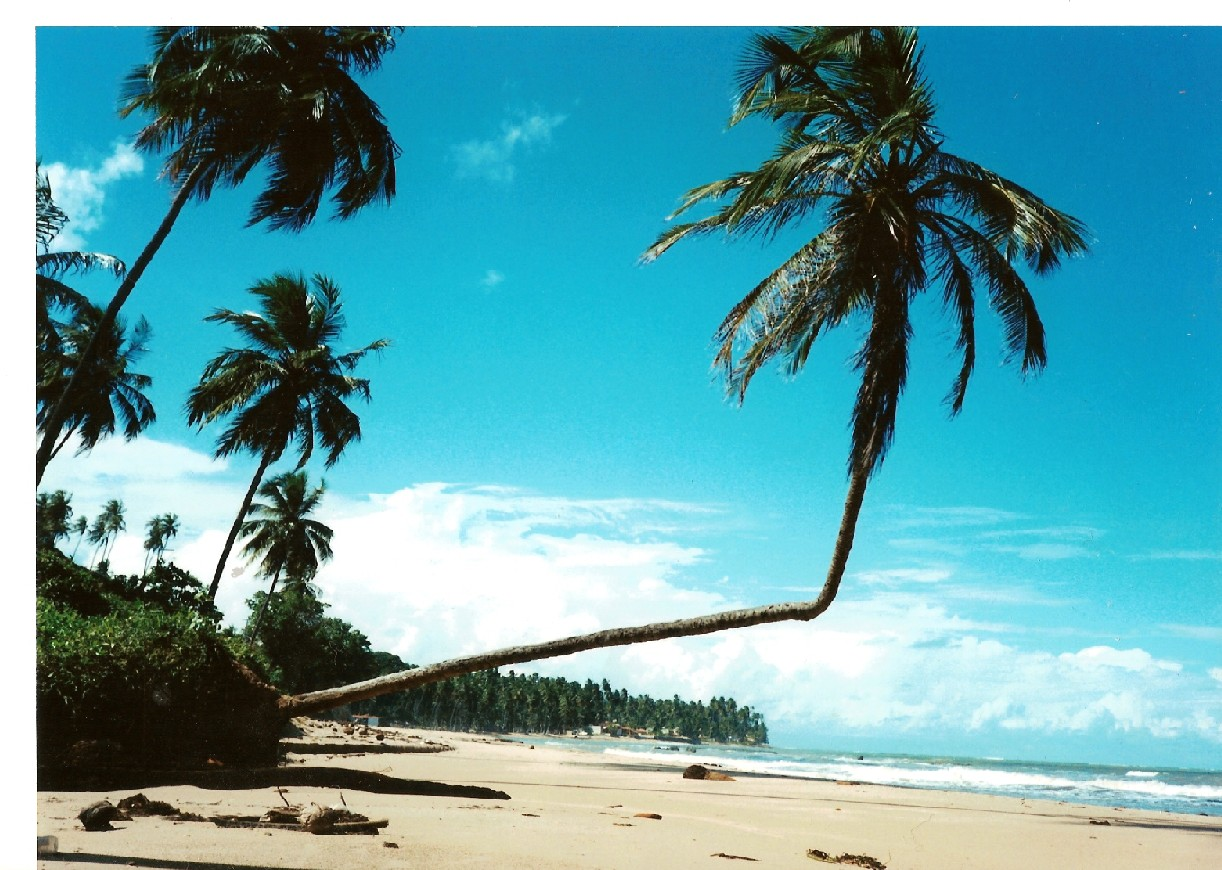
Beach in Japaratinga

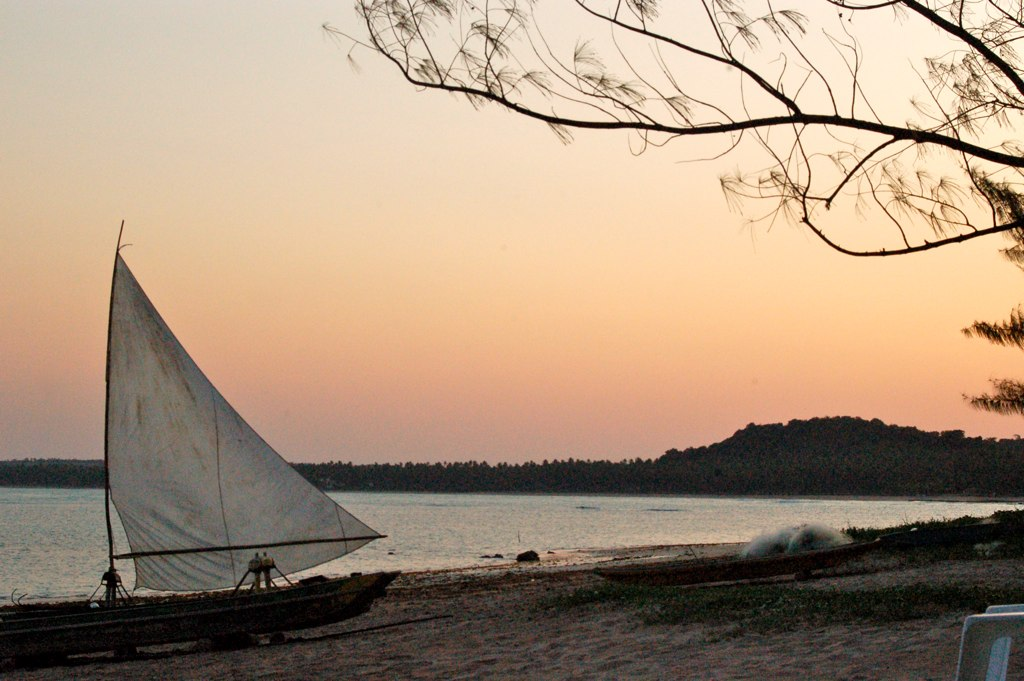
Sunset on a beach in Japaratinga

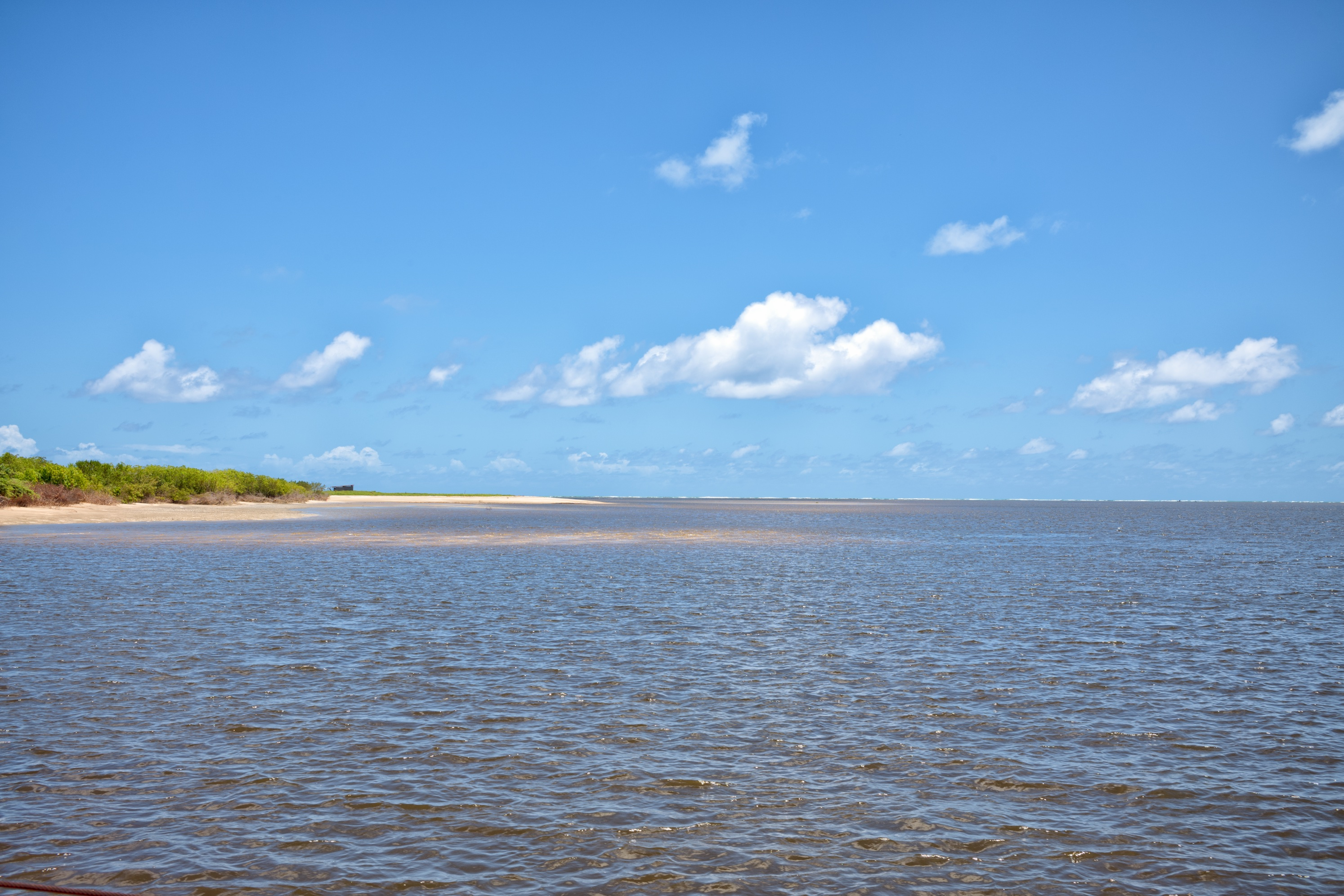
Mouth of the Manguaba River, the border between Japaratinga and Porto de Pedras

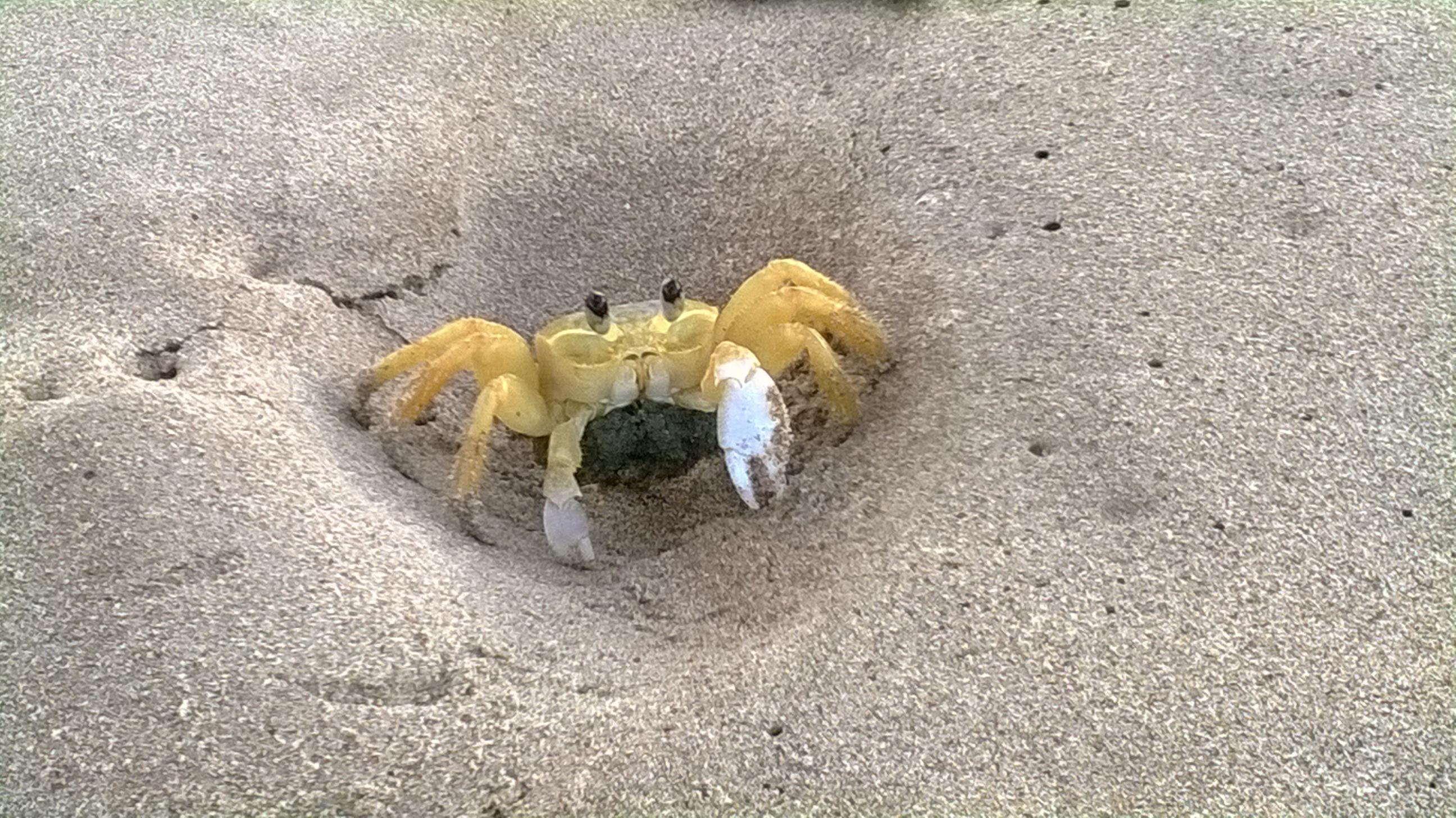
Atlantic ghost crab on a beach in Japaratinga

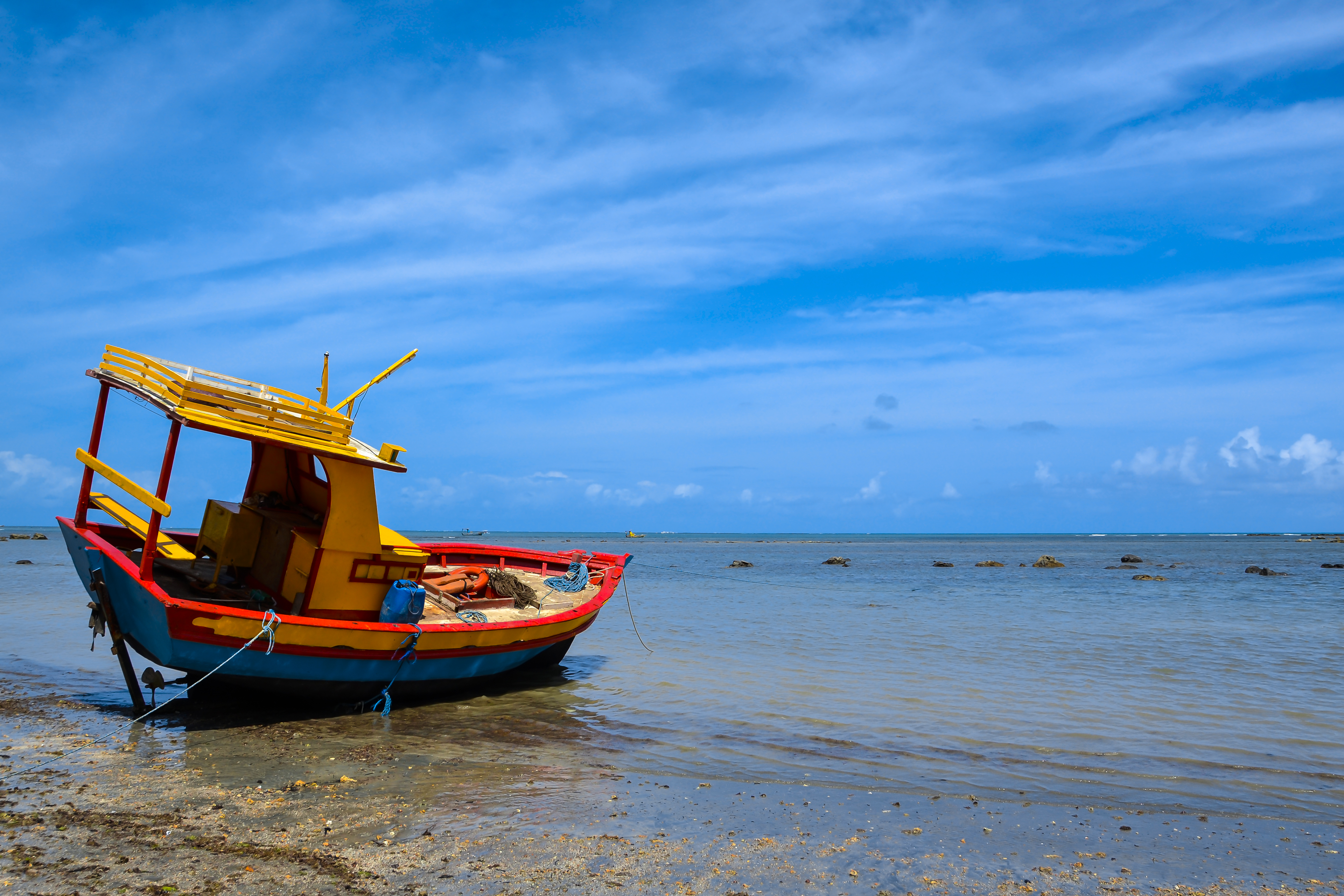
Boat on a beach in Japaratinga

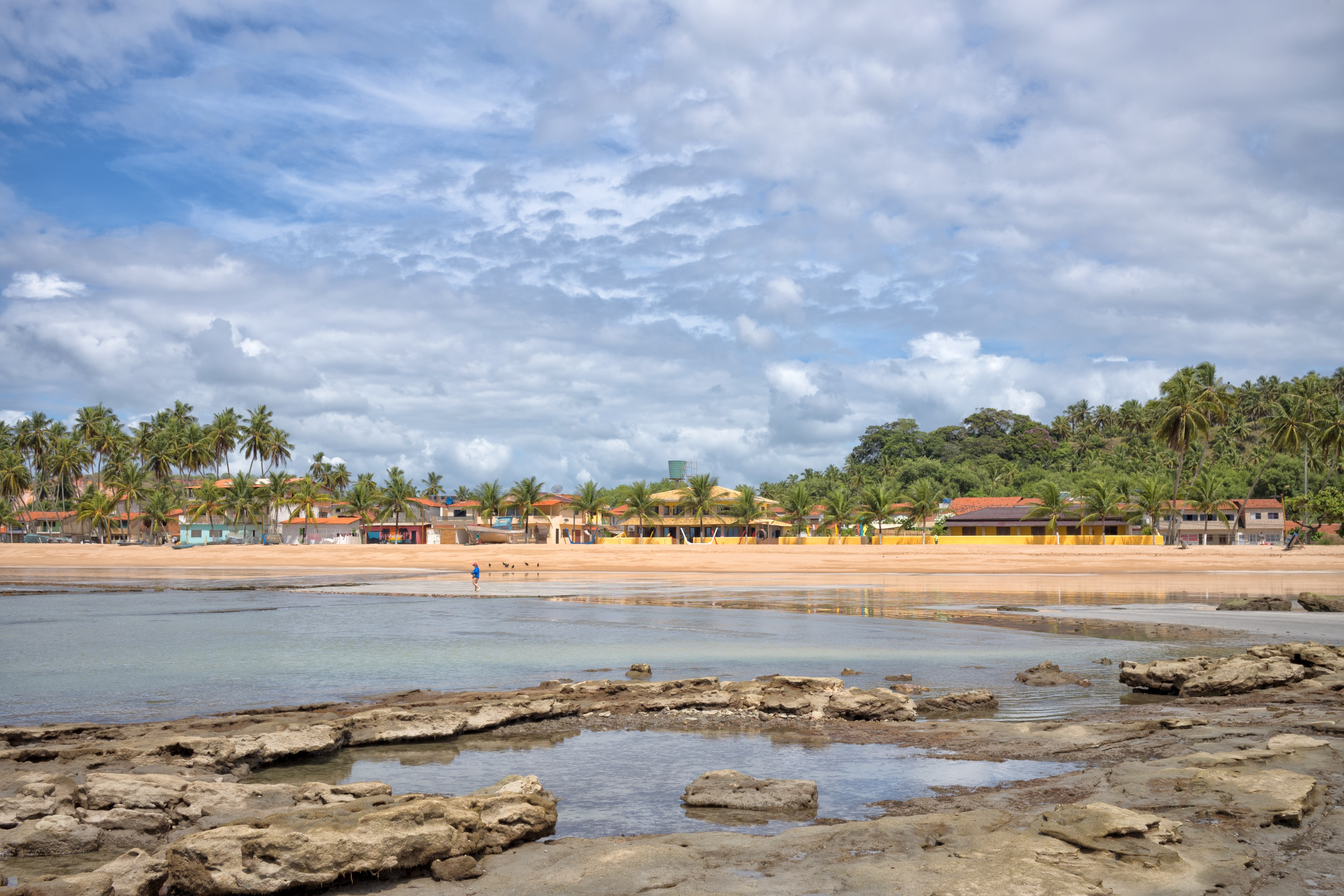
Salgado Beach

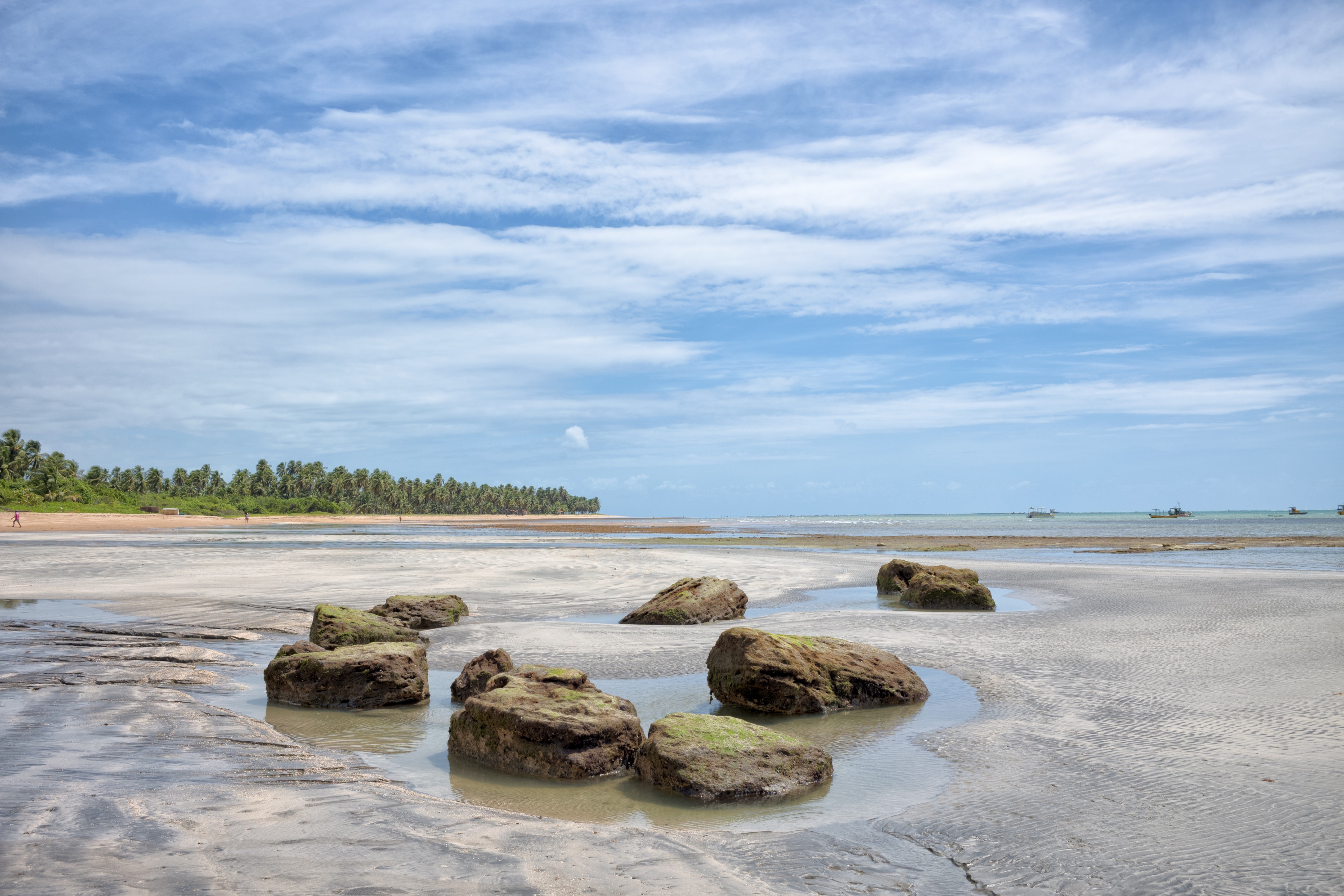
Salgado Beach

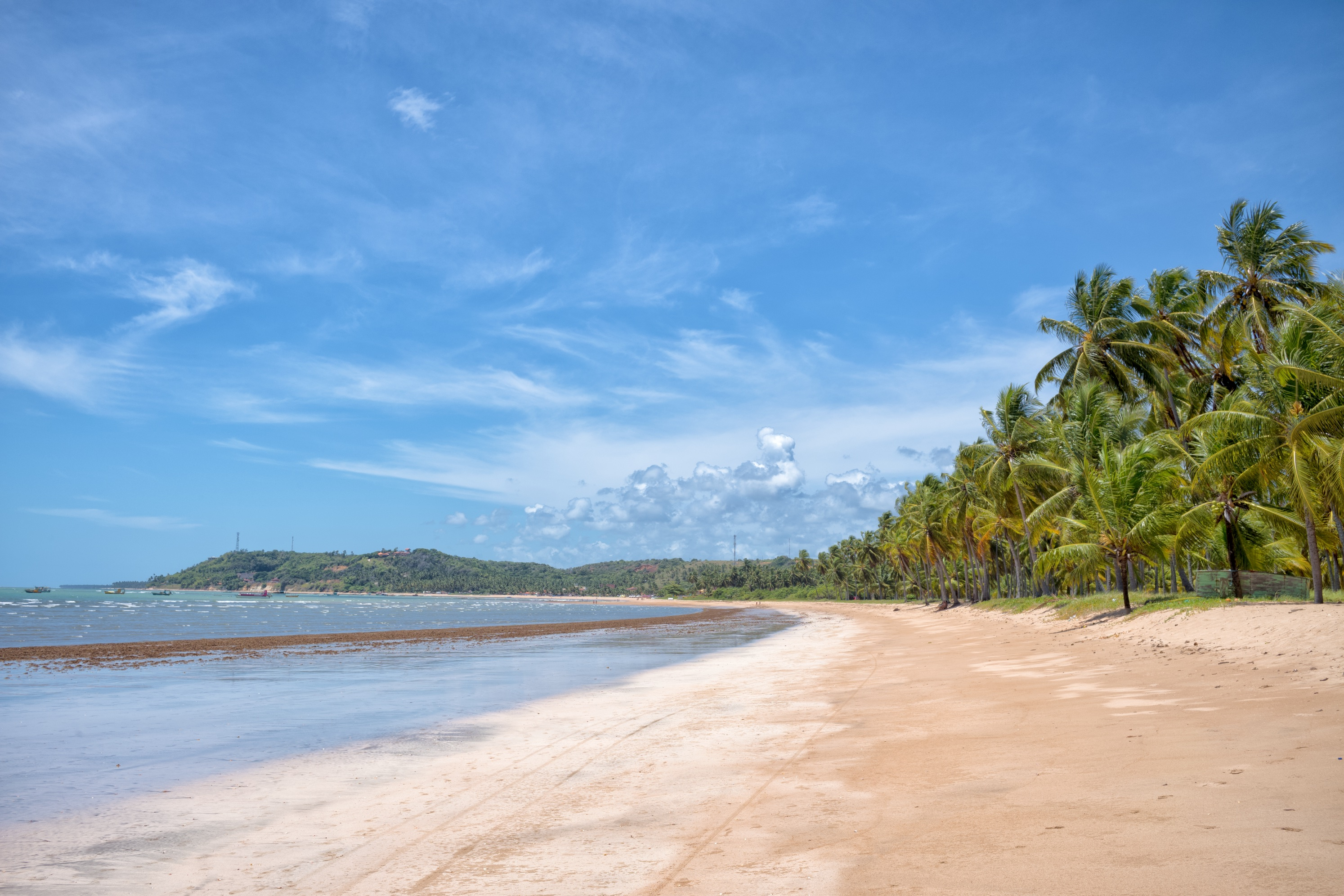
Salgado Beach

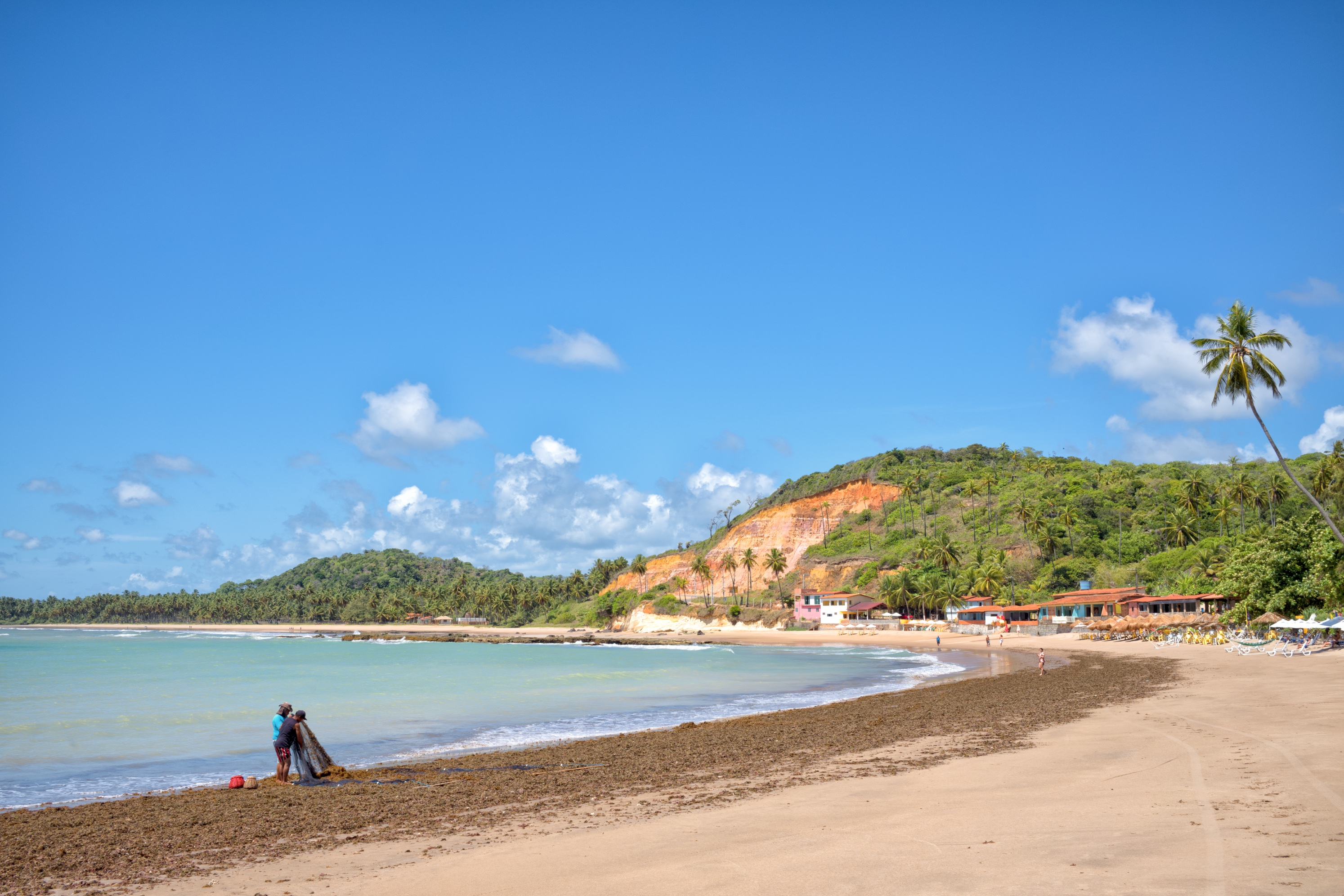
Barreiras do Boqueirão Beach

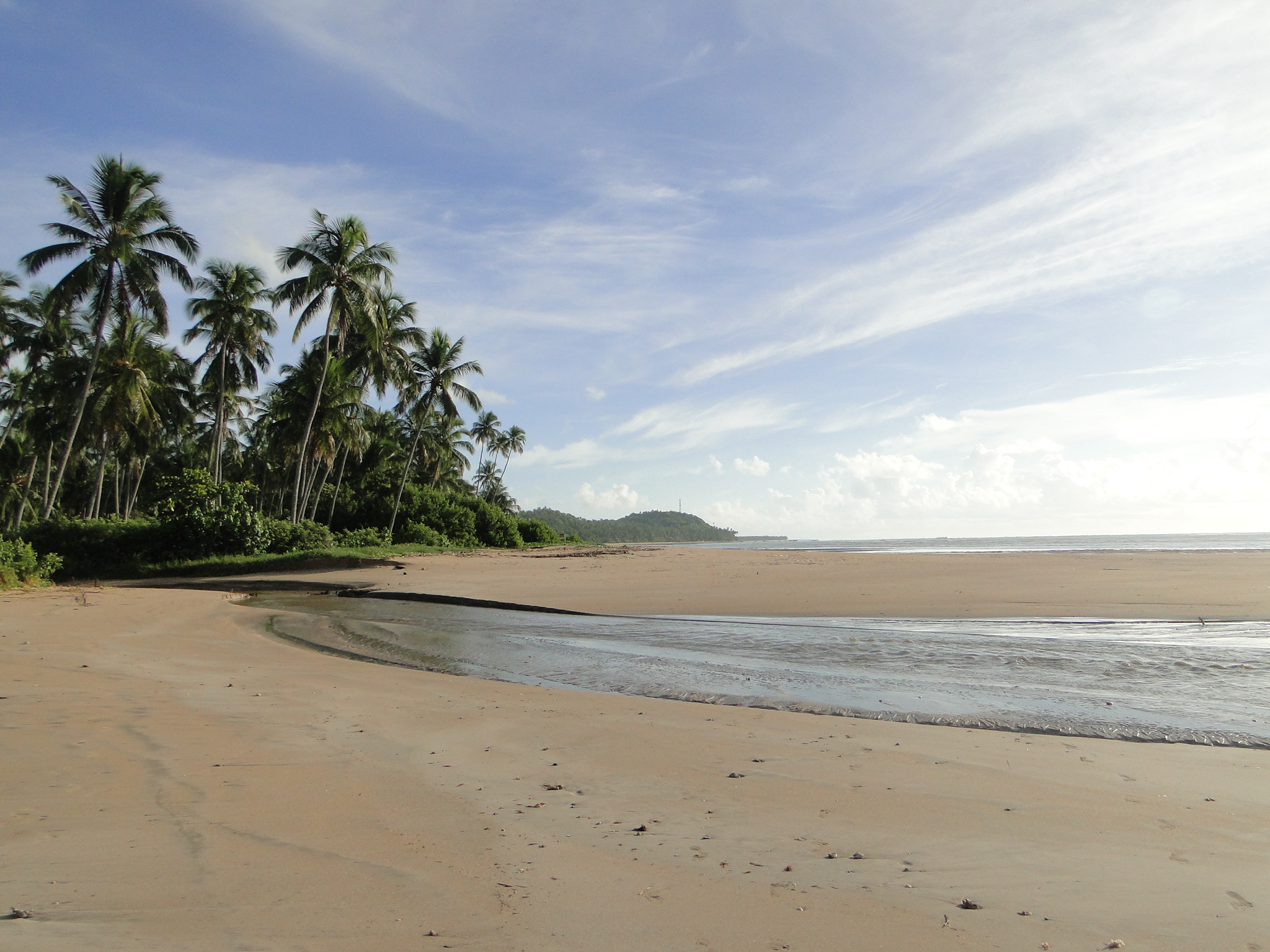
Beach in Japaratinga

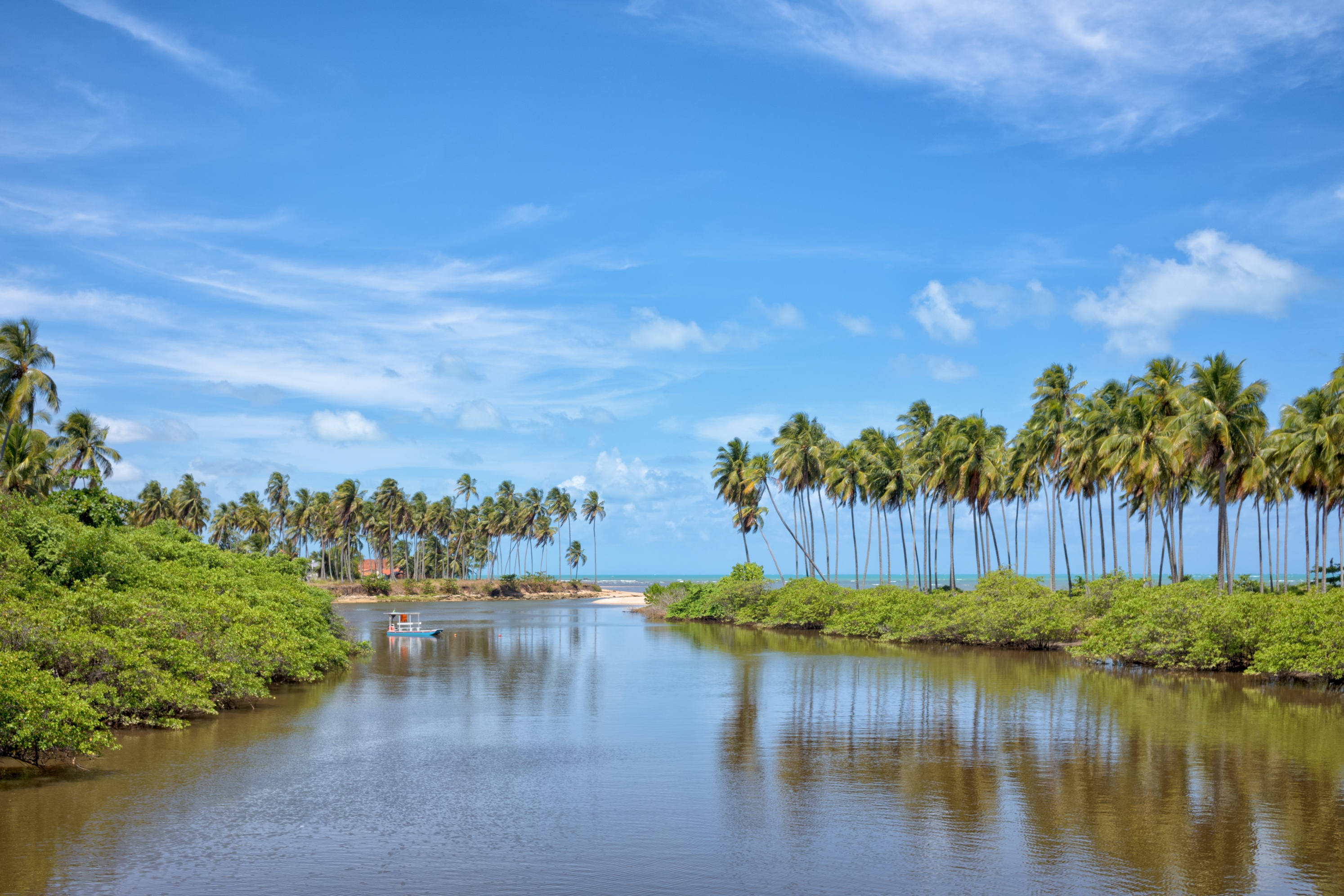
Border between Japaratinga and Maragogi

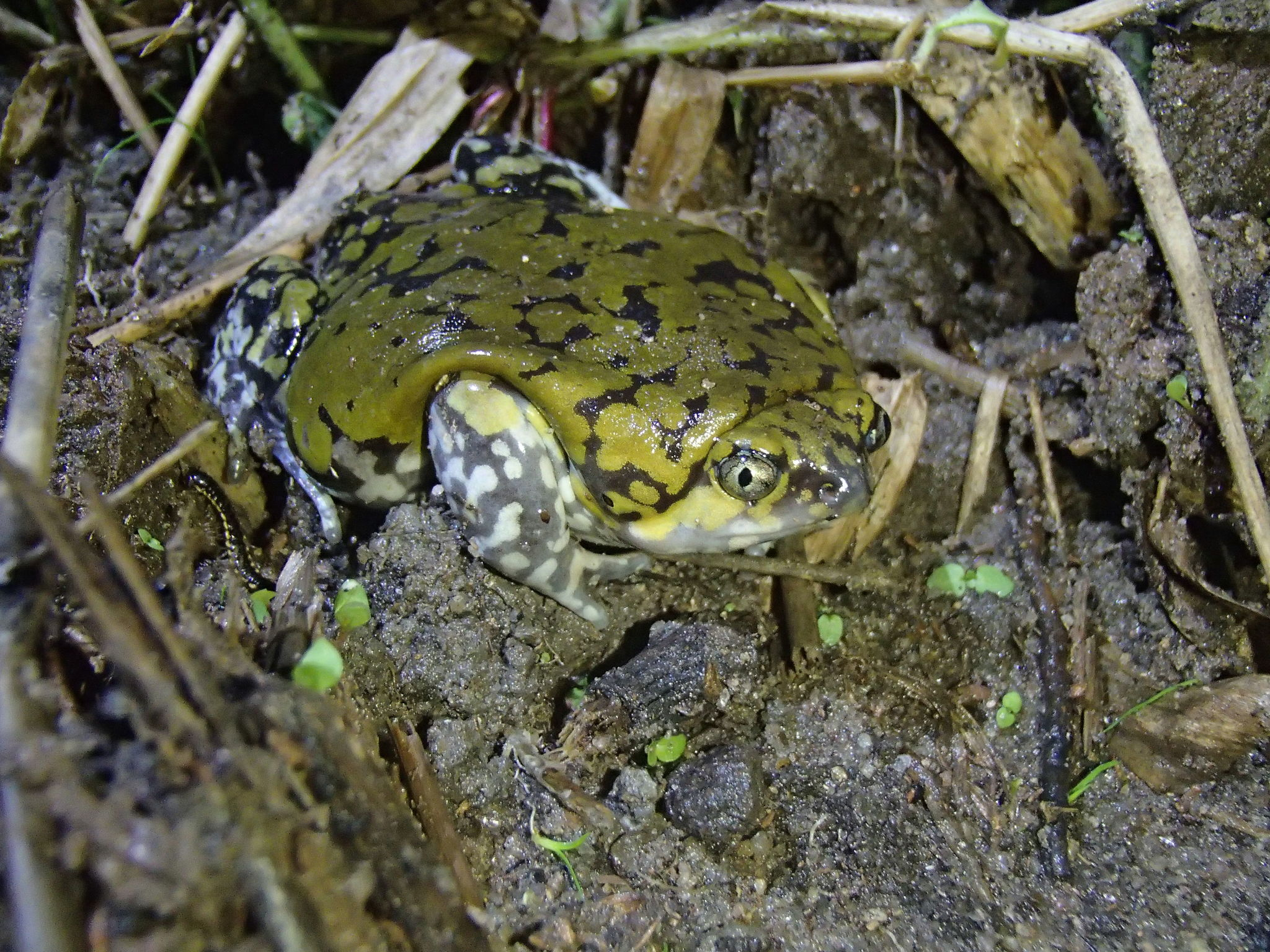
Adult Dermatonotus muelleri frog in Japaratinga

== See also ==
- List of municipalities in Alagoas
