= Jacuípe =

Municipality in Alagoas, Brazil

- Municipality of Alagoas, Brazil
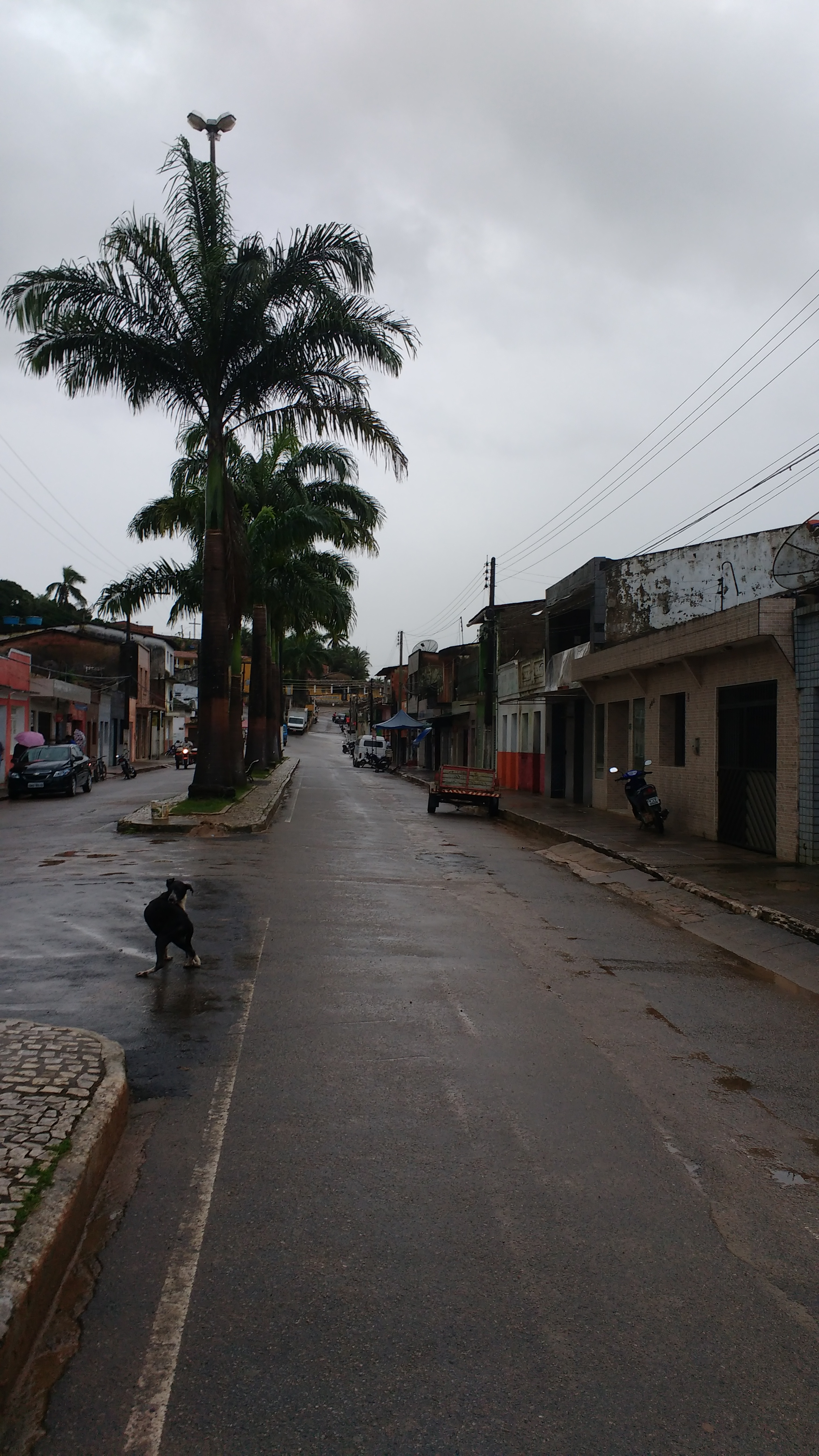
- Downtown Jacuípe

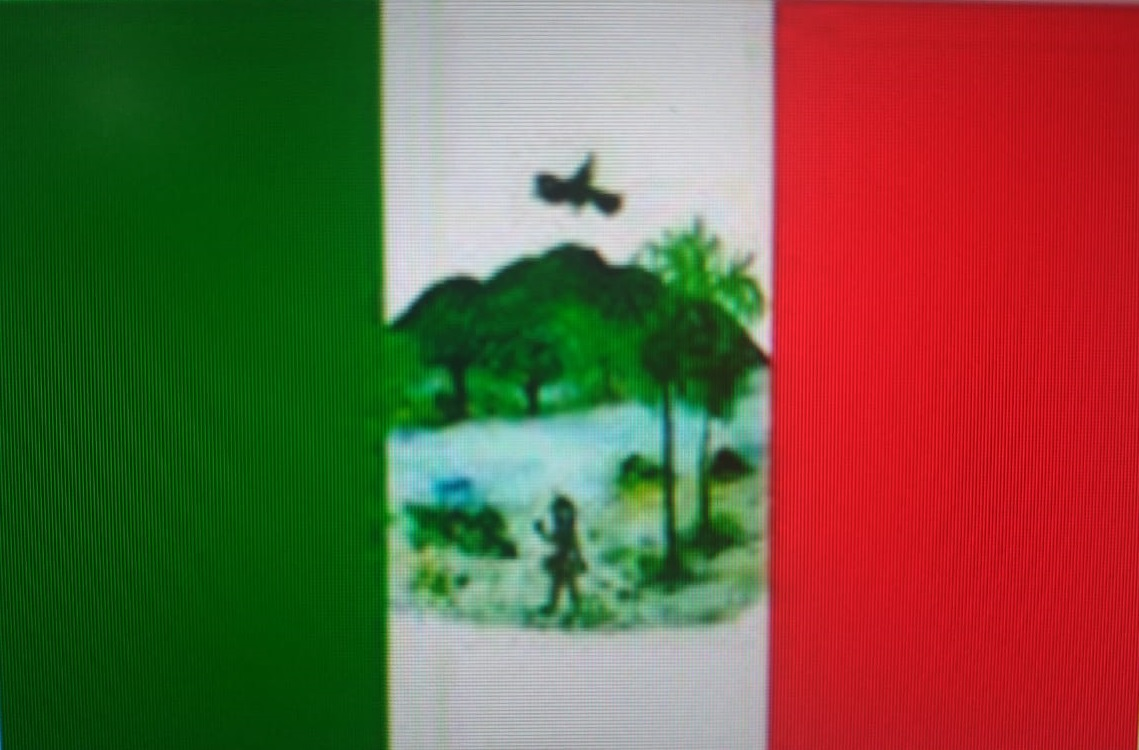
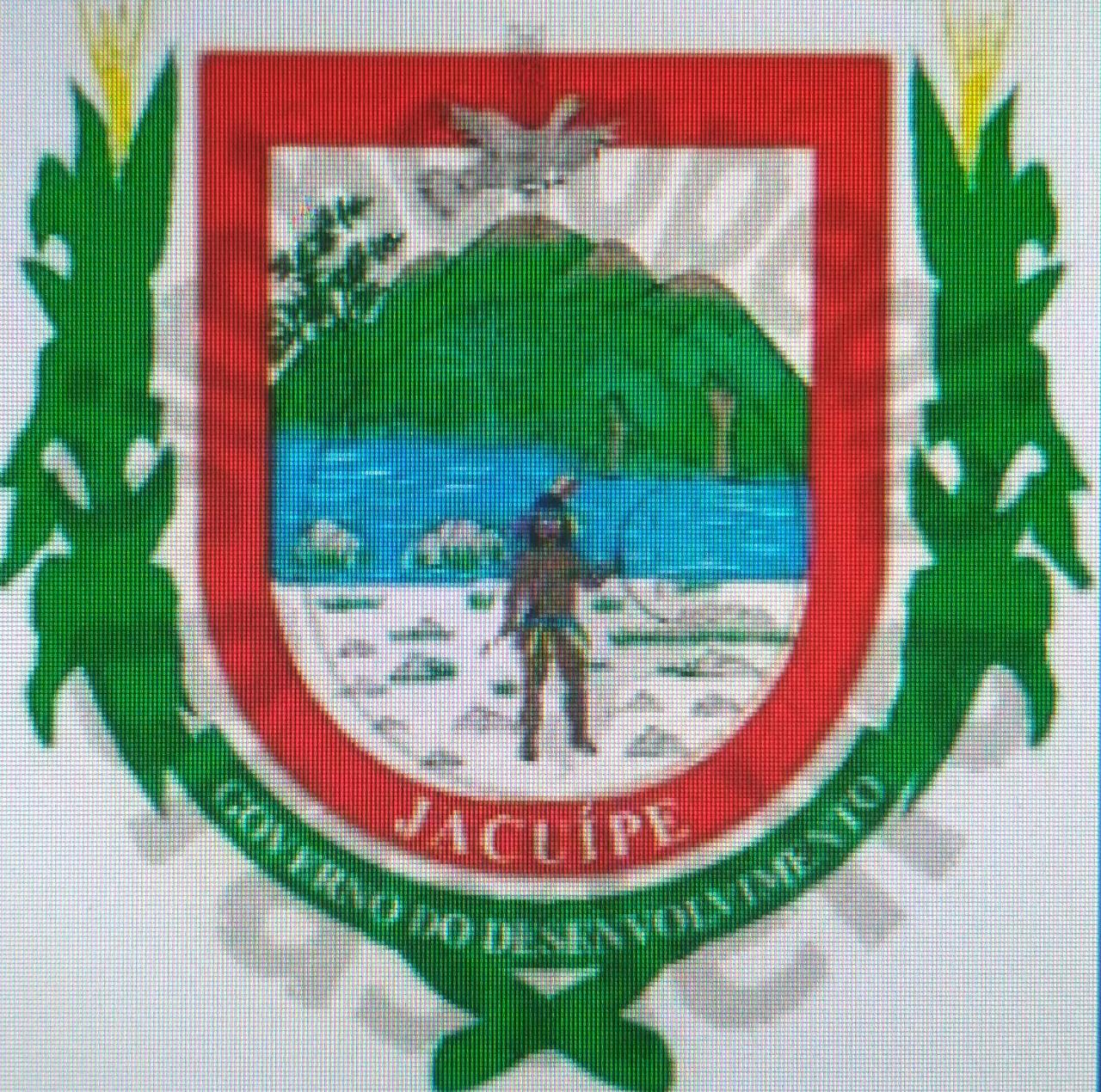
- Flag Coat of arms
- Etymology: Named after the Jacuípe River
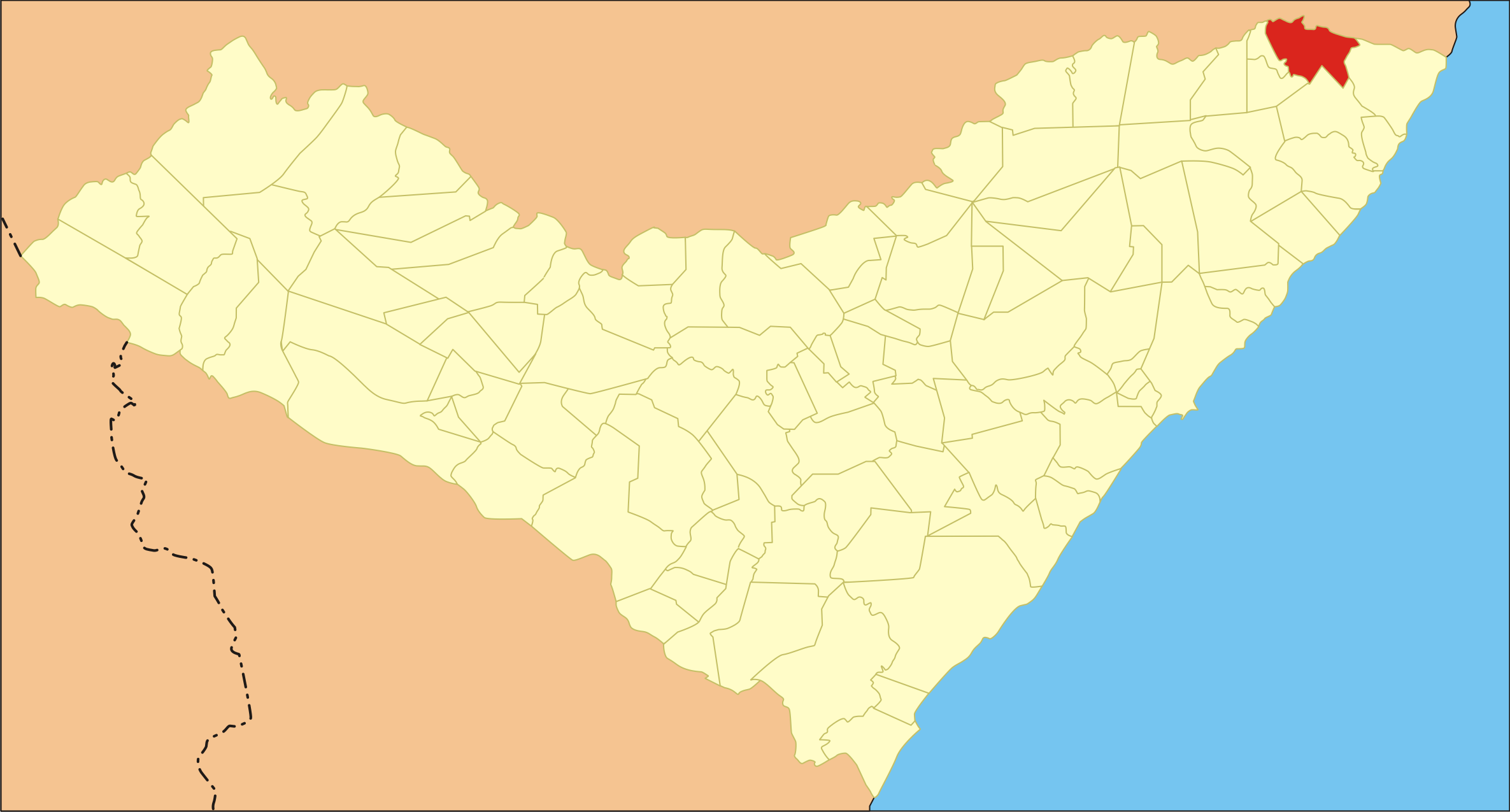
- Location of Jacuípe in Alagoas

- Location within Brazil Location within South America
- Coordinates: 8°50′31″S 35°27′36″W
- Country: Brazil
- Region: Northeast
- State: Alagoas
- Founded: 15 July 1958

Government
  - Mayor: Mayara Cristina Cavalcante de Freitas (MDB) (2025-2028)
  - Vice Mayor: Jose Severino da Silva (Republicanos) (2025-2028)

Area
  - Total: 208.738 km^{2} (80.594 sq mi)
- Elevation: 200 m (660 ft)

Population (2022)
  - Total: 5,352
  - Density: 25.64/km^{2} (66.4/sq mi)
- Demonym: Jacuipense (Brazilian Portuguese)
- Time zone: UTC-03:00 (Brasília Time)
- Postal code: 57960-000
- HDI (2010): 0.548 – low
- Website: jacuipe.al.gov.br

Jacuípe (Central northeastern portuguese pronunciation: [ʒakuˈipi]) is a municipality located in the Brazilian state of Alagoas. Its population is 5,352 (2022) and its area is 217 km^{2} (84 sq mi).

== See also ==
- List of municipalities in Alagoas
