= Piauí River =

Piauí River may refer to:

- Piauí River (Piauí)
- Piauí River (Alagoas)
- Piauí River (Minas Gerais)
- Piauí River (Sergipe)
