= List of rivers of Alagoas =

List of rivers in Alagoas (Brazilian State).

The list is arranged by drainage basin from north to south, with respective tributaries indented under each larger stream's name and ordered from downstream to upstream. All rivers in Alagoas drain to the Atlantic Ocean.

== By Drainage Basin ==
- Uná River (Pernambuco)
  - Jacuípe River
- Persinunga River
- Salgado River
- Manguaba River
- Tatuamunha River
- Camaragibe River
- Santo Antônio Grande River
  - Jirituba River
- Meirim River
- Prataji River
- Mundaú River
  - Satuba River
  - Cutanji River
  - Canhoto River
    - Inhumas River
- Paraíba River
  - Paraibinha River
- São Miguel River
- Jequiá River
- Coruripe River
- São Francisco River
  - Marituba River
    - Piauí River
  - Perucaba River
  - Boacica River
  - Cafundó River (Itiúba River)
  - Traipu River
  - Ipanema River
  - Jacaré River
  - Capiá River
  - Moxotó River

== Alphabetically ==
- Boacica River
- Cafundó River (Itiúba River)
- Camaragibe River
- Canhoto River
- Capiá River
- Coruripe River
- Cutanji River
- Inhumas River
- Ipanema River
- Jacaré River
- Jacuípe River
- Jequiá River
- Jirituba River
- Manguaba River
- Marituba River
- Meirim River
- Moxotó River
- Mundaú River
- Paraíba River
- Paraibinha River
- Persinuga River
- Perucaba River
- Piauí River
- Prataji River
- Salgado River
- Santo Antônio Grande River
- São Francisco River
- São Miguel River
- Satuba River
- Tatuamunha River
- Traipu River
