= Cafundó =

Cafundó may refer to:

- Cafundó language
- Cafundó River
- Cafundó, São Paulo
- Cafundó (film), a 2005 Brazilian historical drama film starring Lázaro Ramos.
