= Inhumas River =

River in Alagoas & Pernambuco, Brazil

Location
- Country: Brazil

Physical characteristics
- Source
  - location: Pernambuco state
- Mouth: Canhoto River
  - location: Alagoas state
  - coordinates: 9°3′S 36°5′W

The Inhumas or Inhaúma River is a river of Alagoas and Pernambuco states in eastern Brazil. It is the main tributary of the Canhoto River.

== See also ==
- List of rivers of Alagoas
- List of rivers of Pernambuco
