= Jacuípe River =

There are several rivers named Jacuípe River in Brazil:

- Jacuípe River (Bahia)
- Jacuípe River (Paraíba), a river of Paraíba
- Jacuípe River (Pernambuco)
