= Jirituba River =

Location
- Country: Brazil

Physical characteristics
- Source
  - location: Alagoas state
- Mouth: Santo Antônio Grande River
  - coordinates: 9°21′S 35°32′W

Jirituba River is a river of Alagoas state in eastern Brazil.

== See also ==
- List of rivers of Alagoas
