= Paraibinha River =

Paraibinha River may refer to:

- Paraibinha River (Alagoas), Brazil
- Paraibinha River (Paraíba), a river of Paraíba, Brazil

== See also ==
- Parnaìbinha River, a river of Maranhão, Brazil
