= Boacica River =

Coordinates: 10°15′36″S 36°35′59″W

Location
- Country: Brazil

Physical characteristics
- Source
  - location: Alagoas state

Boacica River is a river of Alagoas state in eastern Brazil.

== See also ==
- List of rivers of Alagoas
