= Perucaba River =

Location
- Country: Brazil

Physical characteristics
- Source
  - location: Alagoas state
- Mouth: São Francisco River
  - coordinates: 10°19′S 36°34′W

Perucaba River is a river of Alagoas state in eastern Brazil.

== See also ==
- List of rivers of Alagoas
