= Piauí River (Alagoas) =

Location
- Country: Brazil

Physical characteristics
- Source
  - location: Alagoas state
- Mouth: Marituba River
  - coordinates: 10°10′S 36°20′W

Piauí River is a river of Alagoas state in eastern Brazil.

== See also ==
- List of rivers of Alagoas
