= São Miguel River (Alagoas) =

River in Alagoas, Brazil

- Location of mouth

Location
- Country: Brazil
- State: Alagoas

Physical characteristics
- Source
  - location: Alagoas state
- Mouth: Atlantic Ocean
  - coordinates: 9°51′S 35°54′W

São Miguel River is a river of Alagoas state in eastern Brazil.

== See also ==
- List of rivers of Alagoas
