= Cutanji River =

Location
- Country: Brazil

Physical characteristics
- Source
  - location: Alagoas state
- Mouth: Mundaú River
  - coordinates: 9°21′S 35°54′W

Cutanji River is a river in the state of Alagoas in eastern Brazil.

== See also ==
- List of rivers of Alagoas
