= Traipu River =

Coordinates: 9°58′20″S 37°00′40″W

Location
- Country: Brazil

Physical characteristics
- Source
  - location: Pernambuco state

Traipu River is a river of Alagoas and Pernambuco states in eastern Brazil.

== See also ==
- List of rivers of Alagoas
- List of rivers of Pernambuco
