= Meirim River =

River in Alagoas, Brazil

- Location of mouth

Location
- Country: Brazil
- State: Alagoas

Physical characteristics
- Source
  - location: Alagoas state
- Mouth
  - location: Atlantic Ocean
  - coordinates: 9°32′51″S 35°37′07″W

Meirim River is a river of Alagoas state in eastern Brazil.

== See also ==
- List of rivers of Alagoas
