= Passo de Camaragibe =

Municipality of Alagoas, Brazil

- Municipality of Alagoas, Brazil
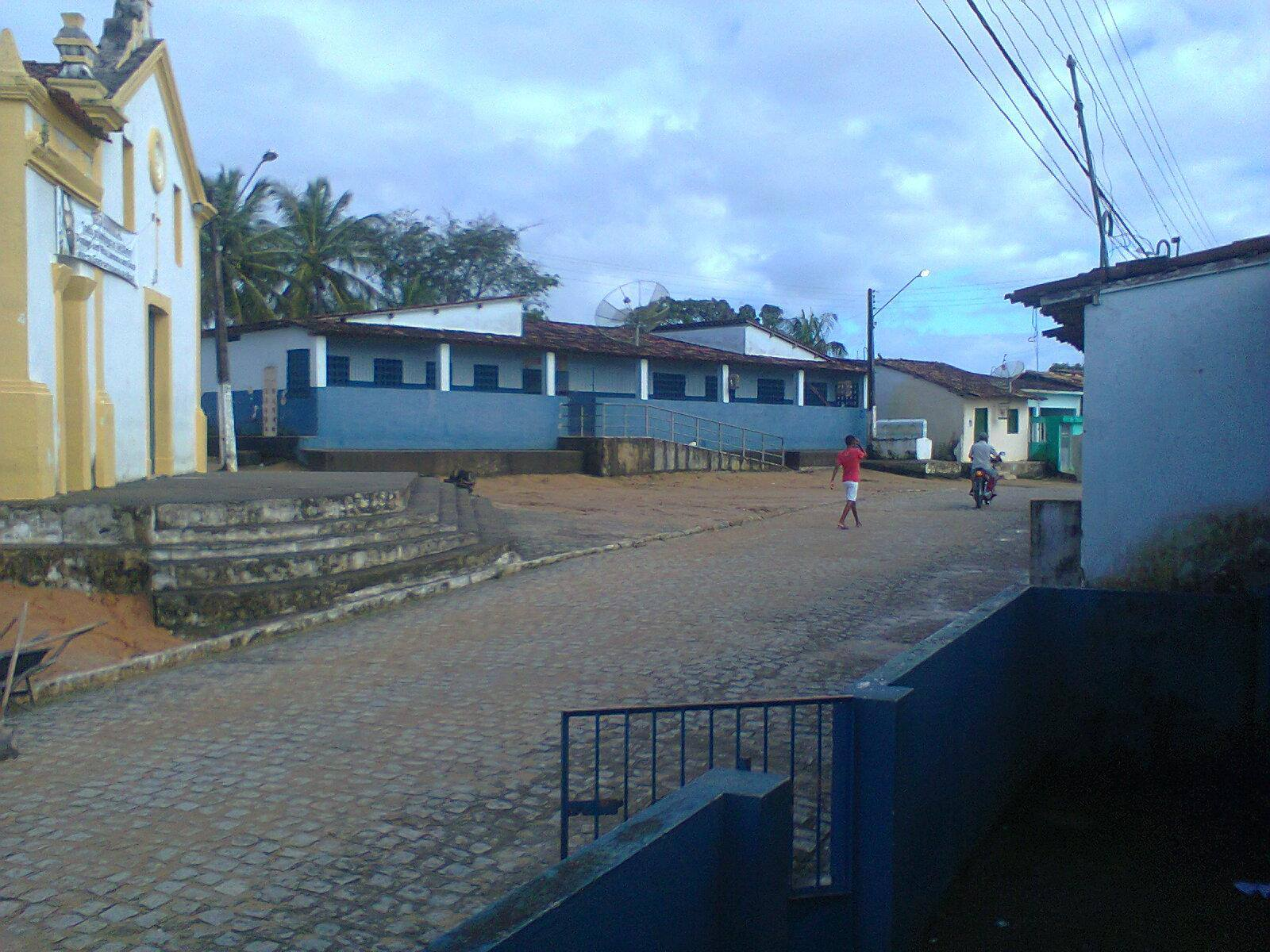
- Bom Despacho Village with Our Lady of Candeias church
- Etymology: Named after the shipping warehouses, passos, on the Camaragibe River
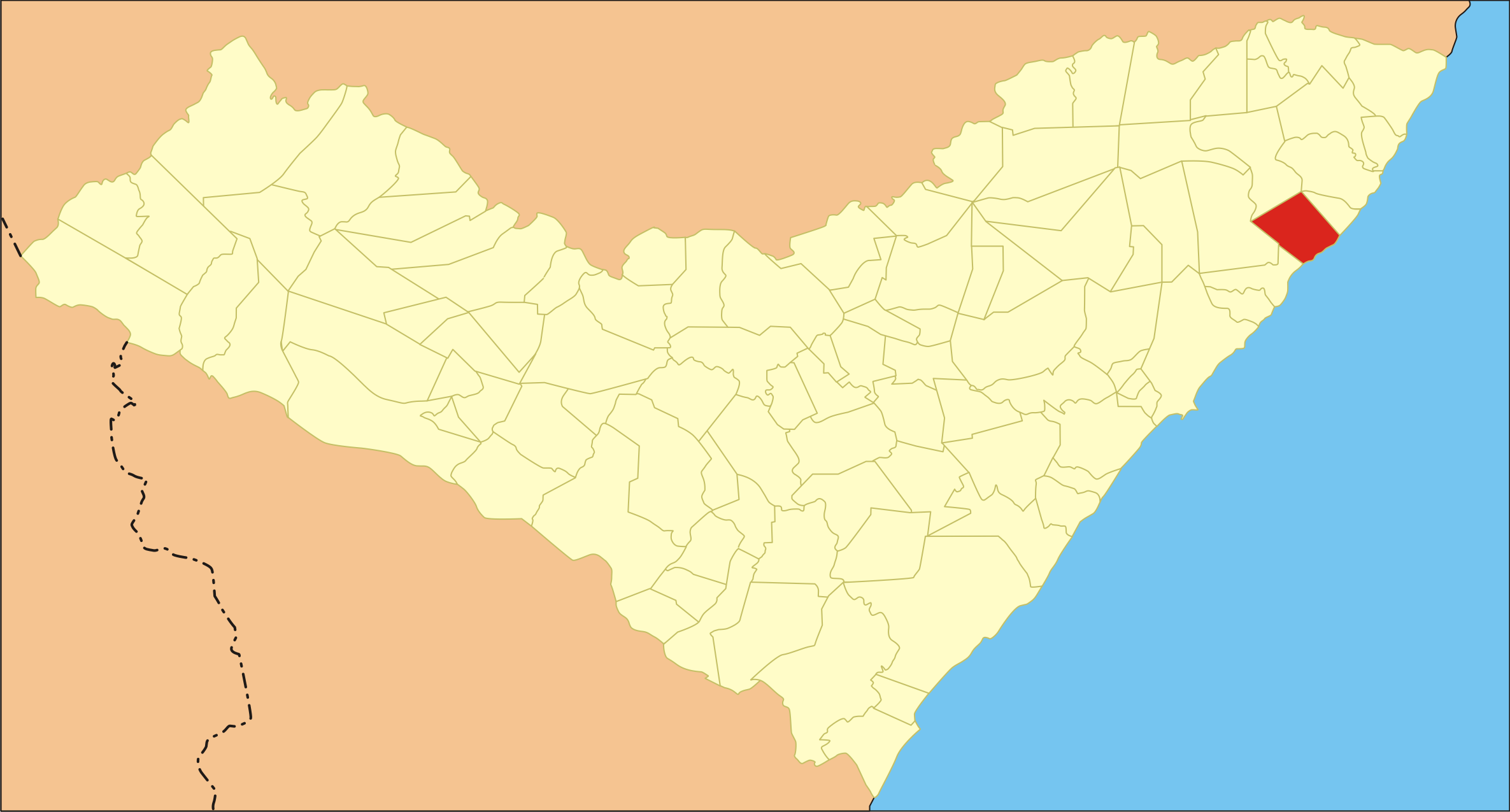
- Location of Passo de Camaragibe in Alagoas

- Location within Brazil Location within South America
- Coordinates: 9°14′16″S 35°29′34″W
- Country: Brazil
- Region: Northeast
- State: Alagoas
- Founded: 24 April 1958

Government
  - Mayor: Ellisson Santos da Silva (Republicanos) (2025-2028)
  - Vice Mayor: Adeildo Petrúcio dos Santos (Republicanos) (2025-2028)

Area
  - Total: 251.290 km^{2} (97.024 sq mi)
- Elevation: 2 m (6.6 ft)

Population (2022)
  - Total: 13,804
  - Density: 54.93/km^{2} (142.3/sq mi)
- Demonym: Camaragibense (Brazilian Portuguese)
- Time zone: UTC-03:00 (Brasília Time)
- Postal code: 57930-000
- HDI (2010): 0.533 – low
- Website: passodecamaragibe.al.gov.br

Passo de Camaragibe (Central northeastern portuguese pronunciation: [ˈpasʊ ˈdi kɐmɐɾɐˈʒiːbi]) is a municipality located in the northern coast of the Brazilian state of Alagoas. Its population is 15,258 (2020) and its area is 187 km^{2}.

== See also ==
- List of municipalities in Alagoas
