= Persinunga River =

Location
- Country: Brazil

Physical characteristics
- Source
  - location: Alagoas state
- Mouth: Atlantic Ocean
  - coordinates: 8°54′S 35°9′W

Persinunga River is a river along the border between Alagoas and Pernambuco states in eastern Brazil.

== See also ==
- List of rivers of Alagoas
- List of rivers of Pernambuco
