= Coruripe River =

River in Alagoas, Brazil

- Location of mouth

Location
- Country: Brazil
- State: Alagoas

Physical characteristics
- Source
  - location: Alagoas state
- Mouth
  - location: Atlantic Ocean
  - coordinates: 10°09′30″S 36°09′03″W

Coruripe River is a river of Alagoas state in eastern Brazil.

== See also ==
- List of rivers of Alagoas
