= Canhoto River =

Location
- Country: Brazil

Physical characteristics
- Source
  - location: Alagoas state
- Mouth: Mundaú River
  - coordinates: 9°6′S 36°5′W

The Canhoto River is a river of Pernambuco and Alagoas states in eastern Brazil. It is the main tributary of the Mundaú River.

== See also ==
- List of rivers of Alagoas
- List of rivers of Pernambuco
