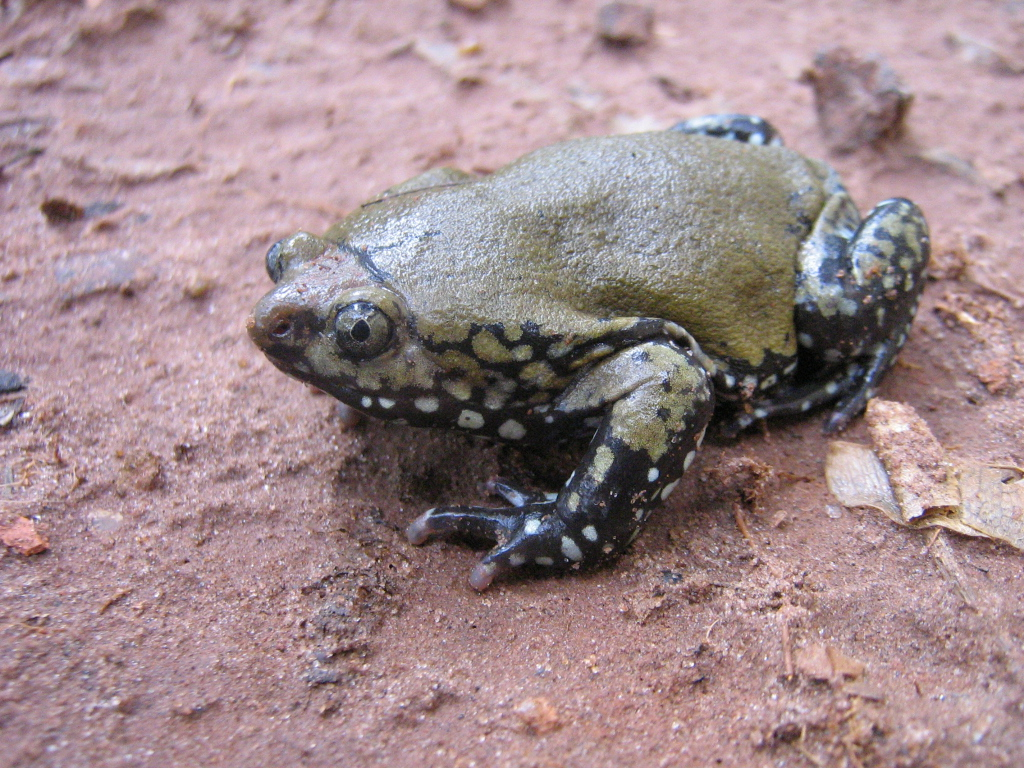

Conservation status
- Least Concern (IUCN 3.1)

Scientific classification
- Kingdom: Animalia
- Phylum: Chordata
- Class: Amphibia
- Order: Anura
- Family: Microhylidae
- Subfamily: Gastrophryninae
- Genus: Dermatonotus; Méhely, 1904
- Species: D. muelleri

Binomial name
- Dermatonotus muelleri (Boettger, 1885)

= Dermatonotus =

Genus of amphibians

Dermatonotus is a genus of frogs in the family Microhylidae. It is monotypic, being represented by the single species, Dermatonotus muelleri, commonly known as Muller's termite frog. It is found in Argentina, Bolivia, Brazil, and Paraguay.

Dermatonotus muelleri has a stout body, reaching about 40–50 mm (1.6–2.0 in) in snout–vent length. Females are larger than males. It lives below ground, feeding on termites. It is an explosive breeder.

Dermatonotus muelleri is locally abundant, but it is threatened by habitat loss in parts of its range. It is sometimes collected for international pet trade.
