= Tatuamunha River =

River in Alagoas, Brazil

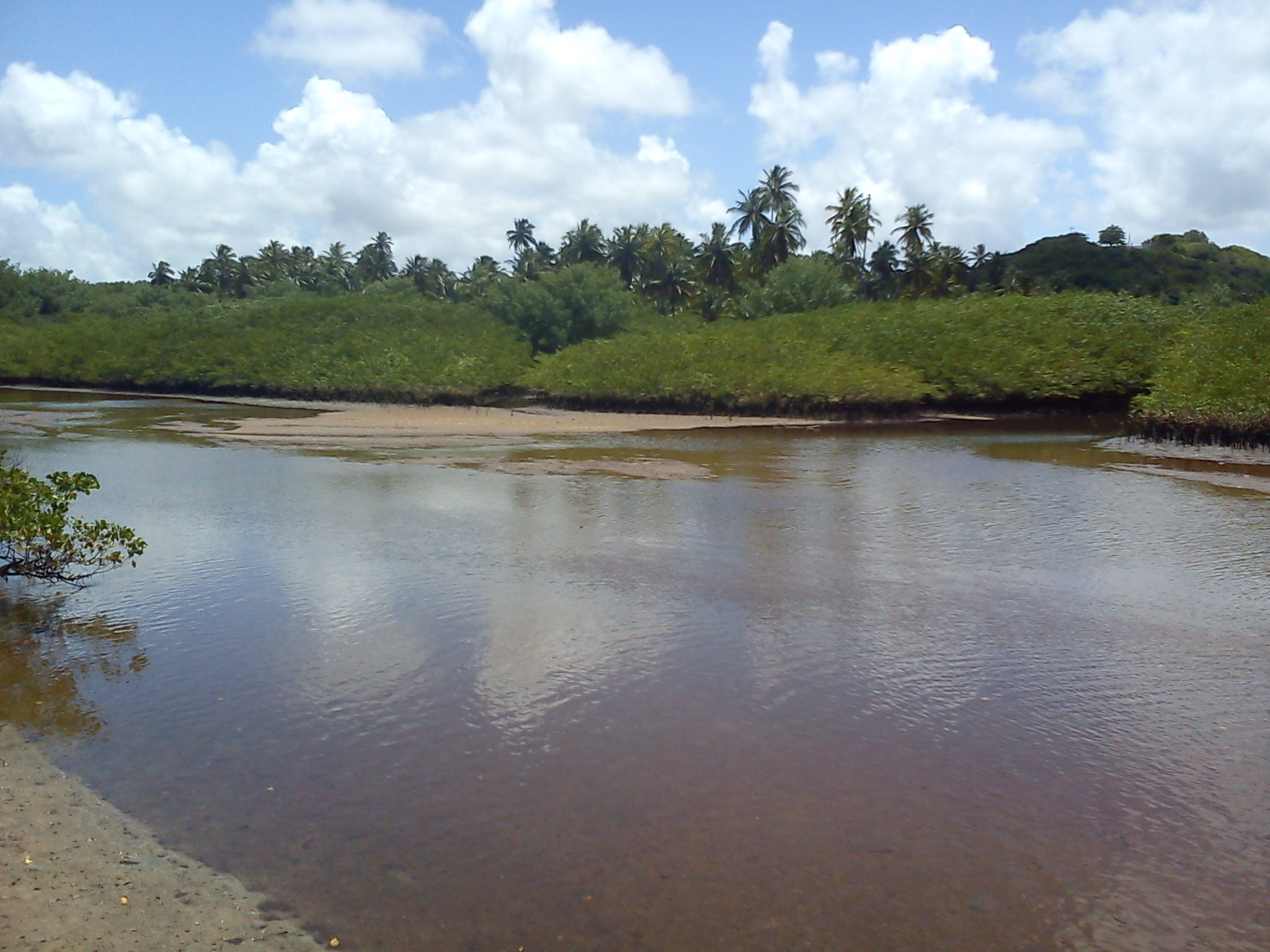

- Location of mouth

Location
- Country: Brazil
- State: Alagoas

Physical characteristics
- Source
  - location: Alagoas state
- Mouth: Atlantic Ocean
  - coordinates: 9°14′S 35°21′W
  - elevation: 0 m (0 ft)

Tatuamunha River is a river of Alagoas state in eastern Brazil. It flows into the Atlantic Ocean at the eponymous Tatuamunha in Porto de Pedras.

== See also ==
- List of rivers of Alagoas
