= Camaragibe River =

River in eastern Brazil

Location
- Country: Brazil

Physical characteristics
- Source
  - location: Alagoas state
- Mouth: Atlantic Ocean
  - coordinates: 9°18′S 35°27′W

Camaragibe River is a river in Alagoas state in eastern Brazil. It flows into the Atlantic Ocean in Passo de Camaragibe municipality.

== See also ==
- List of rivers of Alagoas
