= Manguaba River =

River in Alagoas, Brazil

- Location of mouth

Location
- Country: Brazil
- State: Alagoas

Physical characteristics
- Source
  - location: Alagoas state
- Mouth: Atlantic Ocean
  - location: Porto de Pedras
  - coordinates: 9°9′S 35°18′W
  - elevation: 0 m (0 ft)

The Manguaba River is a river of Alagoas state in eastern Brazil. It flows into the Atlantic Ocean at Porto de Pedras.

== See also ==
- List of rivers of Alagoas
