= Jacuípe River (Pernambuco) =

Location
- Country: Brazil

Physical characteristics
- Source
  - location: Alagoas state
- Mouth: Una River
  - coordinates: 8°49′S 35°24′W

The Jacuípe River is a river along the border between Alagoas and Pernambuco states in eastern Brazil. It flows into the Una River on the border of Barreiros and Água Preta municipalities in the latter state.

== See also ==
- List of rivers of Alagoas
- List of rivers of Pernambuco
