= Santo Antônio Grande River =

Coordinates: 9°25′S 35°31′W

Location
- Country: Brazil

Physical characteristics
- Source
  - location: Alagoas state

Santo Antônio Grande River is a river of Alagoas state in eastern Brazil. It is a tributary of the Jacuipe River.

== See also ==
- List of rivers of Alagoas
