= Cafundó River =

Location
- Country: Brazil

Physical characteristics
- Source
  - location: Alagoas state
- Mouth: São Francisco River
  - location: Porto Real do Colégio
  - coordinates: 10°12′S 36°47′W

The Cafundó River, also known as the Itiúba River, is a river of Alagoas state in eastern Brazil. It is a tributary of the São Francisco River.
