= Maragogi =

Municipality of Alagoas, Brazil

- Municipality
- The Municipality of Maragogi
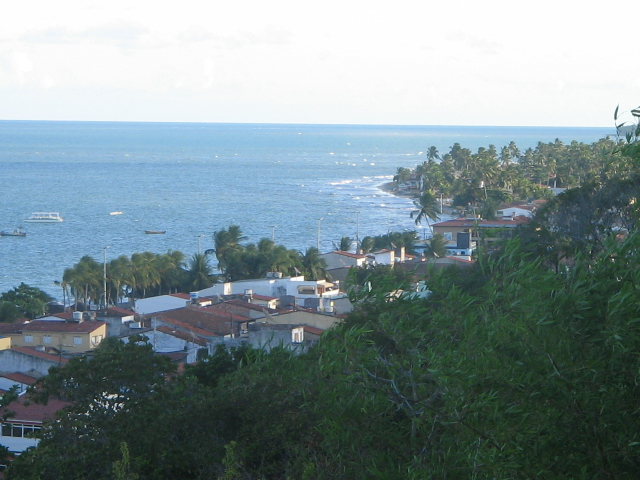
- Maragogi Downtown

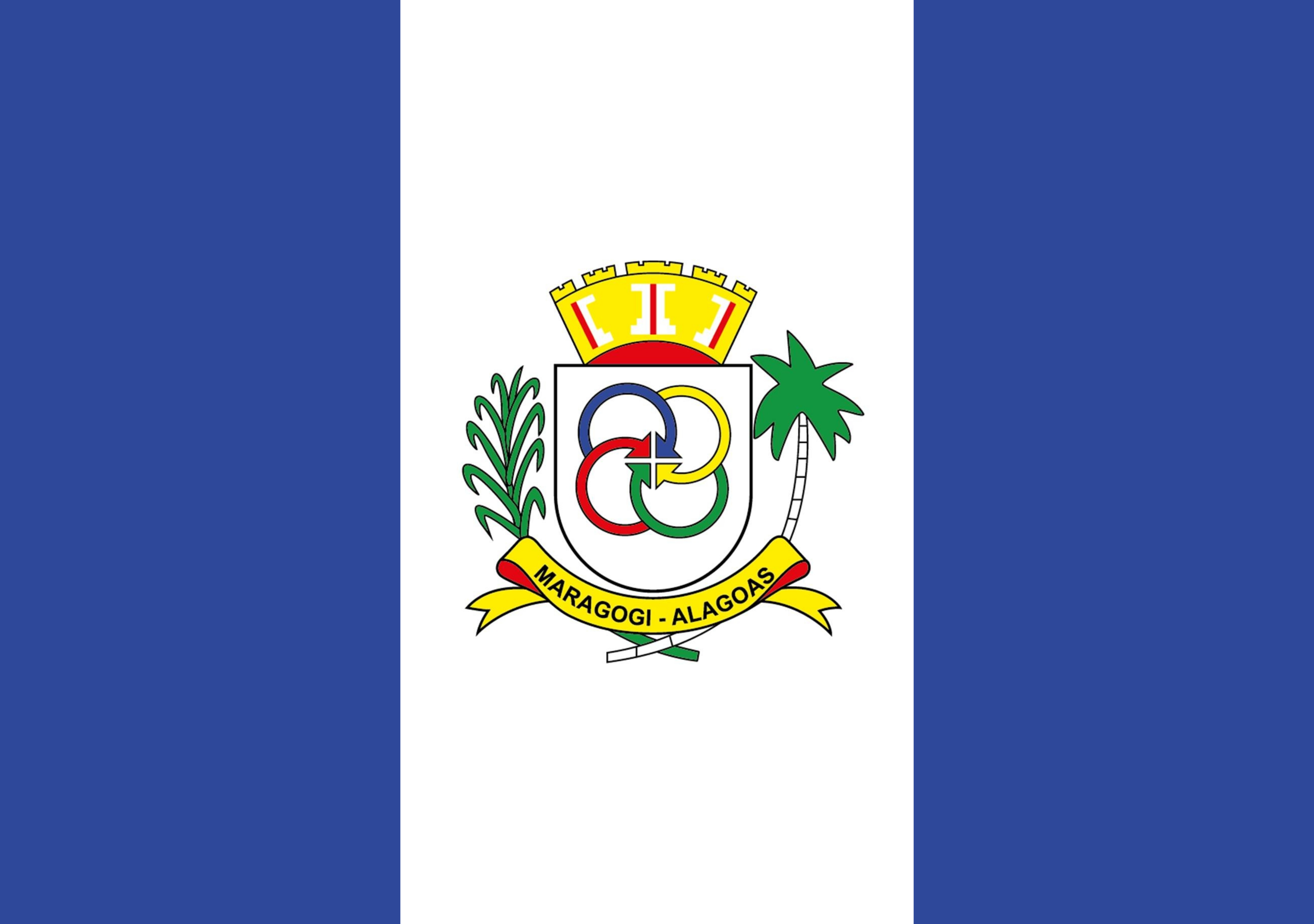
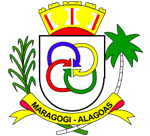
- Flag Coat of arms
- Nickname: Maragogi: Um Paraíso em Alagoas
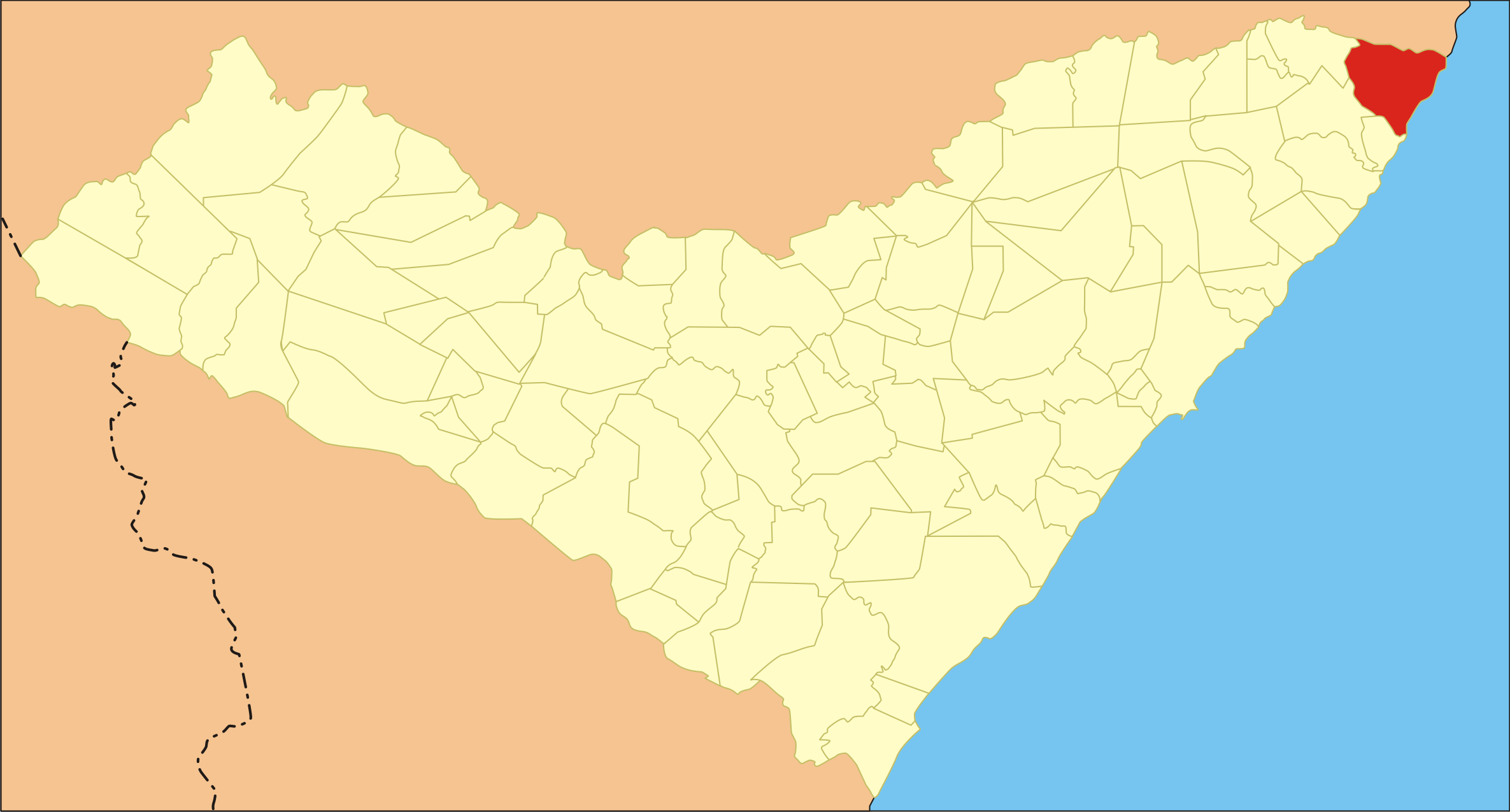
- Location of Maragogi in the State of Alagoas

- Location in Brazil
- Coordinates: 09°00′44″S 35°13′21″W
- Country: Brazil
- Region: Northeast
- State: Alagoas
- Founded: April 24, 1875

Government
  - Mayor: Sergio Lira

Area
  - Total: 335 km^{2} (129 sq mi)
- Elevation: 5 m (16 ft)

Population (2020 est)
  - Total: 33,032
  - Density: 75.322/km^{2} (195.08/sq mi)
- Time zone: UTC−3 (BRT)
- HDI (2000): 0.619 – medium
- Website: Official website (at 2012-11-25 the official website address above is being used by an advertising agency business) www.prefeiturademaragogi.com (at 2012-11-25 the unofficial website address above appears to be functioning as a website for the municipality)

Maragogi (Central northeastern portuguese pronunciation: [mɐɾɐɡoˈʒi]) is a municipality in the Brazilian state of Alagoas, 125 km north of the capital city of Maceió. It has 33,032 inhabitants, a city situated on the northern coast of Alagoas state, Brazil, being the easternmost city of that state.

As the main destination in the State of Alagoas after its capital city, Maragogi attracts visitors from Maceió. From Japaratinga beach, on the southern tip, a ferryboat crosses Manguaba River into Porto das Pedras, where visitors find virtually deserted beaches. Maragogi was initially a small village called Gamela. In 1887, it was granted the status of an adopted the name of Isabel, to honor the Brazilian Princess who signed a law ending slavery in Brazil. Later on, in 1892, it was named as Maragogi after the river that baths the city. "Maragogi", according to some historians, comes from “Marahub-gy”, or river of the Marauba tribes.

== Geography ==
=== Climate ===
Maragogi has a typical tropical climate, with warm to hot temperatures and high relative humidity all throughout the year. However, these conditions are relieved by a near absence of extreme temperatures and trade winds blowing from the ocean. January is the warmest month, with mean maxima of 31 °C and minima of 22 °C and more sun; July experiences the coolest temperatures, with means of 26 °C and 17 °C and more rain.

=== Vegetation ===
Maragogi has a tropical forest. Rainforests are characterized by high rainfall, with definitions setting minimum normal annual rainfall between 2,000 mm (about 78 inches or 2 meters) and 1700 mm (about 67 inches). The soil can be poor because high rainfall tends to leach out soluble nutrients. There are several common characteristics of tropical rainforest trees. Tropical rainforest species frequently possess one or more of the following attributes not commonly seen in trees of higher latitudes or trees in drier conditions on the same latitude.

== Demographics ==
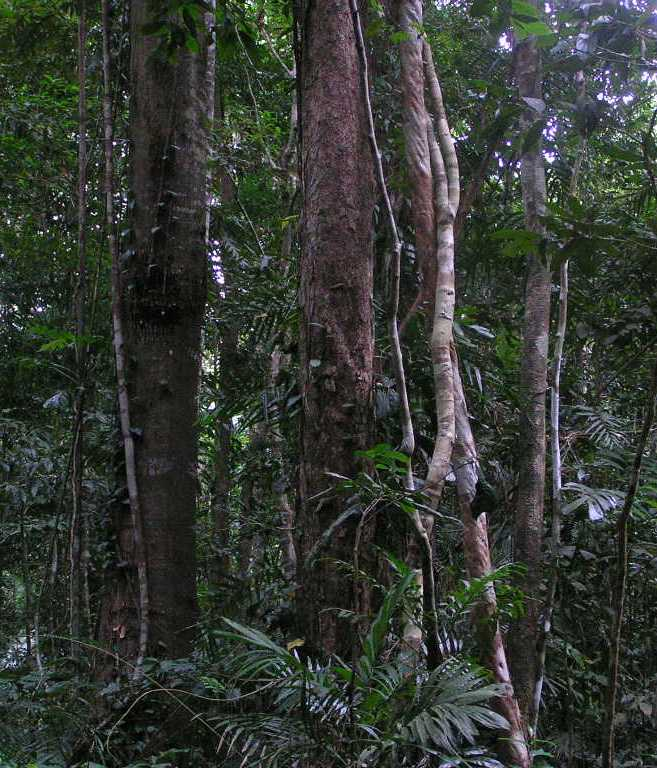
The Zona da Mata in Alagoas State. High population density.

As of the census of 2007, the population was 25,726 hab. The estimated population in 2020 is 33,032.

=== Maragogi ethnic groups ===
According to the 2007 census, the racial makeup of the city was:

- Majority White and Multiracial.
- Minority Black.

=== Maragogi demographics history ===
1. Amerindians, Brazil's indigenous population, came from human groups that migrated from Siberia across the Bering Strait around 9000 BC.

2. Portuguese colonists and settlers, arriving from 1500 onward.

3. Diverse groups of immigrants from Europe arriving in Maragogi during the late nineteenth and early twentieth centuries. And now, because of tourism.

4. African slaves brought to the country from 1530 until the end of the slave trade in 1850.

== Economy ==
=== Tourism ===
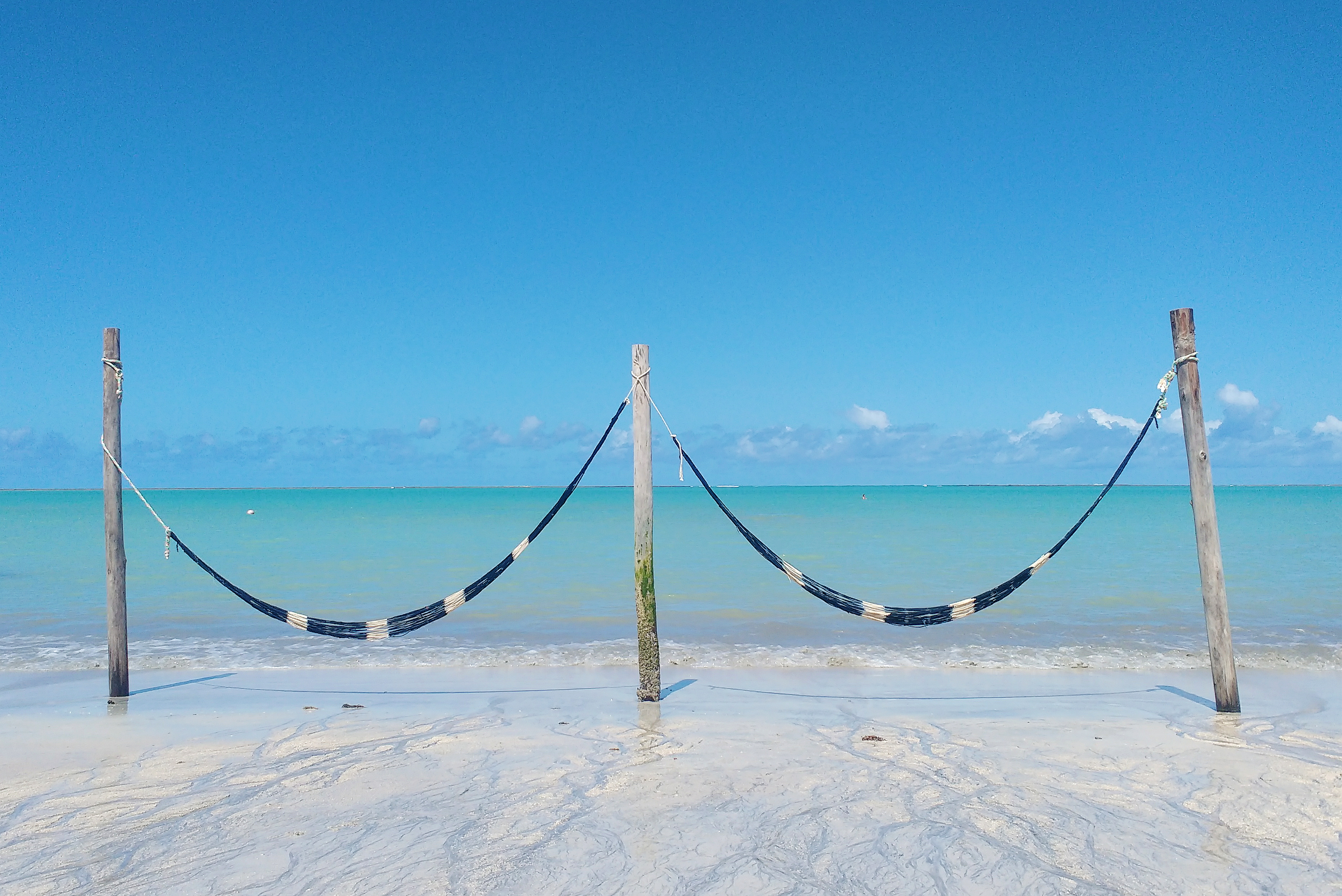
Barra Grande beach

Maragogi is located on the Coral Coast – Costa dos Corais – 130 kilometers of continuous living tropical reefs on the coast of Northeast Brazil. The municipality is the second most visited city after Maceio the state capital of Alagoas.

Its major attraction is the "Galés", a group of tropical pools formed at low tide about 6 kilometers from the city's beach. They are served by 15 large registered catamarans leaving from various points in the municipal area. Individual tours are also available.

In 2015 the city started to host sports events, with the launching of the first Trail Running competition on the region: the WINGSMAN Maragogi and then started to become the destination for adventure and outdoors tourism along with the traditional tourist looking for the best beaches in the country.

Maragogi's history includes the battles between Dutch and Portuguese colonizers as well as the growth of the sugar cane and coconut plantations that formed the first wealth of the region. Today, it is tourism that provides the most important economic impact in the region. But, its potential remains unexplored. Even so, the busy waterfront in the City of Maragogi has a variety of restaurants, stores and stalls selling local arts and crafts.

Trips to snorkel or scuba dive the reefs can be interspersed by excursions on the reefs themselves or a sail (or even fish) on the local "jangada" sailing rafts. The deserted beaches of Maragogi and other rural attractions can be accessed by renting beach buggies readily available at the hotels and pousadas.

=== Places of interest ===
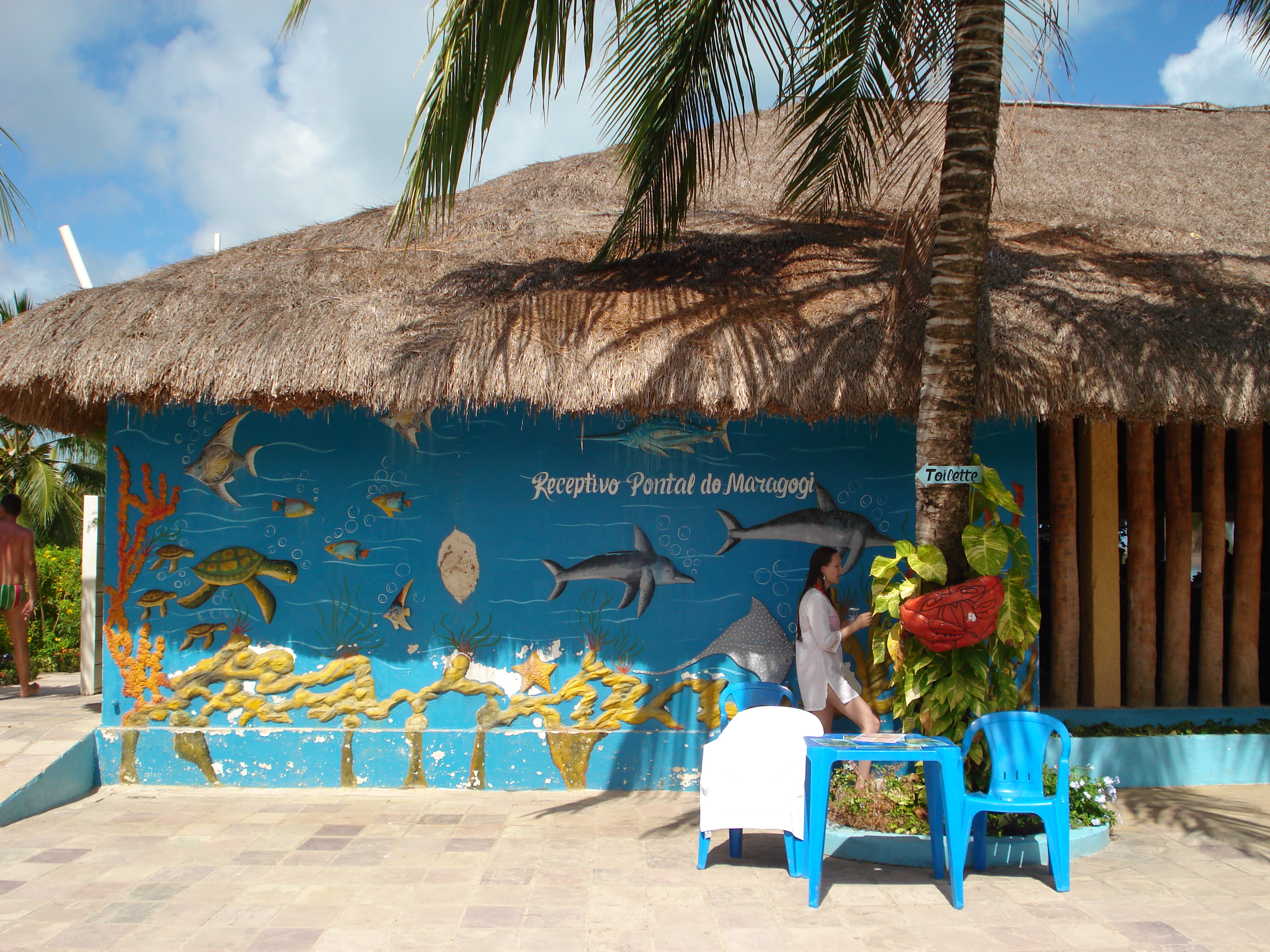
Tourism office at Maragogi Beach

==== Maragogi Beach ====
Beaches in Maragogi have calm waters, without strong waves, with coral reefs and fine sands. During low tide, sand banks emerge forming natural pools, known as Croas (5 km away from the coast) and Galés (6 km away). "Jangadas" and boats can take tourists to these pools. On the beach's southern tip, between Vila de Japaratinga and Pontal, visitors find the less urbanized beaches with 20-m high sea cliffs. Visitors can also go on a boat ride to coral reefs 6 km away from the coast. Maragogi beach is near Maragogi River, with calm waves, flat sands and coral reefs.

==== Nearby places ====
Porto de Galinhas (Pernambuco), Sao Miguel dos Milagres (Alagoas), Japaratinga (Alagoas)
