= Charqueada River =

River in Brazil

Location
- Country: Brazil

Physical characteristics
- Source
  - location: Paraná state
- Mouth: Imbaú River
  - coordinates: 24°28′55″S 50°40′53″W

The Charqueada River is a river of Paraná state in southern Brazil.

== See also ==
- List of rivers of Paraná
