= Da Areia River =

Da Areia River may refer to:

- Da Areia River (Goio-Ere River), a river of Paraná state in southern Brazil
- Da Areia River (Iguazu River), a river of Paraná state in southern Brazil
