= Bandeira River =

Bandeira River may refer to:

- Bandeira River (Chopim River), a river of Paraná state in southern Brazil
- Bandeira River (Piquiri River), a river of Paraná state in southern Brazil
