= Tião Bocalom =

Brazilian politician and mathematician

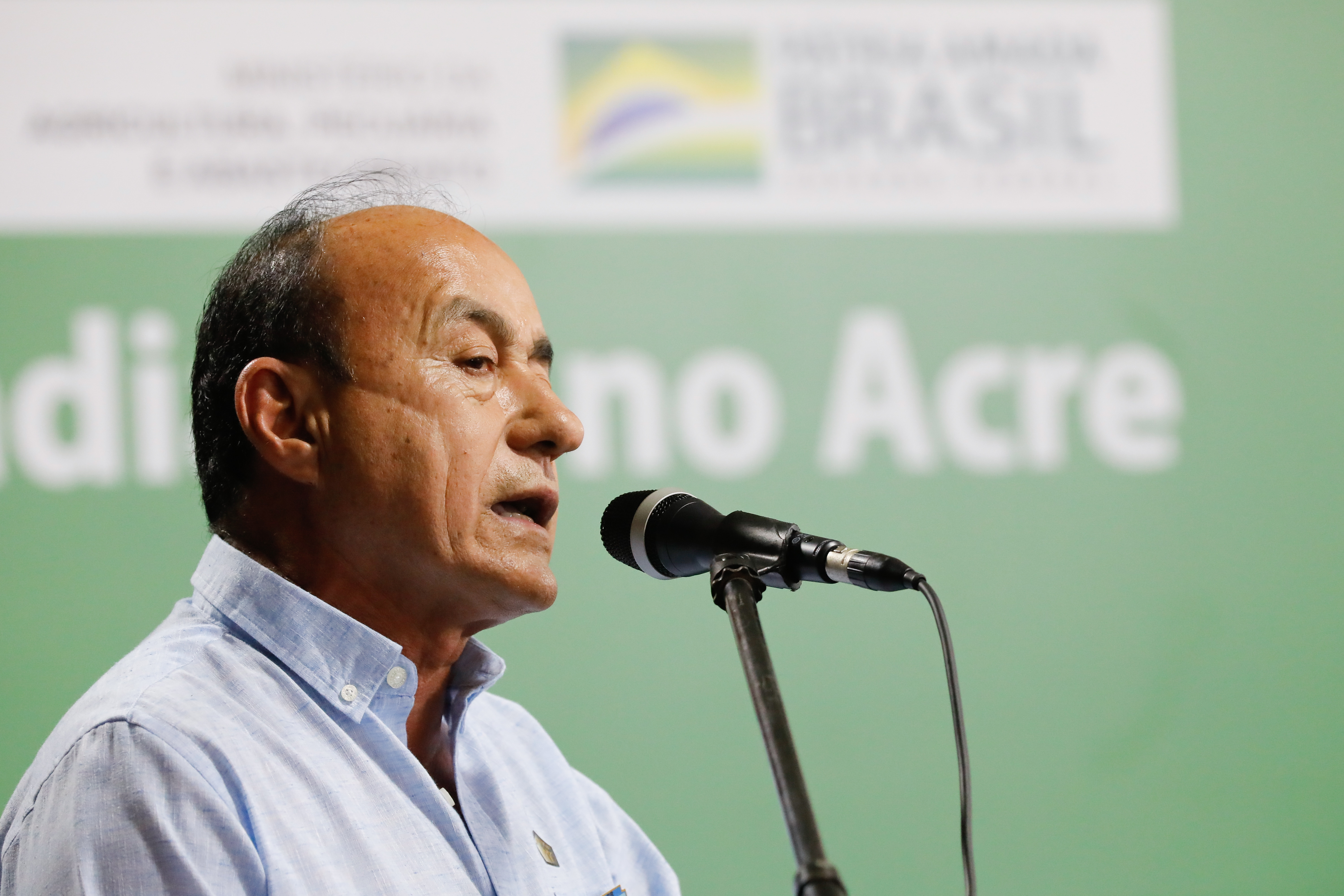
- Bocalom in 2022

Mayor of Rio Branco
- In office January 1, 2021 – April 2026
- Preceded by: Socorro Neri
- Succeeded by: Alysson Bestene

Mayor of Acrelândia
- In office January 1, 2001 – March 24, 2006

Secretary of Agriculture of Acre
- In office January 1999 – May 2000
- Governor: Jorge Viana

1st Mayor of Acrelândia
- In office 1993–1996

Personal details
- Born: Sebastião Bocalom Rodrigues; May 18, 1953 (age 73) Bela Vista do Paraíso, Paraná, Brazil
- Party: PSDB (2026–present)
- Other political affiliations: PDS (1982); PPR (1993–1996); PSDB (2000–2013); DEM (2013–2018); PSL (2018–2020); PP (2020–2024); PL (2024–2026)
- Education: Mandaguari School of Philosophy, Sciences, and Letters
- Occupation: Mathematician teacher

Sebastião Bocalom Rodrigues (May 18, 1953), better known as Tião Bocalom, is a Brazilian mathematician and politician affiliated with the Brazilian Social Democracy Party (PSDB). He served as mayor of Rio Branco, the capital of the state of Acre, from 2021 to 2026, having been elected in 2020 and reelected in the 2024 election. In April 2026, he resigned from the mayor’s office to run for governor in the October election of that same year.

== Biography ==
=== First years and education ===
Sebastião was born in Bela Vista do Paraíso, a city located in the interior of the state of Paraná. He moved to Mandaguari, also in the interior of Paraná, where he earned a degree in mathematics from the Mandaguari School of Philosophy, Sciences, and Letters. After graduating, he began working as a math teacher.

=== Politics ===
He began his political career in the city of Nova Olímpia, in the interior of Paraná, as a member of the Democratic Social Party (PDS). In the 1982 election, he was elected city councilor after receiving 166 votes, making him the second-highest vote-getter in the election. In 1986, he went to the state of Acre on vacation and was invited to start a lumber business, where he settled with his family the following year. A resident of Acre and a member of the Reform Progressive Party (PPR), he became, in 1993, the first mayor of the city of Acrelândia, which had been founded in 1992. He served as mayor until 1996. He served as State Secretary of Agriculture for the State of Acre from January 1999 to May 2000, during Jorge Viana’s (PT) administration.

In 2000, as a member of the Brazilian Social Democracy Party (PSDB), he ran again for mayor of Acrelândia. He was elected, becoming mayor of Acrelândia once again until 2004. In 2004, he ran for mayor again. He was elected after receiving more than 2,000 votes. He resigned from his position on March 24, 2006, to run for governor of Acre. Running as a candidate for the PSDB in the 2006 election, he finished in third place in a race won by Binho Marques (PT). In the 2008 municipal elections, he ran for mayor of Rio Branco, the capital of the state of Acre, as a candidate for the PSDB. Tião finished the election in third place, in a race won by Raimundo Angelim (PT).

In the 2010 elections, he ran again for governor of Acre as a candidate for the PSDB. This time, he formed a broad coalition with Brazilian Democratic Movement (PMDB), Democrats (DEM), Social Liberal Party (PSL), Social Christian Party (PSC), Popular Socialist Party (PPS), National Mobilization Party (PMN) Labour Party of Brazil (PTdoB) and managed to secure 49.18% of the valid votes in the first round, but was defeated by candidate Tião Viana (PT), who secured 50.51% and won the election in the first round. In the end, the margin between the candidates was less than 5,000 votes, making it one of the closest gubernatorial elections in modern Brazilian history.

In the 2012 municipal elections, he ran for mayor of the capital, Rio Branco, also as a candidate for the PSDB, and advanced to the runoff against candidate Marcus Alexandre (PT). While he received 43.85% of the vote in the first round, he secured 49.81% of the valid votes in the runoff, losing by a margin of fewer than 3,000 votes. In the 2014 elections, for the third consecutive time, Tião Bocalom ran for governor of Acre. However, he ran as a candidate for the DEM, while the PSDB fielded another candidate: Márcio Bittar. In addition to the DEM, its coalition included the PMN and the Green Party (PV). Bocalom finished in third place in an election won by Tião Vianna.

After deciding to support Jair Bolsonaro’s presidential bid, he joined the PSL to run in the 2018 elections. This time, he chose to run for federal deputy. After the polls closed, it became clear that he had failed to win a seat due to the electoral coefficient. He was the third-highest-voted candidate for federal deputy in the city of Rio Branco and the highest-voted candidate in the city of Acrelândia, where he had served as mayor. However, even though he was the fifth-highest-voted candidate in the state, he failed to win a seat.

In the 2020 municipal elections, he ran again for mayor of Rio Branco. This time, as a member of the Progressistas (PP), he received 49.58% of the valid votes in the first round. In the runoff election against then-Mayor Socorro Neri (PSB), he was elected mayor with more than 62% of the vote. According to a report by G1, the Grupo Globo's online news portal, he has fulfilled only one of his 49 campaign promises in his first year in office; the politician claims that the low number is due to the economic effects of the COVID-19 pandemic. In March 2024, he left the PP and joined the Liberal Party (PL). As a candidate for the PL, he was reelected in the Rio Branco municipal election, winning in the first round with 54% of the valid votes and defeating his predecessor as mayor, Marcus Alexandre (MDB). In April 2026, he resigned as mayor to run for governor in the October elections of that same year, handing over the office to his deputy, Alysson Bestene. As part of a political maneuver led by Aécio Neves, the PSDB’s national president, Tião Bocalom returned to the party in 2026. Bocalom had been a member of the PSDB for sixteen years. As a candidate for the PSDB, he ran for governor of Acre in 2026. He finished the race in third place, failing to advance to the runoff, after being overtaken by Alan Rick (Republicanos) and Mailza Gomes (Progressives).

==== Electoral performance ====
Year	Position	Party	Votes	Result	Ref.
1982	City council member of Nova Olímpia	PDS	166	Elected	
2004	Mayor of Acrelândia	PSDB	2 173	Elected	
2006	Governor of Acre	PSDB	34 752	Not elected	
2008	Mayor of Rio Branco	PSDB	35 177	Not elected	
2010	Governor of Acre	PSDB	165 705	Not elected	
2012	Mayor of Rio Branco	PSDB	87 818	Not elected	
2014	Governor of Acre	DEM	76 218	Not elected	
2018	Federal deputy from Acre	PSL	21 872	Not elected	
2020	Mayor of Rio Branco	PP	104 746	Elected	
2024	Mayor of Rio Branco	PL	108 605	Elected	
2026	Governor of Acre	PSDB	44 946	Not elected	

== Personal life ==
He was married to Elisabeth Aparecida Garcia Rodrigues, who died in 2021 from amyotrophic lateral sclerosis, with whom he had two children, Luciana and Júnior. Júnior died at the age of 12 from leukemia. Luciana married Josivan, and they had three granddaughters: Isabela, Ana Luisa, and Maria Rita.
