= 2018 Acre general election =

2018 Acre gubernatorial election
- 7 October 2018
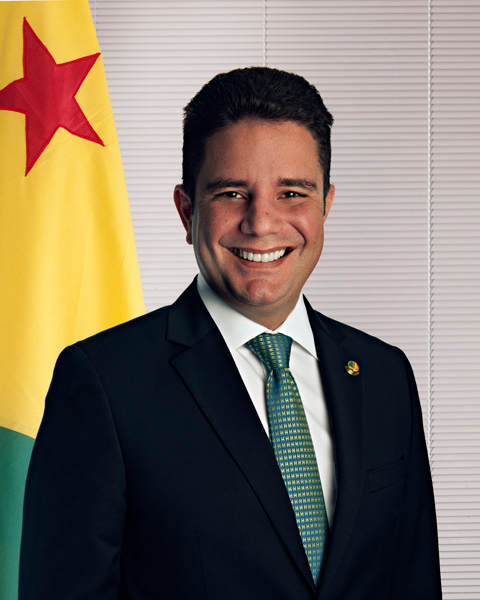

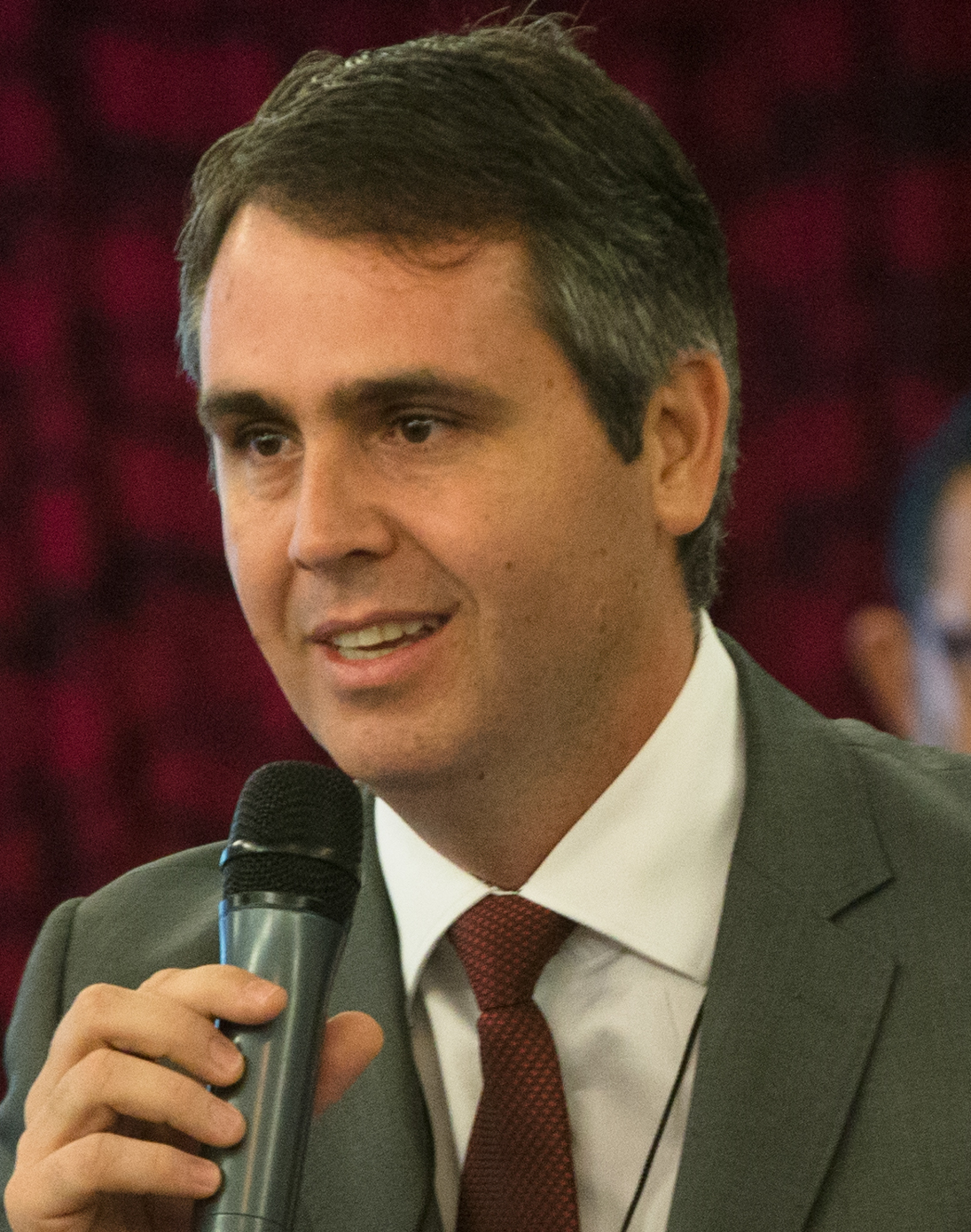
Nominee	Gladson Cameli	Marcus Alexandre
Party	PP	PT
Running mate	Major Rocha	Emylson Farias
Popular vote	223,993	144,071
Percentage	53.71%	34.54%
- Results by municipality
Governor before election
Tião Viana
PT
Elected Governor
Gladson Cameli
PP

A gubernatorial election was held in Acre on 7 October 2018 to elect the next governor of the state, 8 federal deputies, and two out of its three senators. Senator Gladson Cameli won 53% of the vote in the first round, making him the elected governor of Acre without the need for a runoff. Senator Sérgio Petecão was reelected with 30% of the vote and former congressman Márcio Bittar was elected with 23% of the vote, unseating Jorge Viana, one of the incumbent senators.

The previous gubernatorial election in the state was held in October 2014. Workers' Party candidate Tião Viana was re-elected after a runoff with 51.29% of the vote, beating PSDB candidate Márcio Bittar, who got 48.71% of the vote.

== Candidates for governor ==
=== Progressistas (PP) ===
- Gladson Cameli - Senator for Acre since 2015; Federal deputy for Acre 2007–2015.

=== Workers' Party (PT) ===
- Marcus Alexandre -Rio Branco mayor 2013–2018.

=== Social Liberal Party (PSL) ===
- Coronel Ulysses - Former military police colonel.

=== Avante ===
- David Hall - Ufac philosophy teacher.

=== Rede Sustentabilidade (REDE) ===
- Janaina Furtado - Alderwoman of Tarauacá since 2017.

== Candidates for senator ==
=== Social Democratic Party (PSD) ===
- Sérgio Petecão - Senator for Acre since 2011; Federal deputy for Acre 2007–2011; State deputy for Acre 1995–2007.

=== Brazilian Democratic Movement (MDB) ===
- Márcio Bittar - Federal deputy for Acre 1999–2003, 2011–2015.

=== Workers' Party (PT) ===
- Jorge Viana - Rio Branco mayor 1993–1997; Governor of Acre 1999–2007; Senator for Acre since 2013.
- Ney Amorim - State deputy since 2006.

=== Rede Sustentabilidade (REDE) ===
- Minoru Kinpara - Ufac director of development of teaching.

=== Social Liberal Party (PSL) ===
- Pedrazza - Lawyer.

== Debates ==
Date	Host	Moderator	Gladson Cameli (PP)	Marcus Alexandre (PT)	Coronel Ulysses (PSL)	David Hall (AVANTE)	Janaina Furtado (REDE)
3 October 2018	Globo, Rede Amazônica, G1	Júlio Mosquéra	Present	Present	Present	Present	Not Invited

== Results ==
=== Governor ===
Candidate	Running mate	First round	
Candidate	Running mate	Valid Votes	%
Gladson Cameli (PP)	Major Rocha (PSDB)	223,993	53.71
Marcus Alexandre (PT)	Emylson Farias (PDT)	144,071	34.54
Coronel Ulysses (PSL)	Ressini Jarude (PSL)	45,032	10.80
Janaina Furtado (REDE)	Júlio César Freitas (REDE)	2,765	0.66
David Hall (AVANTE)	Thiago Gonçalves (AVANTE)	1,215	0.29
Valid votes		417,076	94,06
Null votes		19,115	4.31
Blank votes		7,238	1.63
Total votes		443,429	100
Turnout		443,429	80.96
Abstentions		104,251	19.04
Total		547,680	100

Popular vote
Cameli	53.71%
Alexandre	34.54%
Ulysses	10.80%
Furtado	0.66%
Hall	0.29%

=== Senator ===
Elect

Candidate	Valid Votes	%
Sérgio Petecão (PSD)	244,109	30.71
Márcio Bittar (MDB)	185,066	23.28
Jorge Viana (PT)	117,200	14.74
Ney Amorim (PT)	115,243	14.50
Minoru Kinpara (REDE)	112,989	14.21
Pedrazza (PSL)	20,302	2.55
Valid votes	794,909	89.63
Null votes	60,815	6.86
Blank votes	31,134	3.51
Total votes	886,858	100
Turnout	886,858	81.01
Abstentions	103,929	18.99
Total	990,787	100

Popular vote
Petecão	30.71%
Bittar	23.28%
Viana	14.74%
Amorim	14.50%
Kinpara	14.21%
Pedrazza	2.55%
