= LGBTQ rights in Acre =

- Location of Acre in Brazil.
- Legal status: Legal since 1830, age of consent equalised
- Gender identity: Gender change allowed, official standard for altering legal sex doesn't require surgery since 2018
- Military: Allowed to serve openly
- Discrimination protections: Since 2019

Family rights
- Recognition of relationships: Same-sex marriage since 2013
- Adoption: Legal since 2015

Lesbian, gay, bisexual, transgender and queer (LGBTQ) rights in the Brazilian state of Acre have had significant legal advances in recent decades.

== Legality ==
=== Same-sex sexual activity ===
In 1830, Brazilian Emperor Dom Pedro I sanctioned the Imperial Penal Code, removing all references to sodomy from Brazilian law.

=== Recognition of same-sex relationships ===
Same-sex marriage has been legal in Acre since 2013 via a decision by the National Council of Justice, in compliance with a previous decision of the Supreme Federal Court in 2011. In December 4, 2017, the Brazilian Institute of Family Law (IBDFAM) organized a collective same-sex marriage event, with 13 couples getting married in the state capital, Rio Branco.

=== Adoption and parenting ===
On May 30, 2008, Judge Luana Cláudia de Albuquerque Campos of the Civil Court of the District of Senador Guiomard rendered a favorable decision involving a gay couple adopting a child. The child had already been adopted by one member of the couple at the age of one year. The couple had been living in a stable relationship for eight years.

Since 2015, same-sex adoption has been legal nationwide through a decision by the Supreme Federal Court.

== Discrimination protections ==
On August 3, 2017, the Governor of Acre, Tião Viana, signed Decree No. 7,311, which establishes the State Council for Combating Discrimination and Promoting the Rights of Lesbians, Gays, Bisexuals, Travestis, and Transsexuals. The council aims to propose public policies for the LGBTQ community in the state.

In 2019, through a decision by the Supreme Federal Court, discrimination based on sexual orientation and gender identity became explicitly illegal, being equated to the crime of racism.

On December 30, 2020, the mayor of Rio Branco, Socorro Neri, enacted Law No. 2389, which prohibits discrimination based on sexual orientation and gender identity in the city.

On January 29, 2025, the government of Acre, through the State Secretariat for Social Assistance and Human Rights (SEASDH) and the Public Prosecutor's Office of Acre (MPAC), signed a cooperation agreement aimed at promoting LGBTQ rights. The event also included the launch of the booklet "What you need to know about the rights of the LGBTQIAPN+ population: Name and gender change for Trans and Travesti people" (Brazilian Portuguese: O que você precisa saber sobre os direitos da população LGBTQIAPN+: Mudança de nome e gênero de pessoas Trans e Travestis), which aims to guide transgender people in the state on the process of rectifying their documents.

== Gender identity and expression ==
On December 19, 2017, the governor of Acre, Tião Viana, signed Law No. 3,355, which guarantees the use of social name by transgender people.

The Supreme Federal Court of Brazil ruled on 1 March 2018, that a transgender person has the right to change their official name and sex without the need of surgery or professional evaluation, just by self-declaration of their psychosocial identity.

On October 15, 2024, the Court of Justice of Acre published Order No. 15/2024, establishing that the legal change of name and gender on documents must be free of charge for individuals lacking the financial means to pay.

In 2025, Ariel Sebastos became the first person in the state to obtain a document marked with the gender "X". Despite the law allows non-binary people to change their documents, it still requires judicial actions.

== Censorship ==
On November 13, 2024, the Rio Branco City Council approved a bill, Bill No. 14/2024, which aimed to prohibit the participation of children and adolescents in LGBTQ pride parades in the city. The bill was proposed by Councilman João Marcos Luz, of the Liberal Party, and was approved with 10 votes in favor and 1 vote against. The bill was criticized by the Federal Public Prosecutor's Office, which accused it of perpetuating stereotypes about homosexual people.

The bill was vetoed by the then mayor of Rio Branco, Tião Bocalom, claiming that the bill was unconstitutional.

== Life conditions ==
=== Pride parade ===
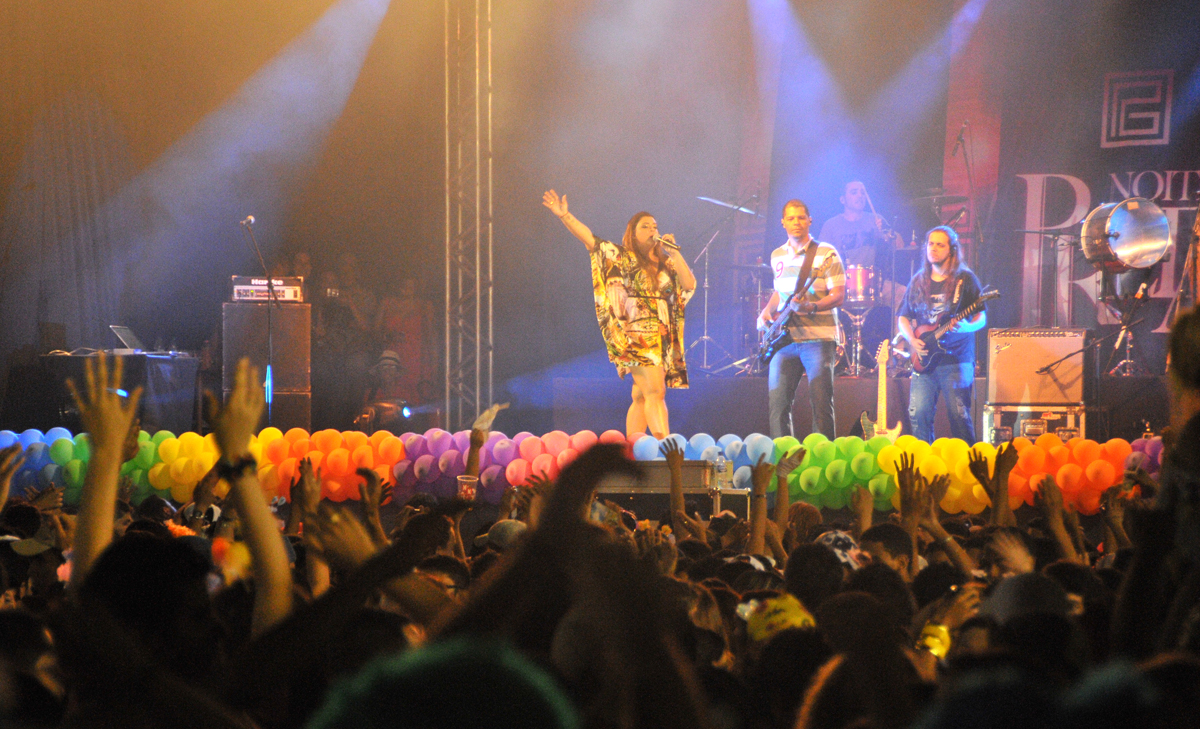
Singer Preta Gil during the Acre LGBT+ Pride Parade in 2009.

Every year (Note: With the exception of 2025, which was postponed to 2026 due to administrative and financial issues.) in Rio Branco, the Acre LGBT+ Pride Parade takes place, organized by the Associação de Homossexuais do Acre. Singer Preta Gil participated in the 5th edition of the event, on September 20, 2009. The 17th edition of the event took place on December 1st, World AIDS Day.

=== Statistics ===
A 2019 survey by the Brazilian Institute of Geography and Statistics showed that 1.3% of people in the state identified as homosexual or bisexual, and 2.8% either did not want to or did not know how to answer what their sexual orientation was. The survey was criticized by the Public Prosecutor's Office of Acre for being based on the National Health Survey (PNS), instead of the 2022 Brazilian Census, and for not collecting information on gender identity.

=== Discrimination ===
Despite laws protecting against discrimination, LGBTQ people may face discrimination in the state. A survey conducted by the Associação de Homossexuais do Acre showed that between 2007 and 2018, 18 murders of homosexual people were recorded in the state, with 14 of them occurring in the state's capital, Rio Branco. On December 22, 2025, the LGBTQ activist and public prosecutor of Acre Moisés Alencastro was found dead in his apartment in Rio Branco.

==== Social media ====
In August 2020, Nelson de Freitas Correia—a pastor and an official within the Secretariat of Social Assistance, Human Rights, and Policies for Women—became the subject of an investigation into homophobia and transphobia following his comments on a post by the company Natura that featured actor Thammy Miranda. In a statement, the government of Acre asserted that it did not condone discriminatory practices. On August 17, 2020, Governor Gladson Cameli signed a decree dismissing Correia from his position, but he revoked the decree the following day, on August 18.

On September 8, 2020, following a recommendation from the Secretariat of Human Rights, Correia was transferred to the State Secretariat of Planning and Management. In August 2023, Correia was sentenced to three years and six months in prison; the sentence was subsequently converted into community service. On July 11, 2024, the Court of Justice of Acre upheld the conviction and ordered him to pay 100,000 reais in damages for collective moral harm. In July 2024, the Court of Justice reduced the fine to 6,000 reais.

In April 2023, the Federal Public Prosecutor's Office sent a formal request to X seeking an explanation, following the platform's removal of "misgendering" and "deadnaming" from its hate speech policy in April 2022. In May 2023, the Public Prosecutor's Office opened an inquiry into the platform. In October 2023, prosecutor Lucas Costa Almeida Dias filed a lawsuit against X. On December 15, 2023, the 2nd Federal Court of the Judicial Section of Acre ordered the platform to reinstate these policies. In February 2024, following this ruling, X reinstated its policies against misgendering and deadnaming.

On July 16, 2026, the Federal Public Prosecutor's Office appealed to the Federal Regional Court of the 1st Region, seeking a partial revision of the 2nd Federal Court's ruling; the objective is for X to be ordered to issue a public apology to the trans community and to promote campaigns to combat transphobia. The case remains under court review as of November 4, 2026.

== Summary table ==
Same-sex sexual activity legal	Yes (Since 1830)
Equal age of consent	Yes (Since 1830)
Anti-discrimination laws in employment only	Yes (Since 2019)
Anti-discrimination laws in the provision of goods and services	Yes (Since 2019)
Anti-discrimination laws in all other areas (Incl. indirect discrimination, hate speech)	Yes (Since 2019)
Same-sex marriages	Yes (Since 2013)
Recognition of same-sex couples	Yes (Since 2011)
Stepchild adoption by same-sex couples	Yes (Since 2010)
Joint adoption by same-sex couples	Yes (Since 2010)
LGBTQ people allowed to serve openly in the military	Yes
Right to change legal gender	Yes (Since 2008; gender self-identification since 2018)
Third gender option	Yes (Since 2025)
Conversion therapy by medical professionals banned	Yes (Since 1999 for homosexuals and since 2018 for transgender people)
Access to IVF for lesbians	Yes (Since 2013)
Commercial surrogacy for gay male couples	No (Banned for any couple regardless of sexual orientation)
MSMs allowed to donate blood	Yes (Since 2020)
