= 2010 Acre general election =

2010 Acre gubernatorial election
- October 3, 2010
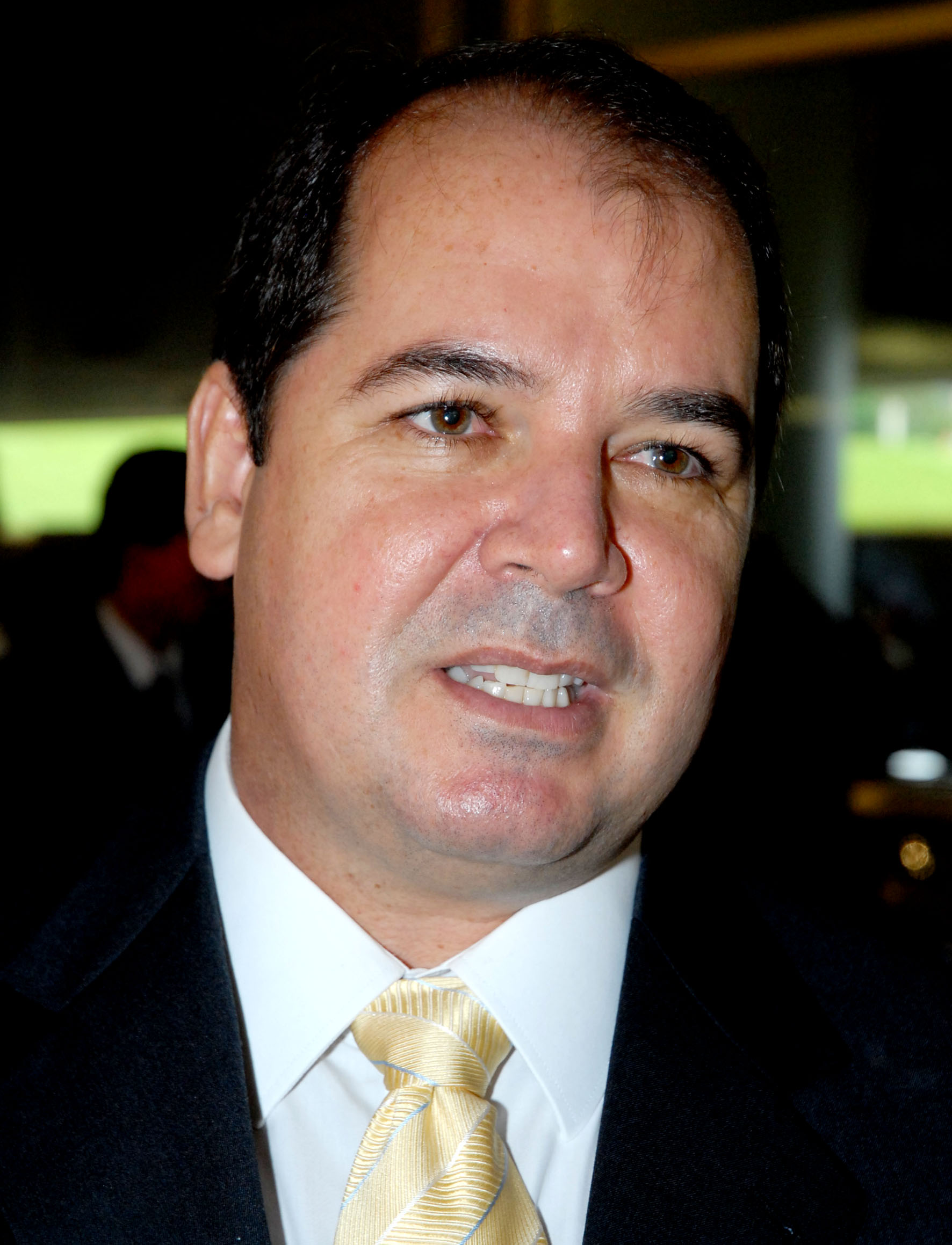

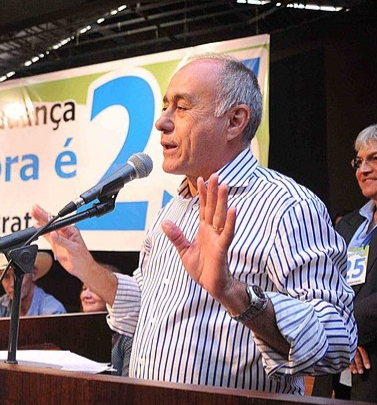
Nominee	Tião Viana	Tião Bocalom
Party	PT	PSDB
Running mate	Cesar Messias	Pastor Ildson
Popular vote	170,202	165,705
Percentage	50.51%	49.18%
Governor before election
Binho Marques
PT
Elected Governor
Tião Viana
PT

The Acre gubernatorial election was held on October 3, 2010, to elect the next governor of Acre. The PT's Tião Viana narrowly won the election and barely avoided a runoff.

== Coalitions ==
Candidate	Running mate	Coalition
Tião Viana; PT	Nazareth Lambert; PT	"Frente Popular do Acre" (PT, PDT, PRB, PSL, PTN, PSDC, PHS, PSB, PRP, PEN, PPL, PCdoB, PROS, PTB)
Tião Bocalom; DEM	Henrique Afonso; PV	"Produzir Para Empregar" (DEM, PV, PMN)
Márcio Bittar; PSDB	Antonia Sales; PMDB	"Aliança Por Um Acre Melhor" (PSDB, PMDB, PTdoB, PSC, PTC, PPS, PR, SD, PP, PSD)
Antônio Rocha; PSOL	Dany Mendonça; PSOL	-

== Election results ==
2010 Acre Gubernatorial Election
Party	Candidate	Votes	%	±%
PT	Tião Viana	170,202	50.51%	−2.54
PSDB	Tião Bocalom	165,705	49.18%	+38.07
PRTB	Antonio Neres Gouveia (Tijolinho)	1,035	0.31%	—
Majority		4,497	1.33%	−16.6
PT hold		Swing		
