= Wildy Viana =

Brazilian radiotelegrapher and mayor (1929–2017)

Member of the Chamber of Deputies from Acre
- In office 1 February 1979 – 31 January 1987

Member of the Legislative Assembly of Acre
- In office 1967–1979

Mayor of Rio Branco
- In office January 1966 – July 1966
- Preceded by: Raimundo Hermínio de Melo
- Succeeded by: Adauto Brito da Frota

Member of the Municipal Chamber of Rio Branco
- In office 1963–1967

Personal details
- Born: Wildy Viana das Neves; April 26, 1929 Brasiléia, Acre, Brazil
- Died: March 13, 2017 (aged 87) Rio Branco, Acre, Brazil
- Party: UDN (1945–1965); ARENA (1966–1979); PDS (1980–1987); PT (1987–2017)
- Spouse: Sílvia Neves
- Children: Jorge Viana; Tião Viana
- Profession: Radiotelegrapher, Politician

Wildy Viana das Neves (26 April 1929 – 13 March 2017) was a Brazilian radiotelegrapher and politician who served as a member of the Chamber of Deputies representing the state of Acre from 1979 to 1987. He also served as the mayor of Rio Branco from January to July 1966. He was also a deputy of the Legislative Assembly of Acre from 1967 to 1979. He was the father of Jorge Viana and Tião Viana, both of them are politicians who served as the governor of Acre.

== Early life ==
Wildy Viana das Neves was born on 26 April 1929 in Brasiléia, in the interior of the then-Federal Territory of Acre. He is the son of Mário das Neves, and his wife, Maria Viana das Neves. He worked as a radiotelegrapher before entering politics. He was employed by the Department of Post and Telegraphs and later served in the territorial administration of Acre. He got a role in local civic associations and civil society groups in Rio Branco, which served as the foundation for his entry into public office in the early 1960s.

== Career ==
Viana started his political career in 1967 as a member of the National Democratic Union. He was elected to the Municipal Chamber of Rio Branco in 1962. Following the imposition of two-party rule by the Brazilian military regime in 1965, he joined the National Renewal Alliance party. In January 1966, he was elected as the Mayor of Rio Branco. His term later ended six months later in July 1966. He then was elected to the Legislative Assembly of Acre, where he served in the assembly three times from 1967 to 1979.

In the 1978 Brazilian parliamentary election, Viana was elected to the Chamber of Deputies representing Acre. He switched his party to Democratic Social Party and was re-elected in 1982. He got a major role in the voting on the 1984 Dante de Oliveira amendment, which restored presidential elections in Brazil. Viana switched and joined another party called Workers' Party, supporting the political organization led in Acre by his sons, Jorge Viana and Tião Viana.

== Personal life ==
Viana was married to Sílvia Falcão Macedo das Neves. They had four children. Wildy Viana Filho, Sílvia Helena, Jorge Viana, and Tião Viana.

Viana died on 13 March 2017, in Rio Branco, Acre, Brazil, at the age of 87.

Political offices
Preceded by Raimundo Hermínio de Melo	Mayor of Rio Branco; January 1966–July 1966	Succeeded by Adauto Brito da Frota
