= Aníbal Diniz =

Brazilian journalist and politician

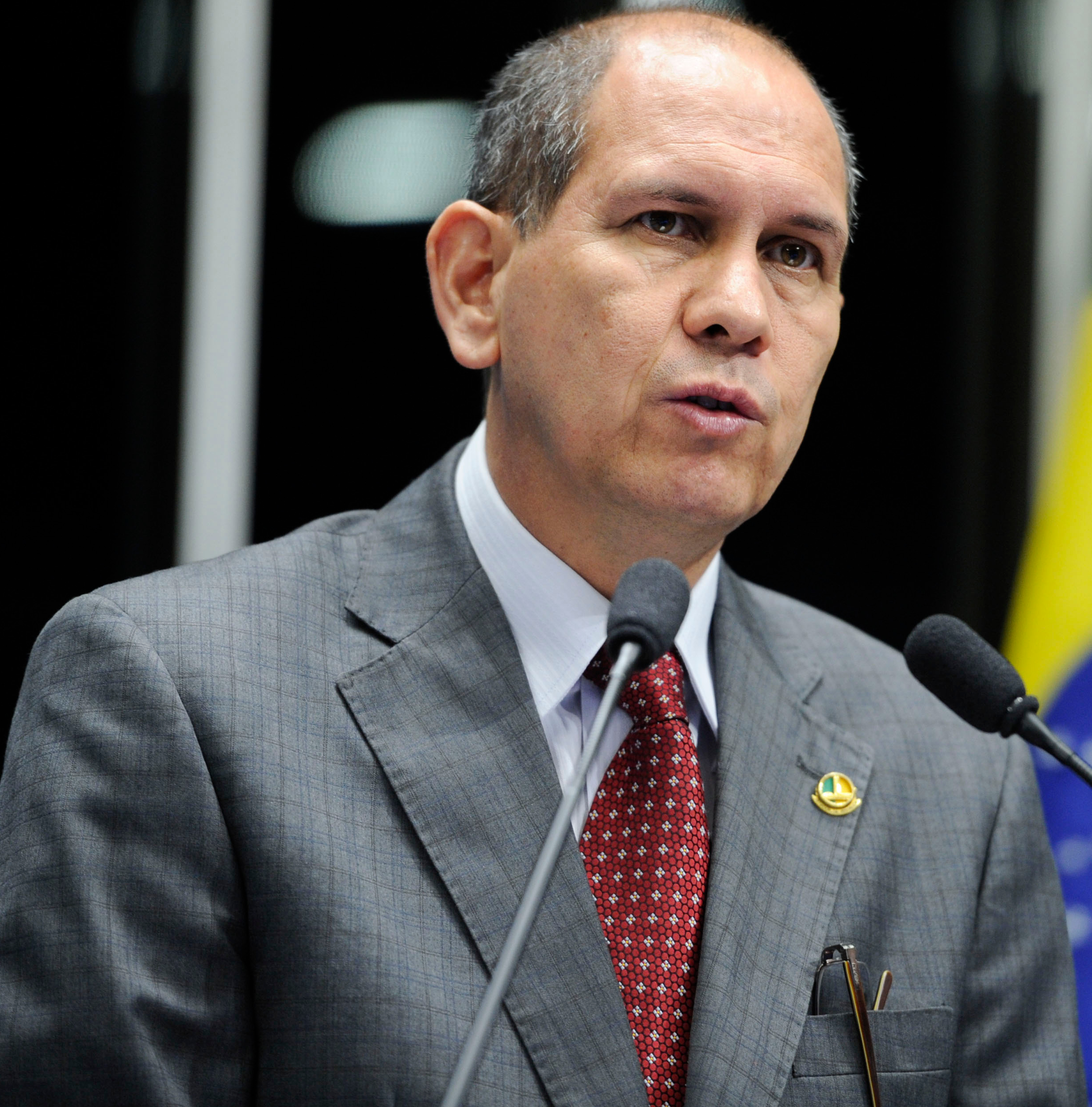

Senator from Acre
- In office December 21, 2010 – February 5, 2015
- Preceded by: Tiao Viana
- Succeeded by: Gladson Cameli

Personal details
- Born: December 13, 1962 (age 63) Campo Mourão, Paraná
- Party: Workers' Party
- Profession: journalist

Aníbal Diniz (born December 13, 1962) is a Brazilian journalist and politician. He represented Acre in the Federal Senate from 2010 to 2015. He is a member of the Workers' Party.
