= Roberto Duarte (politician) =

Brazilian politician (born 1975)

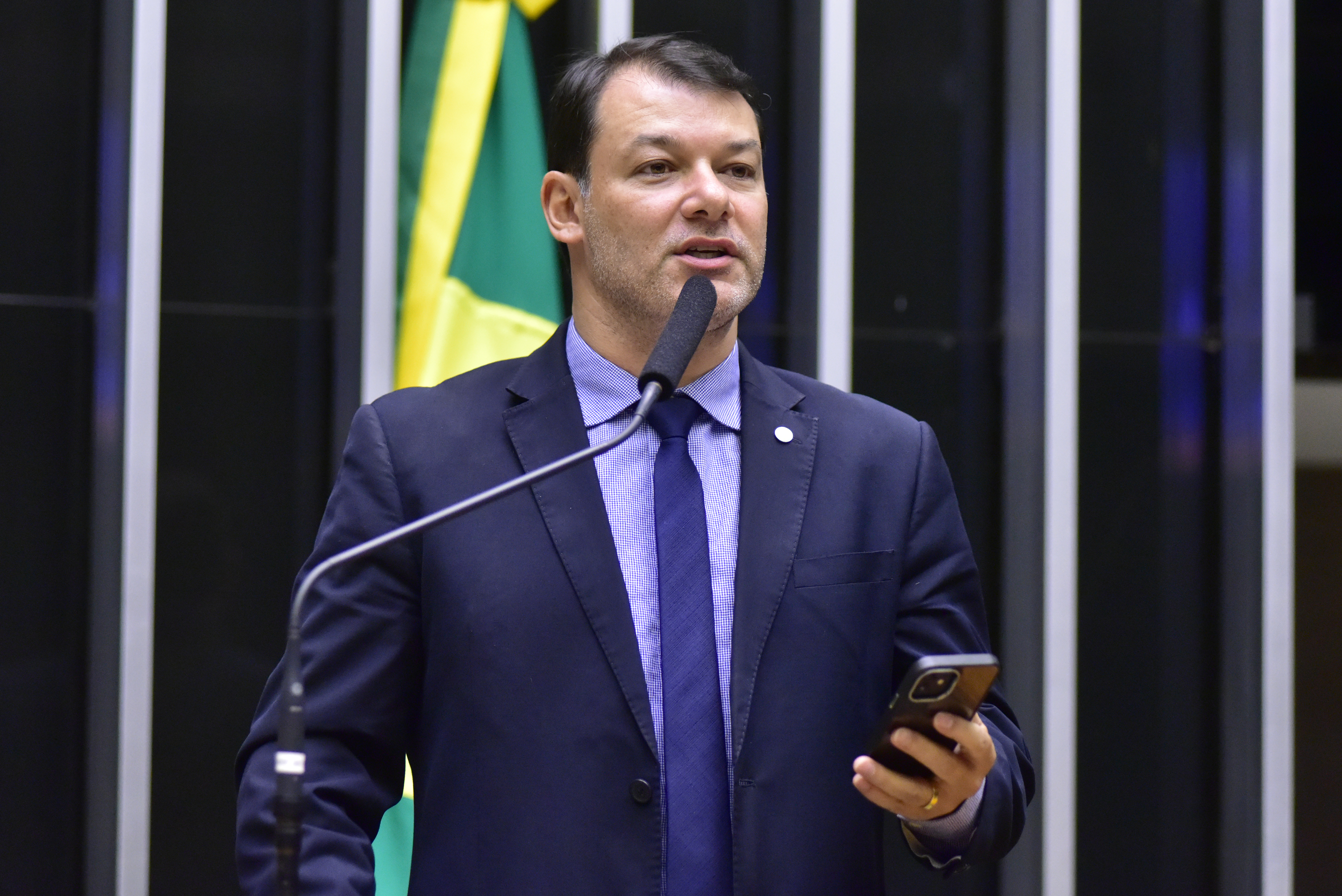
- Duarte in 2023

Member of the Chamber of Deputies
- Incumbent
- Assumed office 1 February 2023
- Constituency: Acre

Member of the Legislative Assembly of Acre
- In office 1 February 2019 – 1 February 2023
- Constituency: At-large

Personal details
- Born: Roberto Duarte Júnior; 25 April 1975 (age 51) Porto Alegre, Rio Grande do Sul, Brazil
- Party: Republicanos (since 2022)
- Other political affiliations: PMN (until 2015); MDB (2015–2022)

Roberto Duarte Júnior (born 25 April 1975) is a Brazilian politician serving as a member of the Chamber of Deputies since 2023. From 2019 to 2022, he was a member of the Legislative Assembly of Acre.
