= List of mayors of Rio Branco, Acre =

The following is a list of mayors of the city of Rio Branco, in Acre state, Brazil.

- Antônio de Sousa Braga, 1900–1908
- Protógenes Guimarães, 1908–1912
- Adrião Ribeiro, 1912–1916
- João de Deus Barreto, 1917–1920
- Laudo de Camargo, 1920–1925
- Plínio Barreto, 1925–1929
- Francisco José da Silva Jr, 1929
- Raul Soares de Moura, 1929–1936
- Landry Salles, 1936–1945
- Nelson de Mello, 1945–1950
- Adalberto Sena, 1950–1953
- José Augusto de Araújo, 1953–1957
- Geraldo Mesquita, 1957–1961
- Nabor Teles Jr, 1961–1963
- Aníbal Miranda Ferreira da Silva, 1963–1964
- Raimundo Hermínio de Melo, 1964–1966, 1966–1968
- Wildy Viana, 1966
- Adauto Brito da Frota, 1969–1971, 1975–1977
- Durval Wanderley Dantas, 1971–1975
- Fernando Inácio dos Santos, 1977–1983
- Flaviano Melo, 1983–1985, 2001–2002
- Adalberto Aragão, 1986–1988
- Jorge Kalume, 1989–1992
- Jorge Viana, 1993–1996
- Mauri Sérgio, 1997–2000
- Isnard Leite, 2002–2004
- Raimundo Angelim, 2005–2012
- Marcus Alexandre, 2013–2018
- Socorro Neri, since 2018

== See also ==
- Elections in Rio Branco (in Portuguese)
- List of mayors of largest cities in Brazil (in Portuguese)
- List of mayors of capitals of Brazil (in Portuguese)
