= Adelaide Neri =

Brazilian teacher and politician (1940–2018)

Federal Deputy for Acre
- In office February 1991 – January 1995
- In office 6 May 1997 – 7 August 1997

Personal details
- Born: Antonia Adelaide da Rocha Neri; 16 December 1940 Tarauacá, Acre, Brazil
- Died: 24 May 2018 (aged 77) Rio Branco, Acre, Brazil
- Party: Brazilian Democratic Movement
- Spouse: Raimundo Nonato de Paiva Neri
- Children: 6, including Socorro
- Education: Federal University of Acre
- Occupation: Teacher

Antonia Adelaide da Rocha Neri (16 December 1940 – 24 May 2018) was a Brazilian teacher and Brazilian Democratic Movement politician who served as a Federal Deputy for Acre in the Chamber of Deputies from 1991 to 1995 and again in 1997. She was an elementary school teacher in her hometown and was director of the Department of Supplementary Education of the Secretariat of Education and Culture of Acre in Rio Branco.

== Biography ==
Neri was born in the city of Tarauacá, Acre on 16 December 1940, to Vicente Crescêncio da Rocha and Rosa Machado da Rocha. She worked as an elementary school teacher at the Plácido de Castro School in her hometown from 1974 to 1979 and supervised the Minerva Project as a Municipal Coordinator between 1978 and 1979. In 1983, Neri became director of the Department of Supplementary Education of the Secretariat of Education and Culture of Acre in Rio Branco, serving in the role until 1990. In 1984, she graduated with letters from the Federal University of Acre, having enrolled at the university four years earlier.

In 1965, Neri became a member of the anti-military regime Brazilian Democratic Movement (MDB) political party. She was elected as a Federal Deputy of Acre in the Chamber of Deputies in the 1990 Brazilian legislative election held that October and was sworn in during February 1991. Neri was appointed to serve on the Committee on Education, Culture and Sport and became an alternate member of the Committee on Agriculture and Rural Policy. She was also an alternate on the Modifications to the Structure of the Judiciary, the Traffic and Transport Commission, the commission of inquiry (CPI) on Causes of Misery and Hunger, the CPI on Violence against Women and the Mixed CPI Mass sterilization in Brazil. Neri voted to impeach president Fernando Collor de Mello for corruption in late September 1992. She was in support of the creation of the Provisional Tax on Financial Transactions, the Emergency Social Fund and against the abolition of mandatory voting. Neri unsuccessfully ran for re-election to the Chamber of Deputies at the 1994 Brazilian general election, having been the third substitute; she remained in the Chamber until the conclusion of January 1995.

Neri returned to the Chamber of Deputies on 6 May 1997 after Chicão Brígido, the deputy mayor of Rio Branco, left the legislature to become a member of the municipal secretariat in the Acre capital. She remained in the Chamber until 7 August 1997, when Brígido returned to the legislature, and she did not run in the 1998 Brazilian general election held that October. In 2003, Neri was briefly appointed provider of the Santa Casa de Misericórdia do Acre before being replaced by José Alekssandro when there was a major administrative and financial crisis at the entity. Three years later, she and three others were denounced by the Public Prosecutor's Office for embezzling amounts deducted from the remuneration of employees from January 1999 to April 2003 and between June and October 2003, intended to pay for social security contributions.

== Personal life ==
She was married to Raimundo Nonato de Paiva Neri. They had six children. Her daughter, Socorro Neri, has served as mayor of Rio Branco. On the morning of 24 May 2018, Neri died at her local hospital's emergency room in Rio Branco, Acre, from undisclosed reasons. Her wake took place at Capela São Francisco, and she was buried at Cemitério São João Batista.
