= Iolanda Fleming =

Brazilian professor and politician

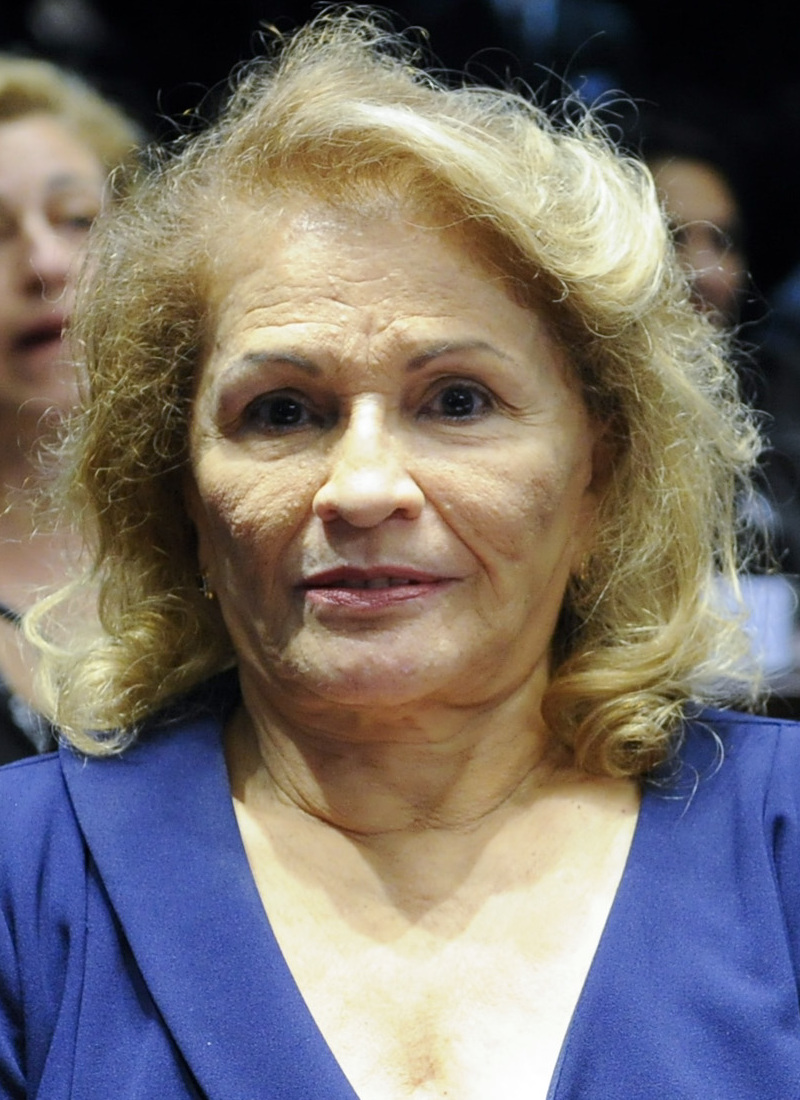
- Iolanda Fleming

Governor of Acre
- In office 14 May 1986 – 15 March 1987
- Vice Governor: None
- Preceded by: Nabor Júnior
- Succeeded by: Flaviano Melo

Vice Governor of Acre
- In office 15 March 1983 – 14 May 1986
- Governor: Nabor Júnior
- Preceded by: José Fernandes Rego
- Succeeded by: Édison Simão Cadaxo

State Deputy of Acre
- In office 1 February 1979 – 31 January 1983

Vice Mayor of Rio Branco
- In office 1 January 1989 – 31 December 1992
- Mayor: Jorge Kalume
- Preceded by: Airton Rocha
- Succeeded by: Regina Lino

Personal details
- Born: 20 June 1936 (age 90) Manoel Urbano, Acre, Brazil
- Party: PTB (2009–present)
- Other political affiliations: Other parties: MDB (1966–2009) PTB (1954–1965)
- Spouse: Geraldo Fleming
- Education: Federal University of Acre

Iolanda Lima Fleming (born 20 June 1936, Manoel Urbano) is a Brazilian professor and politician. She is noted as the first woman to become a state governor in Brazil. She served as the Governor of Acre from 1986 to 1987.

Fleming is the daughter of Horacio Lima, a rubber tapper and native of Ceará; and Nazira Anute Lima, a Brazilian of Lebanese descent. She was married to Geraldo Fleming (1929–1991), a politician and military officer from Minas Gerais.

Fleming was originally a member of the Brazilian Democratic Movement (MDB) and served on the city council of Rio Branco, the capital of Acre, and as a deputy to the state legislature. She served as Vice Governor of Acre under Nabor Teles da Rocha Júnior as part of the Brazilian Democratic Movement (MDB). She finally served as Vice Mayor of Rio Branco, the capital of Acre, from 1989 to 1993 as part of the Brazilian Labour Party (PTB).
