= Emerson Jarude =

Brazilian politician (1989)

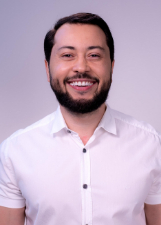
Emerson Jarude (2024)

Emerson Oliveira Jarude Thomaz (born November 5, 1989, in Rio Branco) is a Brazilian politician and advocate, affiliated with the New Party (NOVO).

He holds a law degree from the Federal University of Acre (UFAC) and passed the Order of Attorneys of Brazil (OAB) exam.

He has been elected as state deputy in 2022, before he had served as city councillor of Rio Branco since 2016.
