= Nova Olímpia =

Nova Olímpia (Portuguese meaning "New Olympia") may refer to the following places in Brazil:

- Nova Olímpia, Mato Grosso
- Nova Olímpia, Paraná
