= Eduardo Velloso =

Brazilian politician (born 1976)

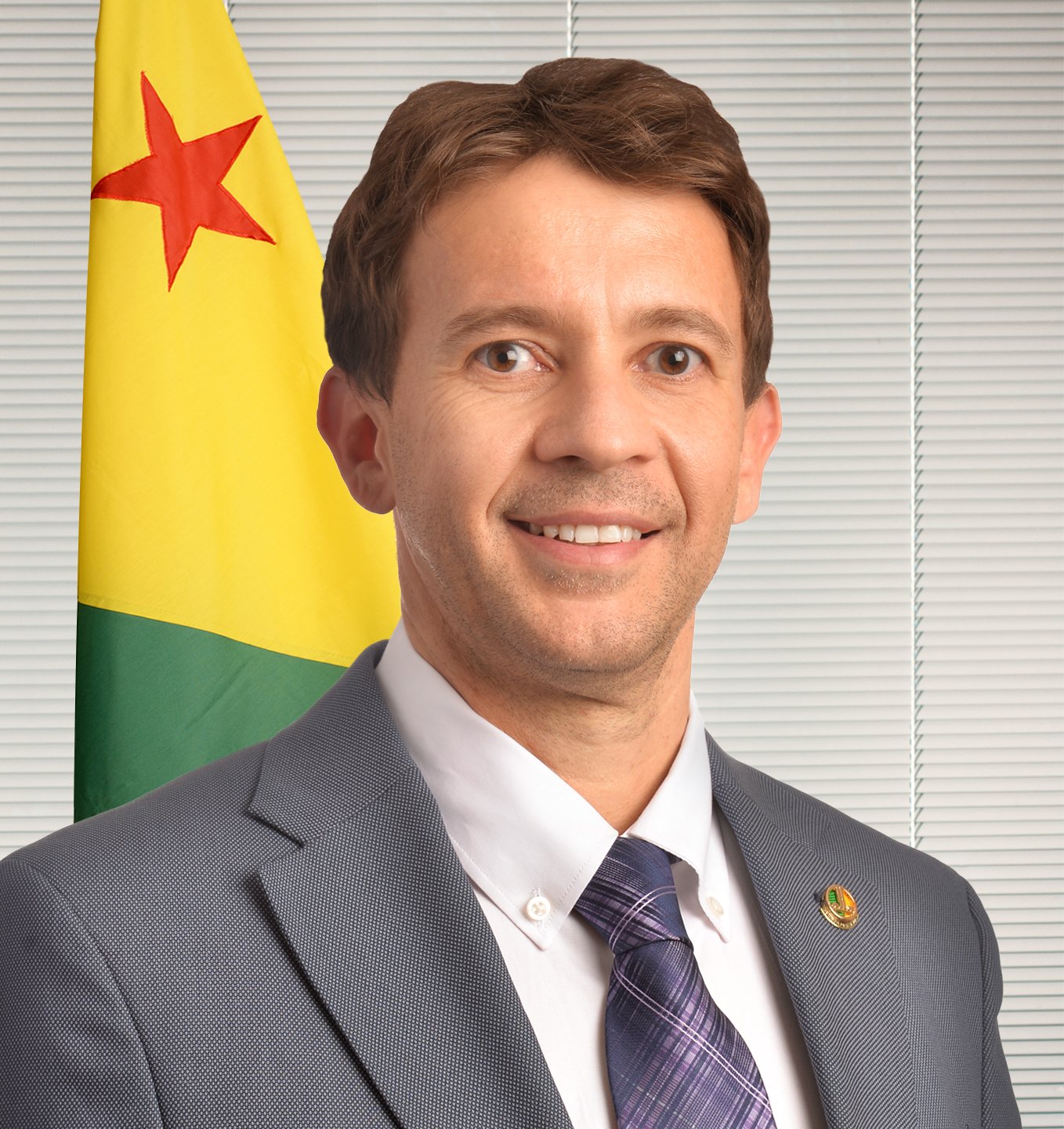
- Velloso in 2022

Member of the Chamber of Deputies
- Incumbent
- Assumed office 1 February 2023
- Constituency: Acre

Member of the Federal Senate
- In office 31 May 2022 – 14 October 2022
- Preceded by: Márcio Bittar
- Succeeded by: Márcio Bittar
- Constituency: Acre

Personal details
- Born: 8 July 1976 (age 50)
- Party: SD

Eduardo Ovídio Borges de Velloso Vianna (born 8 July 1976) is a Brazilian politician serving as a member of the Chamber of Deputies since 2023. In 2022, he was a member of the Federal Senate.
