= Flaviano Melo =

Brazilian politician (1949–2024)

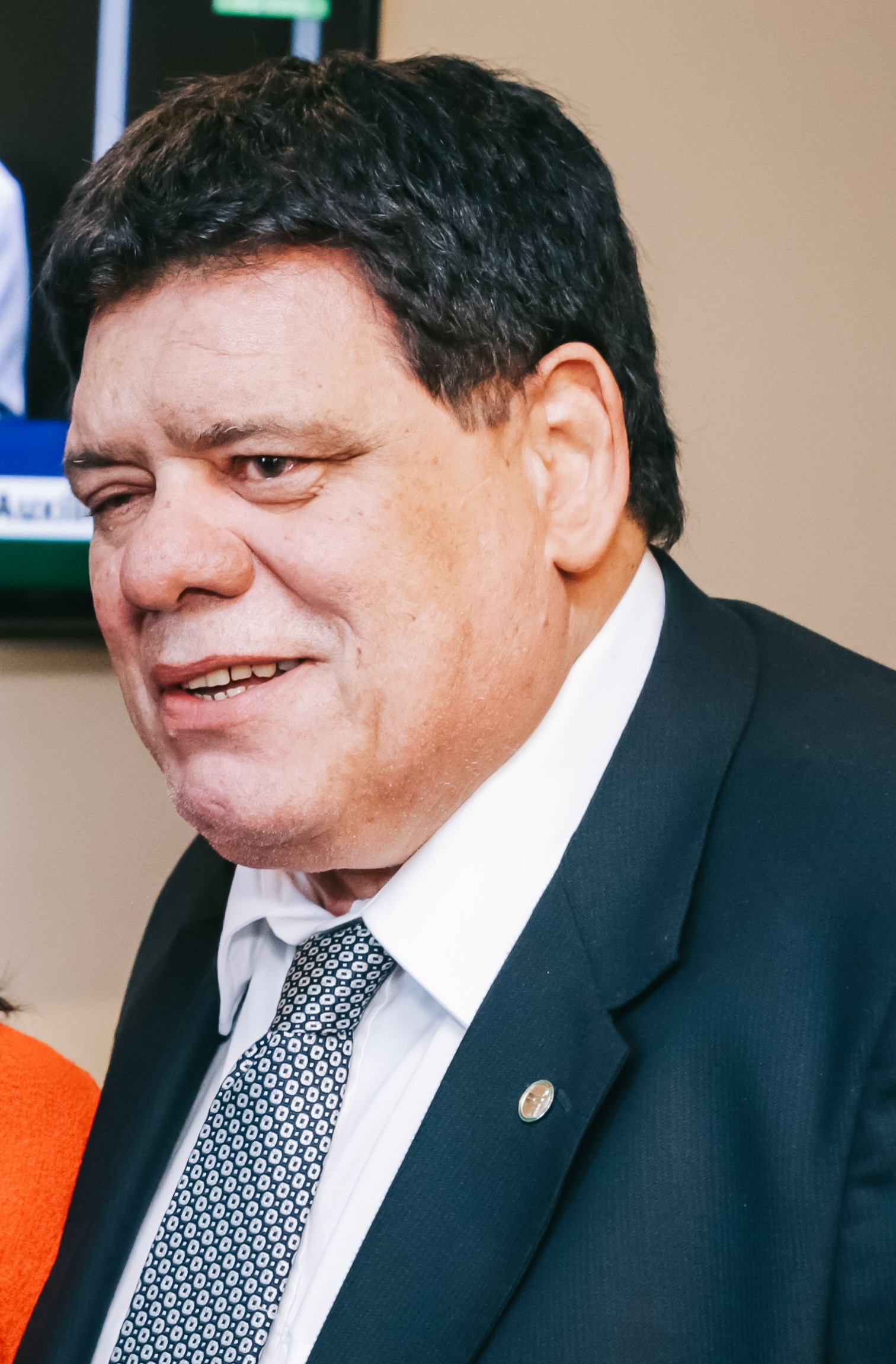
- Melo in 2022

Governor of Acre
- In office 15 March 1987 – 2 April 1990
- Preceded by: Iolanda Fleming
- Succeeded by: Édison Simão Cadaxo

Member of the Federal Senate of Brazil for Acre
- In office 1 February 1991 – 31 January 1999
- Preceded by: Mário Maia
- Succeeded by: Tião Viana

Member of the Chamber of Deputies of Brazil for Acre
- In office 1 February 2007 – 1 February 2023

Personal details
- Born: Flaviano Flávio Baptista de Melo; 17 November 1949 Rio Branco, Acre, Brazil
- Died: 20 November 2024 (aged 75) São Paulo, Brazil
- Party: MDB
- Education: Guanabara State University
- Occupation: Civil engineer

Flaviano Flávio Baptista de Melo (17 November 1949 – 20 November 2024) was a Brazilian civil engineer and politician. A member of the Brazilian Democratic Movement, he served as Governor of Acre from 1987 to 1990, as a senator from 1991 to 1999, and as a member of the Chamber of Deputies from 2007 to 2023.

Melo died of pneumonia in São Paulo, on 20 November 2024, at the age of 75.
