= Jorge Viana =

Brazilian engineer and politician

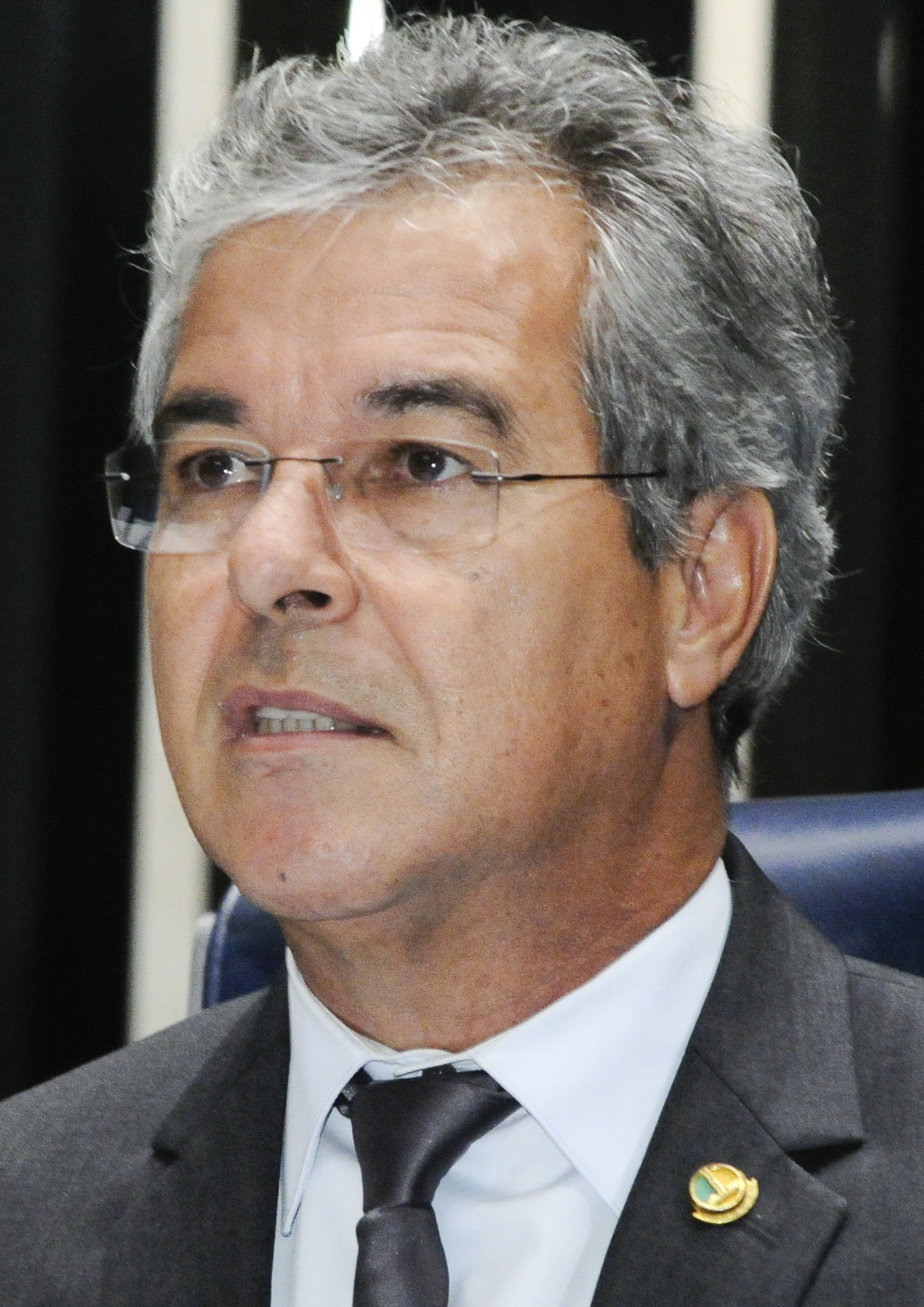

President of ApexBrasil
- Incumbent
- Assumed office 4 January 2023
- President: Luiz Inácio Lula da Silva
- Preceded by: Augusto Pestana

Senator for Acre
- In office 1 February 2011 – 1 February 2019

Governor of Acre
- In office 1 January 1999 – 1 January 2007
- Vice Governor: Édison Cadaxo; Binho Marques
- Preceded by: Orleir Cameli
- Succeeded by: Binho Marques

Mayor of Rio Branco
- In office 1 January 1993 – 1 January 1997
- Preceded by: Jorge Kalume
- Succeeded by: Mauri Sérgio

Personal details
- Born: Jorge Ney Viana Macedo Neves Rio Branco, Acre, Brazil
- Party: PT (1980–present)
- Relatives: Tião Viana (brother); Wildy Viana (father)
- Education: University of Brasília (BS)
- Profession: Forest engineer
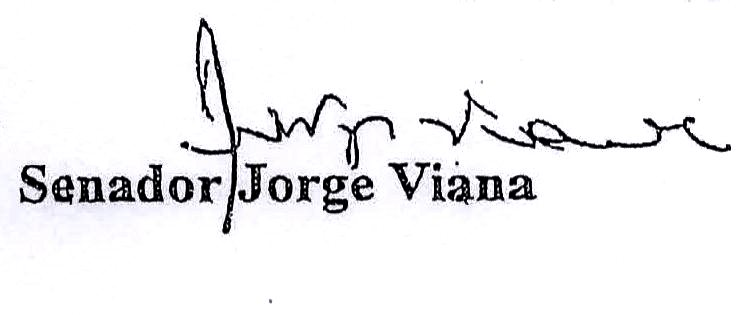
- Signature

Jorge Viana is a Brazilian engineer and politician. He has represented Acre in the Federal Senate since 2011. Previously, he was governor of Acre from 1999 to 2007. He is a member of the Workers' Party. After Renan Calheiros lost the presidency of the Senate, Viana is now the president of the Brazilian Senate.

He opposed the impeachment of President Dilma Rousseff.

Viana is also a member of Washington D.C.–based think tank, the Inter-American Dialogue.

== See also ==
- List of mayors of Rio Branco, Acre

Political offices
Preceded by Jorge Kalume	Mayor of Rio Branco; 1993–1997	Succeeded by Mauri Sérgio
Preceded by Orleir Cameli	Governor of Acre; 1999–2007	Succeeded by Binho Marques
Business positions
Preceded by Augusto Pestana	President of ApexBrasil; 2023–present	Incumbent
