= Geraldo Fleming =

Brazilian politician

Federal Deputy for Acre
- In office 1 February 1979 – 31 January 1983

State Deputy of Acre
- In office 1 February 1963 – 31 January 1979

Personal details
- Born: 25 July 1929 Campanha, Minas Gerais, Brazil
- Died: 13 June 1991 (aged 61) Rio Branco, Acre, Brazil
- Party: MDB (1966–1991)
- Other political affiliations: PTB (1961–1965)
- Spouse: Iolanda Fleming
- Education: Fluminense Federal University

Geraldo Reis Fleming (25 July 1929 – 13 June 1991) was a Brazilian military officer and politician.
