= Nicolau Júnior =

Brazilian politician (born 1984)

President of the Legislative Assembly of Acre
- Incumbent
- Assumed office 9 July 2024
- Preceded by: Luiz Gonzaga
- In office 1 February 2019 – 31 January 2023
- Preceded by: Ney Amorim
- Succeeded by: Luiz Gonzaga

Personal details
- Born: 8 September 1984 (age 41)
- Party: Progressistas

Nicolau Candido da Silva Júnior (born 8 September 1984), better known as Nicolau Júnior, is a Brazilian politician serving as a member of the Legislative Assembly of Acre since 2015. He has served as president of the assembly since 2024, having previously served from 2019 to 2023.
