= Sérgio Petecão =

Brazilian politician

- Official portrait

Senator for Acre
- Incumbent
- Assumed office 1 February 2011

Member of the Chamber of Deputies
- In office 1 February 2007 – 31 January 2011
- Constituency: Acre

State Deputy of Acre
- In office 1 January 1995 – 1 January 2007

President of the Legislative Assembly of Acre
- In office 1 January 1999 – 1 January 2007
- Preceded by: Alvaro Romero
- Succeeded by: Edvaldo Magalhães

Personal details
- Born: Sérgio de Oliveira Cunha; April 24, 1960 (age 66) Rio Branco, Acre, Brazil
- Party: PSD (2011–present)
- Other political affiliations: PMN (1990–2011)

Sérgio Petecão (born April 24, 1960) is a Brazilian politician. He has represented Acre in the Federal Senate since 2011. He is a member of the Social Democratic Party.

Political offices
Preceded by Alvaro Romero	President of the Legislative Assembly of Acre; 1999–2007	Succeeded by Edvaldo Magalhães
