= Mailza Gomes =

Brazilian politician

- Official portrait, 2019

Governor of Acre
- Incumbent
- Assumed office 2 April 2026
- Preceded by: Gladson Cameli

Vice Governor of Acre
- In office 1 January 2023 – 2 April 2026
- Governor: Gladson Cameli
- Preceded by: Wherles da Rocha

Senator for Acre
- In office 3 January 2019 – 1 January 2023
- Preceded by: Gladson Cameli
- Succeeded by: Alan Rick

Personal details
- Born: Mailza Assis da Silva; 10 December 1976 (age 49) Mundo Novo, Mato Grosso do Sul, Brazil (Note: At the time of foundation, the city was part of the state of Mato Grosso.)
- Party: PP (2016–present)
- Other political affiliations: PSDB (2007–2016)
- Education: Federal University of Acre (LL.B.)

Mailza Assis da Silva (born 10 December 1976), also known as Mailza Gomes, is a Brazilian politician serving as the governor of the state of Acre. Born in Mato Grosso do Sul, she has spent her political career representing Acre, previously serving as a state senator from 2019 to 2023 and Vice Governor from 2023 to 2026.

== Personal life ==
Gomes is married to James Gomes, the former mayor of Senador Guiomard. She is an alumnus of the Federal University of Acre. She has two children.

== Political career ==
When Gladson Cameli was elected to Federal Senate in 2014, Gomes was listed as the First Alternate on his ticket. Cameli then ran for and was elected governor of Acre in 2018, and she assumed his Senate seat when he resigned to become governor. Gomes was the fourth woman to serve in the federal senate from Acre, the others being Íris Célia Cabanellas, Laélia de Alcântara, and Marina Silva.

Gomes the joined Cameli's successful reelection ticket as Vice-Governor candidate in 2022, and she took office in 2023 at the start of Cameli's second term. In April, Cameli resigned as the governor in preparation for another Federal Senate run, and Gomes took his place in the governor's office. She ran for a full gubernatorial term in the 2026 election, and was elected in the second round runoff with 66.21% of the vote.

== Notes ==
Political offices
Preceded by Wherles da Rocha	Vice Governor of Acre; 2023–2026	Vacant
Preceded by Gladson Cameli	Governor of Acre; 2026–present	Incumbent
