= 2014 Acre general election =

2014 Acre gubernatorial election
- October 5, 2014
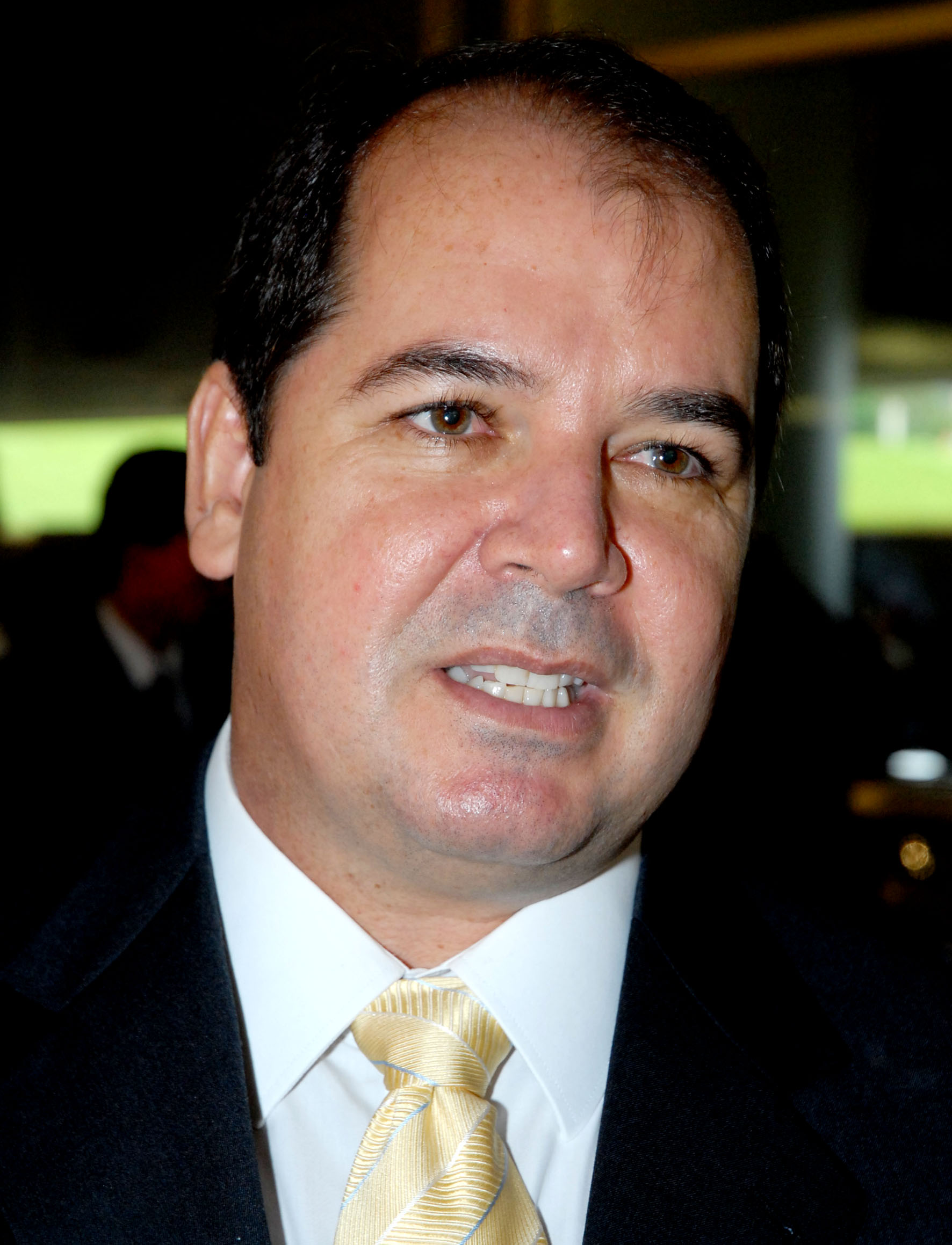
Nominee	Tião Viana	Márcio Bittar	Tião Bocalom
Party	PT	PSDB	DEM
Running mate	Nazareth Lambert	Antonia Sales	Henrique Afonso
Governor before election
Tião Viana
PT
Elected Governor
TBD

The first round of the Acre gubernatorial election was held on 5 October 2014 to elect the next governor of the state of Acre. No candidate won 50% of the vote and thus a second-round runoff election was held on 26 October. Governor Tião Viana was re-elected for a second term.

== Candidates ==
- Tião Viana 13 (PT) - incumbent Governor (elected in 2010); former Senator (1999-2010)
  - Nazareth Lambert 13 (PT)
- Bocalom 25 (DEM) - former Mayor of Acrelândia (elected in 1992, 2000, 2004)
  - Henrique Afonso 25 (PV) - Federal Deputy (elected in 2002, 2006, 2010); former City Councillor, Cruzeiro do Sul (elected in 1996)
- Márcio Bittar 45 (PSDB) - Federal Deputy (elected in 1998, 2010)
  - Antonia Sales 45 (PMDB) - State Deputy (elected in 2010)
- Antonio Rocha 50 (PSOL)
  - Dany Mendonça 50 (PSOL)

=== Coalitions ===
Candidate	Running mate	Coalition
Tião Viana; PT	Nazareth Lambert; PT	"Frente Popular do Acre" (PT, PDT, PRB, PSL, PTN, PSDC, PHS, PSB, PRP, PEN, PPL, PCdoB, PROS, PTB)
Tião Bocalom; DEM	Henrique Afonso; PV	"Produzir Para Empregar" (DEM, PV, PMN)
Márcio Bittar; PSDB	Antonia Sales; PMDB	"Aliança Por Um Acre Melhor" (PSDB, PMDB, PTdoB, PSC, PTC, PPS, PR, SD, PP, PSD)
Antônio Rocha; PSOL	Dany Mendonça; PSOL	-

== Opinion Polling ==
Date	Institute	Candidate				Blank/Null/Undecided
Date	Institute	Tião Viana (PT)	Márcio Bittar (PSDB)	Tião Bocalom (DEM)	Antônio Rocha (PSOL)	Blank/Null/Undecided
September 29–October 1, 2014	Ibope	50%	24%	24.3%	2%	-
September 29–October 1, 2014	Ibope	47%	23%	23%	2%	6%
September 21–26, 2014	Delta	42.24%	26.04%	19.12%	1.20%	11.40%
September 14–16, 2014	Vox Populi	51%	17%	21%	1%	10%
September 9–11, 2014	Ibope	42%	19%	25%	2%	12%
August 31–September 5, 2014	Delta	40.4%	24.08%	16.68%	1.16%	17.68%
August 30–September 2, 2014	Vox Populi	48%	17%	18%	1%	15%
August 10–14, 2014	Phoenix	29.1%	17.5%	35.9%	2.3%	15.2%
August 8–10, 2014	Ibope	46%	19%	18%	2%	15%
July 30–August 5, 2014	Delta	41.84%	19.64%	17.04%	0.48%	15.92%
July 26–29, 2014	Vox Populi	49%	18%	20%	1%	12%

== Results ==
Acre gubernatorial election, 2014
Party	Candidate	Votes	%	±%
PT	Tião Viana	193,253	49.73	
PSDB	Márcio Bittar	116,948	30.10	
DEM	Bocalom	76,218	19.61%	
PSOL	Antonio Rocha	2,171	0.56	
Total formal votes		388,590	92.79	
Turnout		418,772		

Acre gubernatorial runoff
Party	Candidate	Votes	%	±%
PT	Tião Viana	196,509	51.29%	
PSDB	Marcio Bittar	186,658	48.71%	
PT hold		Swing		
