= Coronel Ulysses =

Brazilian politician (born 1972)

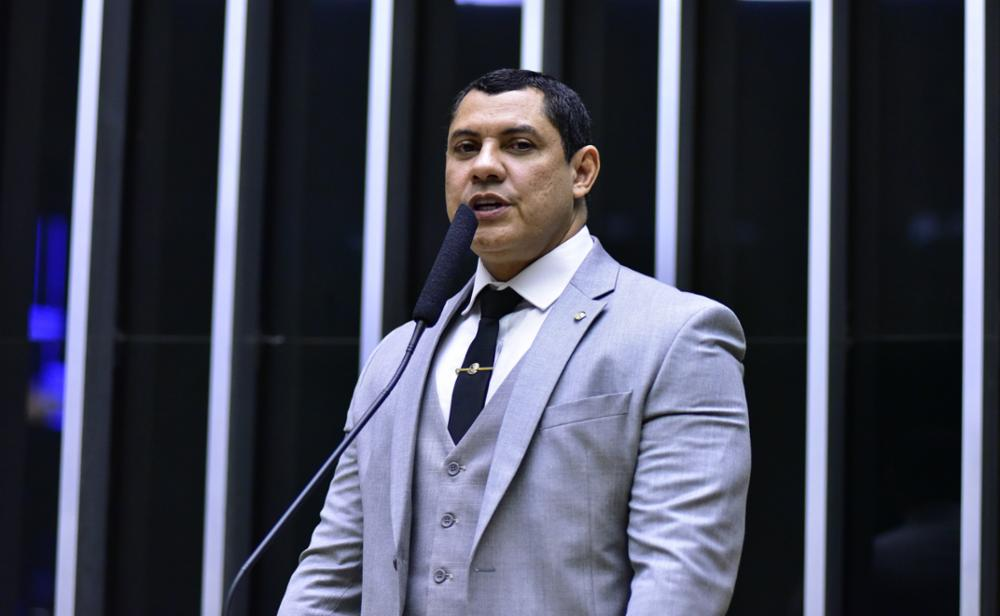
- Ulysses in 2023

Member of the Chamber of Deputies
- Incumbent
- Assumed office 1 February 2023
- Constituency: Acre

Personal details
- Born: Ulysses Freitas Pereira de Araújo; 19 October 1972 (age 54) Cruzeiro do Sul, Acre, Brazil
- Party: UNIÃO (since 2022)

Military service
- Allegiance: Military Police of Acre State
- Rank: Colonel

Ulysses Freitas Pereira de Araújo, better known as Coronel Ulysses (born 19 October 1972), is a Brazilian politician serving as a member of the Chamber of Deputies since 2023. From 2019 to 2020, he served as commandant-general of the Military Police of Acre State. In the 2018 gubernatorial election, he was a candidate for governor of Acre.
