= 2024 Rio Branco mayoral election =

- October 6, 2024
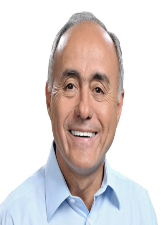

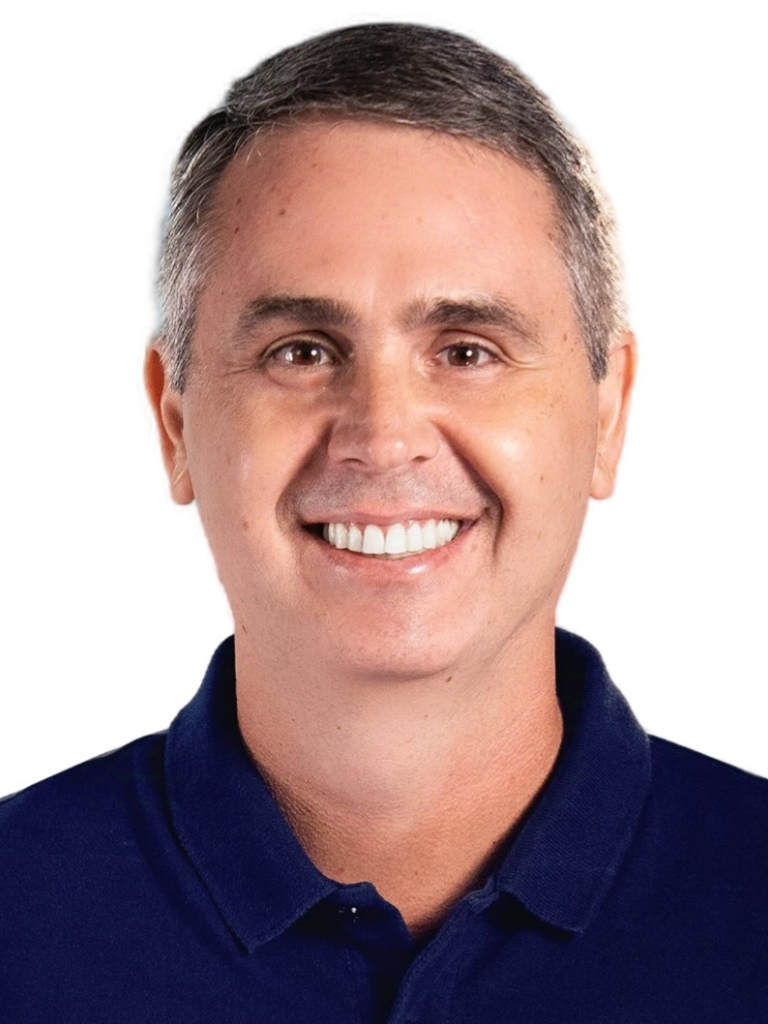
Nominee	Tião Bocalom	Marcus Alexandre
Party	PL	MDB
Alliance	Produce for Jobs	Let's Go Rio Branco
Running mate	Alysson Bestene	Marfisa Galvão
Popular vote	108,605	68,884
Percentage	54.82%	34.77%
Mayor before election
Tião Bocalom
PL
Elected mayor
Tião Bocalom
PL

The 2024 Rio Branco municipal election took place in the city of Rio Branco, Brazil on 6 October 2024. Voters elected a mayor, vice mayor, and 21 councillors.

The incumbent mayor is Tião Bocalom of the PL. Bocalom was formerly elected mayor in 2020 as a member of the PP.

Bocalom defeated the former mayor of the city, Marcus Alexandre in the first round.

Popular vote (first round)
Bocalom	54.82%
Alexandre	34.77%
Jarude	7.16%
Dr. Jenilson	3.24%
