= Socorro Neri =

Brazilian politician (born 1966)

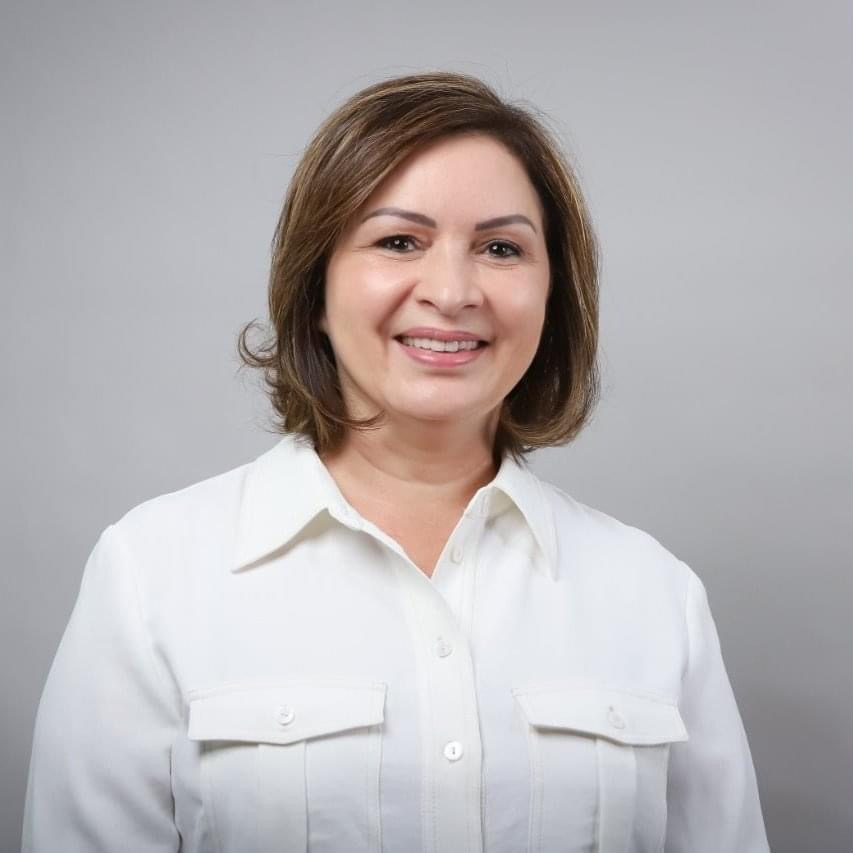
- Neri in 2021

Member of the Chamber of Deputies
- Incumbent
- Assumed office 1 February 2023
- Constituency: Acre

Mayor of Rio Branco
- In office 6 April 2018 – 1 January 2021
- Vice Mayor: Vacant
- Preceded by: Marcus Alexandre
- Succeeded by: Tião Bocalom

Vice Mayor of Rio Branco
- In office 1 January 2017 – 6 April 2018
- Mayor: Marcus Alexandre
- Preceded by: Márcio Batista
- Succeeded by: Marfisa Galvão

Personal details
- Born: Maria do Socorro Neri Medeiros de Souza; 19 May 1966 (age 60) Tarauacá, Acre, Brazil
- Party: PP (since 2022)
- Other political affiliations: PPS (2005–2012, 2013–2015); PSDB (2012–2013, 2015–2016); PSB (2016–2022)
- Parent: Adelaide Neri (mother)
- Education: Federal University of Acre
- Profession: Teacher

Maria do Socorro Neri Medeiros de Souza (born 19 May 1966) is a Brazilian politician serving as a member of the Chamber of Deputies since 2023. From 2018 to 2020, she served as mayor of Rio Branco. She served as vice-rector of the Federal University of Acre.

Political offices
Preceded by Márcio Batista	Vice Mayor of Rio Branco; 2017–2018	Vacant Title next held by Marfisa Galvão
Preceded by Marcus Alexandre	Mayor of Rio Branco; 2018–2021	Succeeded by Tião Bocalom
