= Alan Rick =

Brazilian politician (born 1976)

- Official portrait

Senator for Acre
- Incumbent
- Assumed office 1 February 2023
- Preceded by: Mailza Gomes

Member of the Chamber of Deputies
- In office 1 February 2015 – 31 January 2023
- Constituency: Acre

Personal details
- Born: Alan Rick Miranda; 23 October 1976 (age 49) Rio Branco, Acre, Brazil
- Party: UNIÃO (2022–present)
- Other political affiliations: DEM (2017–2022); Republicanos (2013–2017); PSB (2007–2013)

Alan Rick Miranda (born 23 October 1976), more commonly known as Alan Rick, is a Brazilian politician as well as a journalist, and television personality. He has spent his political career representing Acre, who had served as a federal deputy representative from 2015 to 2023 and as a senator since 2023.

== Personal life ==
Rick is the son of Antonio Milton Miranda and Maria Gorete Costa de Moraes da Silva. He holds a postgraduate in political journalism, and prior to becoming a politician he worked as a television presenter, business manager, and journalist. Rick is the pastor of the Forest Evangelical Baptist Church in Rio Branco. He is married to Michele Miranda, whom he wed in 2009.

== Political career ==
In the 2014 Brazilian general election Rick was elected to the Federal Chamber of Deputies with 17,903 votes. He was elected under the banner of the Brazilian Republican Party, the first ever politician elected of that party from Acre, although he switched to the Democrats in 2017. He was reelected in the 2018 election 22,263 votes (or 5,24% of all the valid votes cast).

Rick voted in favor of the impeachment motion of then-president Dilma Rousseff. He voted in favor of tax reforms and the 2017 Brazilian labor reform, and in favor of opening a corruption investigation into Rousseff's successor Michel Temer.

As with many politicians affiliated with the PRB, Rick is considered socially conservative. His main themes in his election campaign was based on defense of Christian morals and family values.
