= Gladson Cameli =

Brazilian politician and engineer

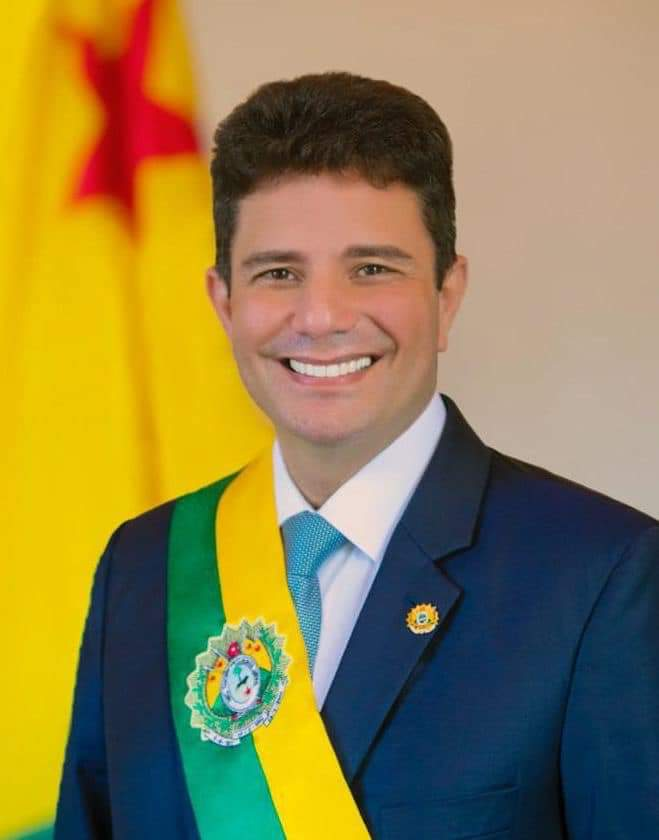

Governor of Acre
- In office 1 January 2019 – 1 April 2026
- Vice Governor: Wherles da Rocha (2019–2023); Mailza Gomes (2023–2026)
- Preceded by: Tião Viana
- Succeeded by: Mailza Gomes

Senator for Acre
- In office 1 February 2015 – 1 January 2019

Member of the Chamber of Deputies
- In office 1 February 2007 – 31 January 2015
- Constituency: Acre

Personal details
- Born: Gladson de Lima Cameli; 26 March 1978 (age 48) Cruzeiro do Sul, Acre, Brazil
- Party: PP (2005–present)
- Other political affiliations: PFL (2000–2003); PPS (2003–2005)
- Profession: Engineer

Gladson de Lima Cameli (born 26 March 1978) is a Brazilian politician and engineer. Cameli was the Governor of Acre from 2019 to 2026 and represented Acre in the Federal Senate from 2015 to 2019. Previously, he was a deputy from Acre from 2007 to 2015. He is a member of the Progressistas party (PP). He has been implicated in the Petrobras scandal and in 2026 was sentenced to prison for criminal organization and corruption.

== Biography ==
Gladson Cameli, son of Eládio Messias Cameli and Maria Lindomar de Lima Cameli, attended elementary school at Escola São José, in Cruzeiro do Sul, his hometown, between 1985 and 1992. In Manaus, he attended high school at Instituto Batista do Amazonas (IBA), completed in 1995. At the age of 19, he was trained in fluency in English by the EF International School of English, in the UK, and started a course in Civil Engineering at the Lutheran Institute of Higher Education in Manaus, completed in 2001. Married to lawyer Ana Paula Correia da Silva Cameli and father of Guilherme Correia Cameli, Gladson became a partner at Marmud Cameli Cia Ltda, his family's company, in 1997. In addition, the former senator also served as Technical Responsible of Construtora ETAM Ltda of Manaus in 2005.

== Political career ==
Gladson Cameli, a member of the Municipal Youth Council, joined the PFL during (2000–2003) and the PPS during (2003–2005). However, he began his political trajectory at the age of 28 as a member of the PP, in which he joined in 2005, elected for the first time to the mandate of federal deputy (2007–2011) with 18,886 votes. In the 2010 elections, he was re-elected as deputy (2011–2015) with more than 30 thousand votes. In October 2009, he was awarded the title of Citizen Rio Branquense by the City Council of Rio Branco / AC.

Cameli ran for Senate in Acre in 2014, winning his election with about 218,756 votes. In 2016, the then senator voted in favor of the impeachment of then-President Dilma Rousseff and the PEC on the Ceiling of Public Spending. Gladson also voted in favor of labor reform in July 2017, and stood against Aécio Neves' impeachment on the Senate's ethics board.

Cameli ran for Governor of Acre in 2018. He won his election in the first round, defeating candidates Marcus Alexandre (PT), Coronel Ulysses (PSL), Janaína Furtado (REDE) and David Hall (Avante). Cameli's victory broke the existing PT hegemony in the state of Acre for about 20 years. In April 2026, Cameli resigned his post in preparation for a Senate run, and Vice Governor Maliza Gomes assumed the post of governor, as dictated by constitutional succession rules. However, just a month later, the Superior Court of Justice sentenced Cameli to 25 years and nine months in prison on charges including embezzlement and corruption. This conviction disqualified him from running for office for eight years.

Cameli's political career is marked by family political heritage, as he is the nephew of former state governor Orleir Cameli, who served from 1995 and 1999.

Political offices
Preceded by Tião Viana	Governor of Acre; 2019–2026	Succeeded by Mailza Gomes
