= Acrelândia =

Municipality of Acre, Brazil

- Municipality
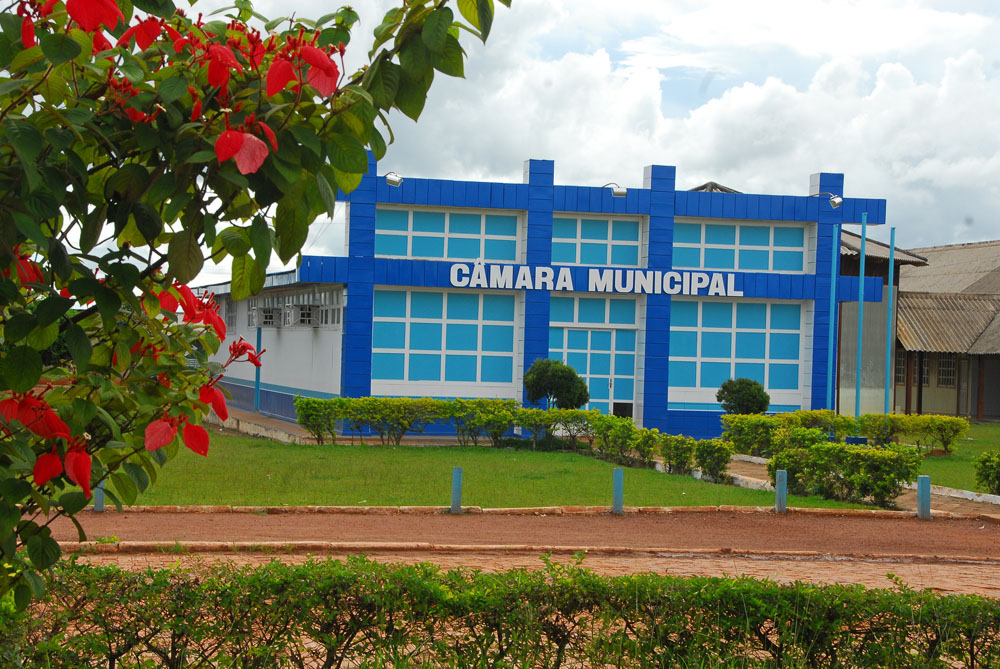
- Municipal council building of Acrelândia

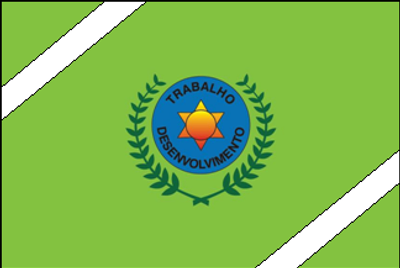
- Flag Coat of arms

- Location of Acrelândia in Acre

- Location within Brazil Location within South America
- Coordinates: 10°4′23″S 67°3′14″W
- Country: Brazil
- Region: North
- State: Acre
- Founded: 28 April 1992

Government
  - Mayor: Olavo Francelino de Rezende (Republicanos) (2025-2028)
  - Vice Mayor: Eraides Caetano de Souza (UNIÃO) (2025-2028)

Area
  - Total: 1,811.613 km^{2} (699.468 sq mi)
- Elevation: 25 m (82 ft)

Population (2022)
  - Total: 14,021
  - Density: 7.74/km^{2} (20.0/sq mi)
- Demonym: Acrelandense (Brazilian Portuguese)
- Time zone: UTC-05:00 (Acre Time)
- Postal code: 69945-000
- HDI (2010): 0.604 – medium
- Website: acrelandia.ac.gov.br

Acrelândia (Brazilian Portuguese pronunciation: [akɾeˈlɐ̃dʒi.ɐ]) is a municipality located in the easternmost portion of the Brazilian state of Acre. Its population is 15,490 and its area is 1,808 km^{2}, which makes it the smallest municipality in that state.

== Demographics ==
Historical population
Year	Pop.	±%
2000	7,934	—
2010	12,538	+58.0%
2022	14,021	+11.8%

== Gallery ==
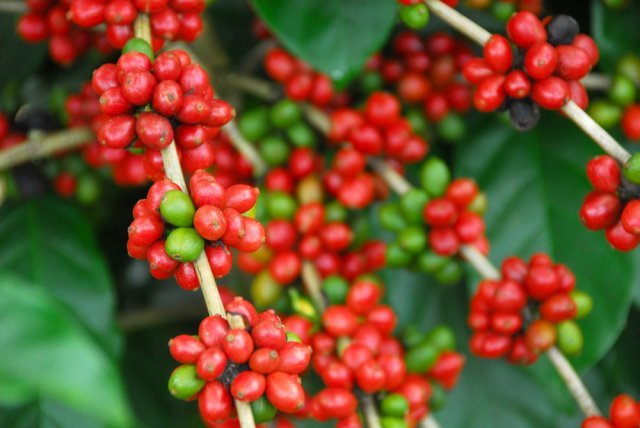
Coffee plants grown in Acrelândia

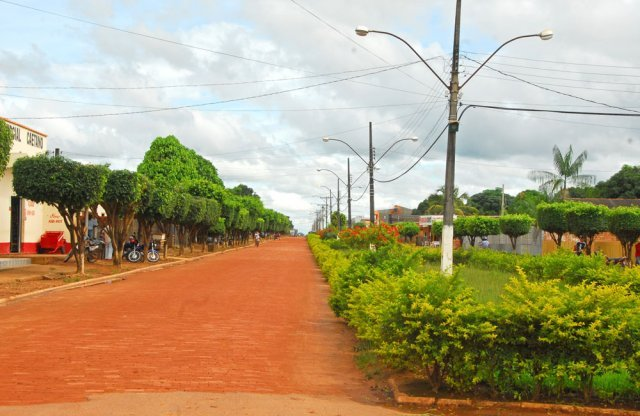
Road in Acrelândia

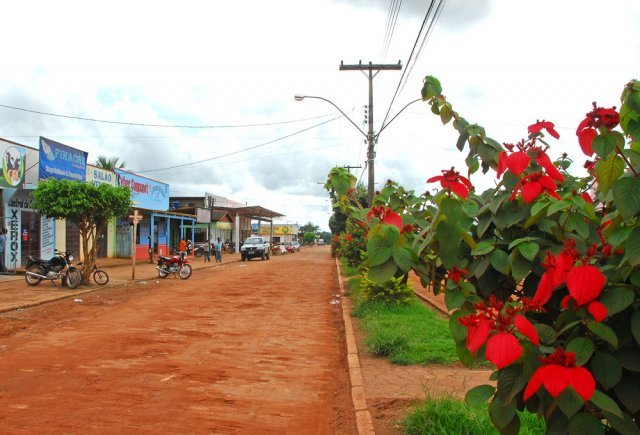
Road in Acrelândia

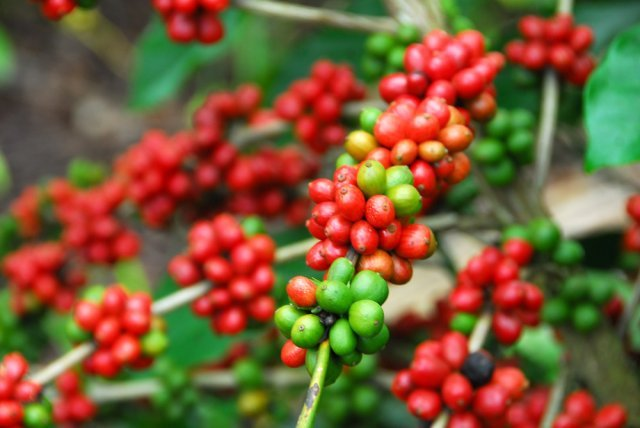
Coffee plants grown in Acrelândia

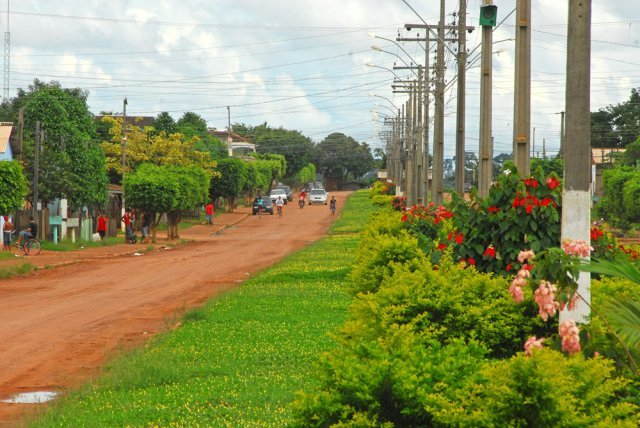
Road in Acrelândia

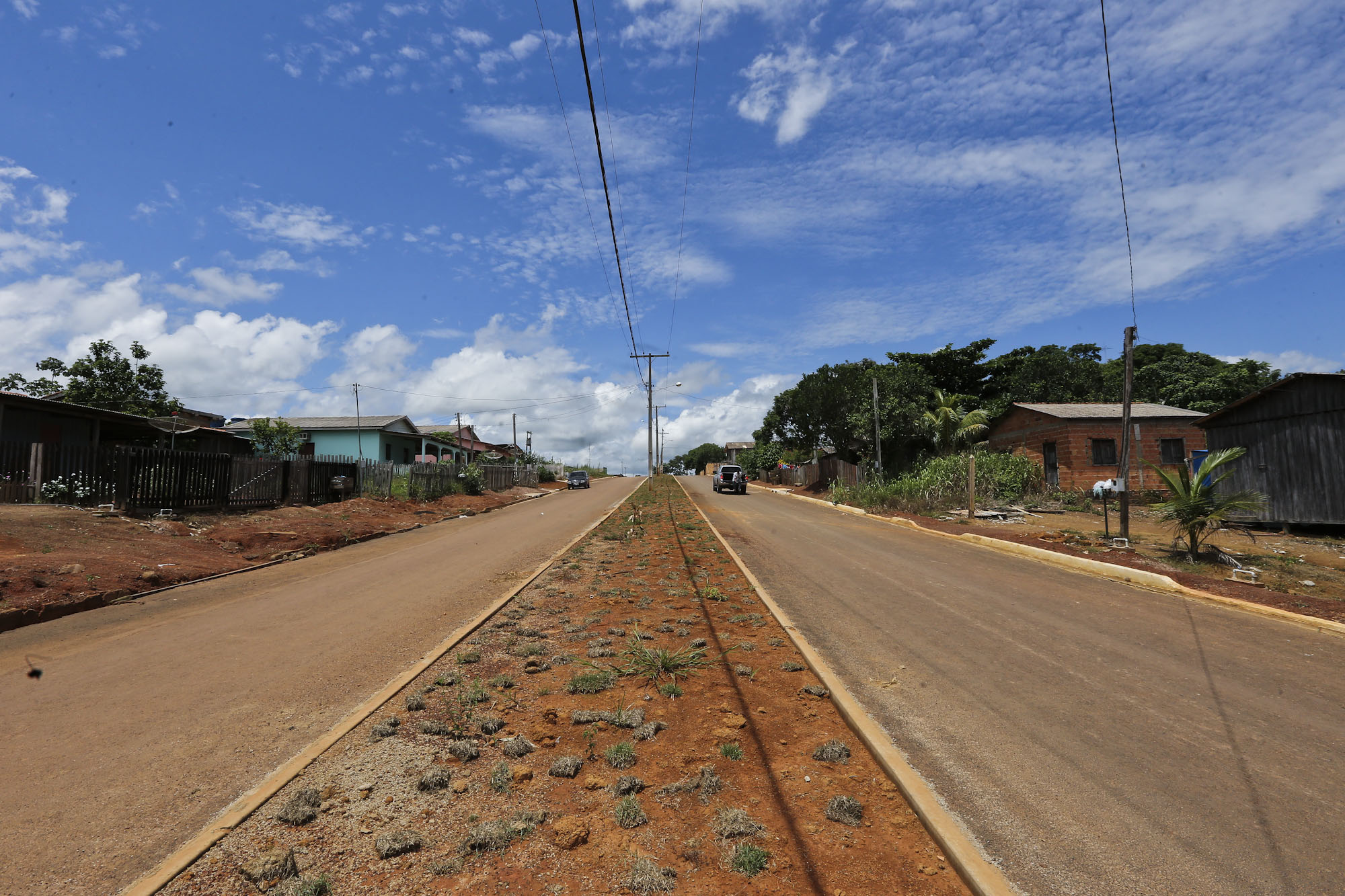
Road in Acrelândia

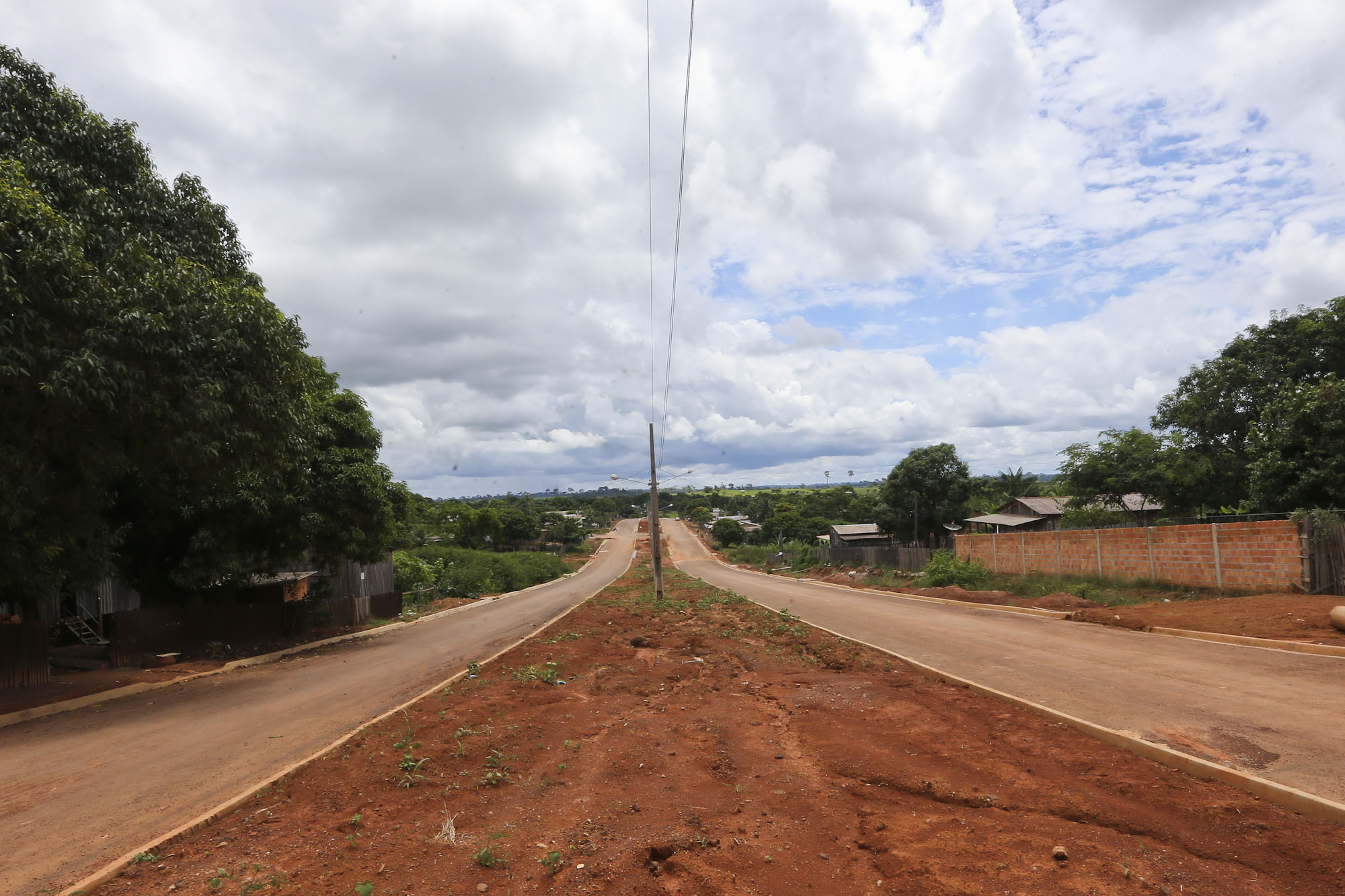
Road in Acrelândia

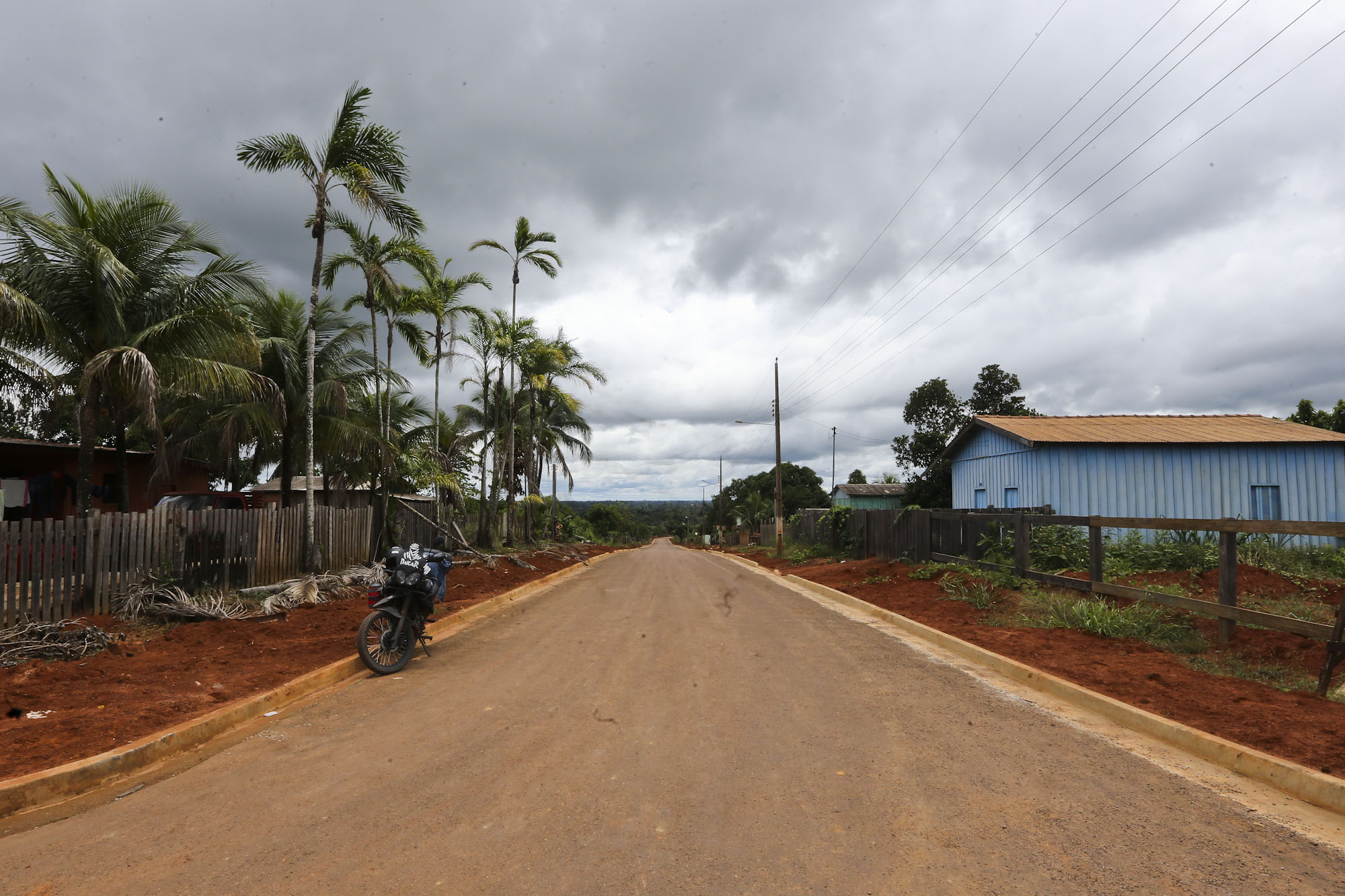
Road in Acrelândia

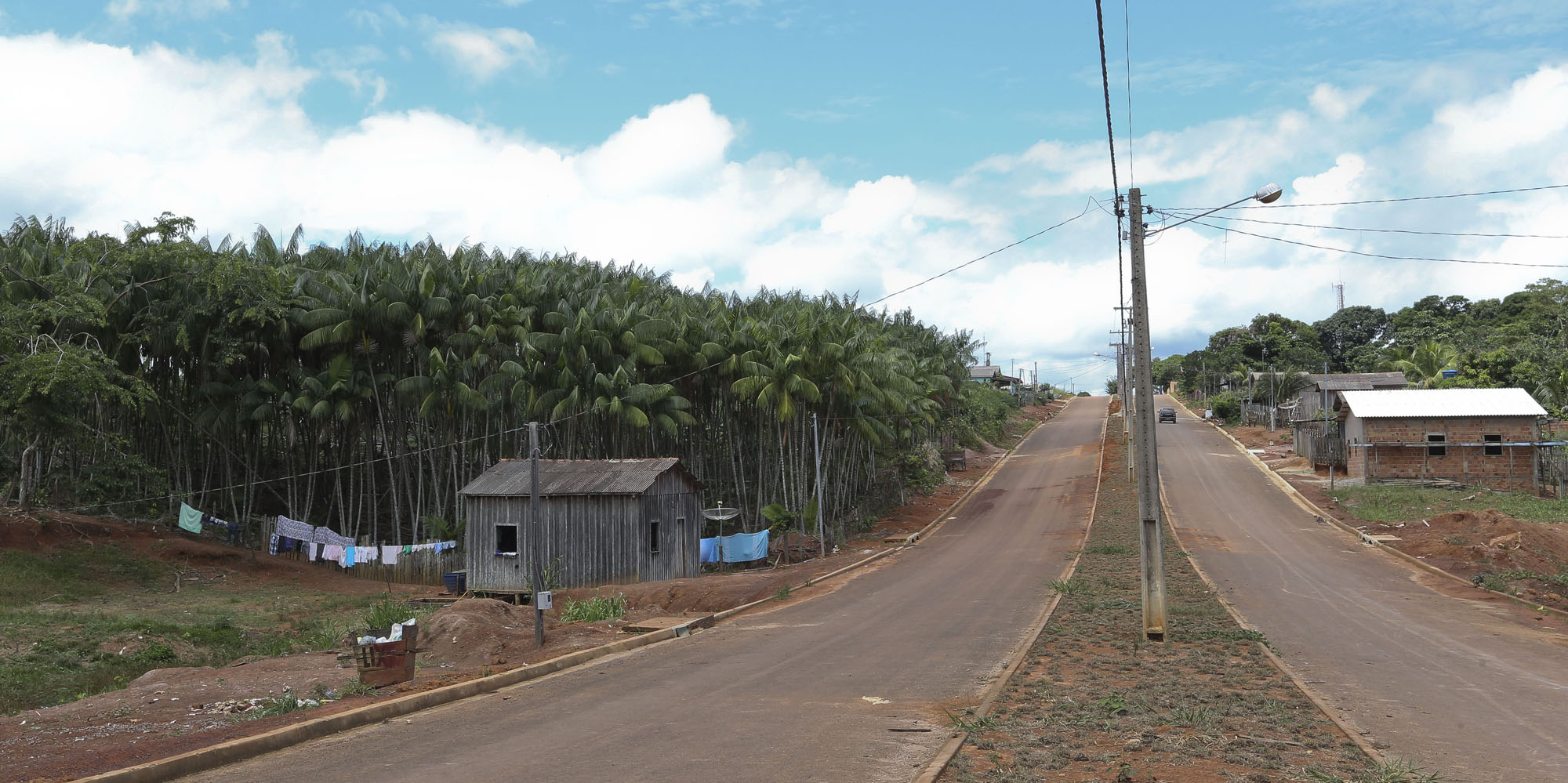
Road in Acrelândia

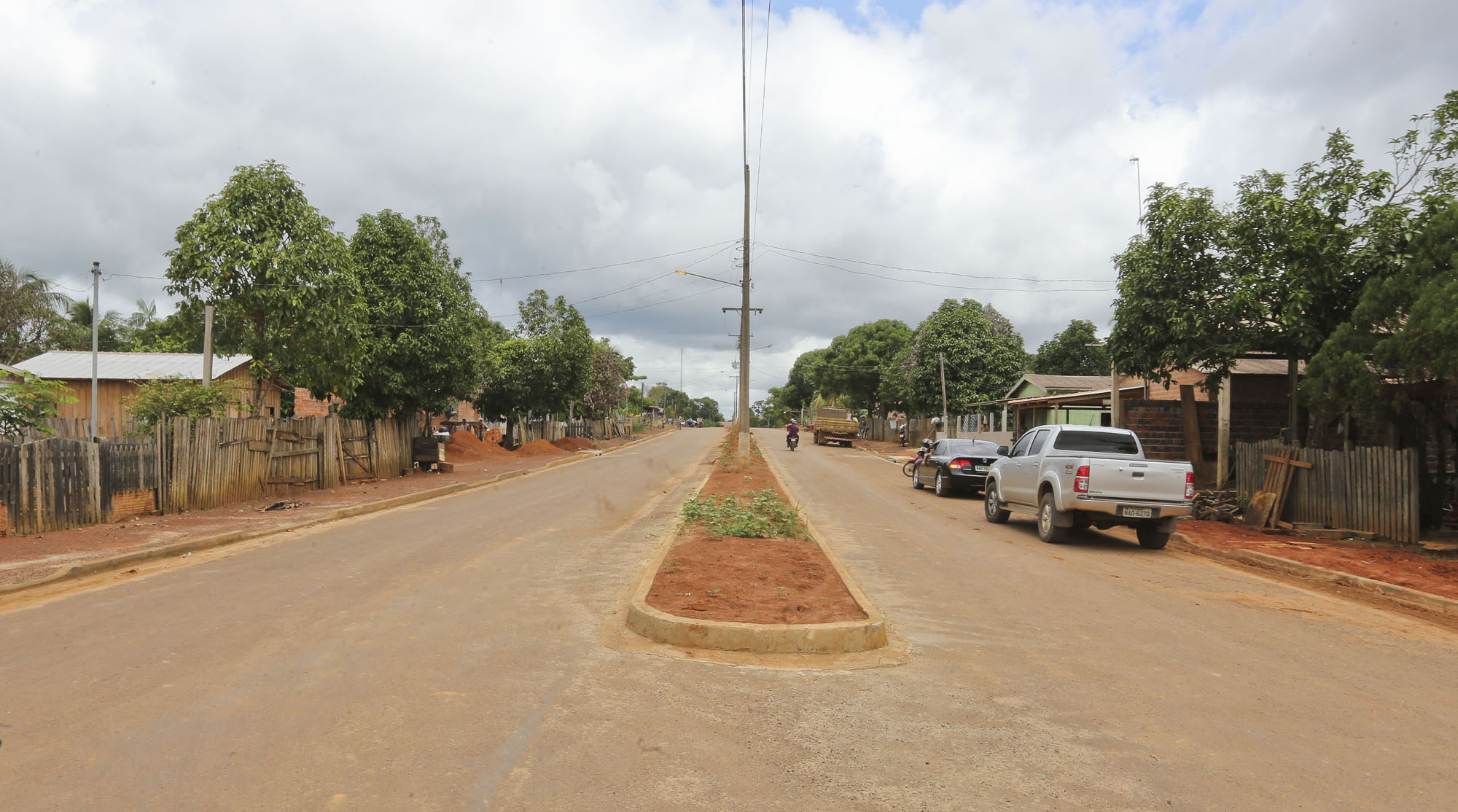
Road in Acrelândia
