= Jorge Kalume =

Brazilian politician

Personal details
- Born: 3 December 1920 Belém, Brazil
- Died: October 26, 2010 (aged 89) Brasília, Brazil

Jorge Kalume (3 December 1920 – 26 October 2010) was a Brazilian politician.

Jorge Kalume was born on 3 December 1920 in Belém, a city in the Brazilian Amazon, to a Syrian father, and a Lebanese mother. He was governor of Acre from 1966 to 1971, during the military regime. He served as senator for Acre from 1979 to 1987.

He died of bowel cancer in Brasília on 26 October 2010.

== See also ==
- List of mayors of Rio Branco, Acre
