= Márcio Bittar =

Brazilian politician (born 1963)

- Official portrait

Senator for Acre
- Incumbent
- Assumed office 1 February 2019

Member of the Chamber of Deputies
- In office 1 February 2011 – 1 February 2019
- Constituency: Acre
- In office 1 February 1999 – 1 February 2003
- Constituency: Acre

Member of the Legislative Assembly of Acre
- In office 1 January 1995 – 1 January 1999
- Constituency: At-large

Personal details
- Born: 28 June 1963 (age 63) Franca, São Paulo, Brazil
- Party: PL (2025–present)
- Other political affiliations: PMDB (1981–1999); PPS (1999–2009); PSDB (2009–2017); MDB (2017–2021); PSL (2021–2022); UNIÃO (2022–2025)
- Profession: Farmer, political scientist

Márcio Miguel Bittar (born 28 June 1963) is a Brazilian politician. Although born in São Paulo, he has spent his political career representing Acre, serving as federal senator since 2019. He was previously served in the chamber of deputies from 1991 to 2003 and from 2011 to 2015, and served in the state legislature from 1995 to 1999.

== Personal life ==
Bittar was born in Franca to Mamédio Bittar and Manife Miguel Bittar. He grew up in Cuiabá and Jauru in the state of Mato Grosso. In his youth he was part of several militant leftist communist and socialists groups, but in his university years he joined the center-right PMDB. Bittar is married to Márcia Bittar, and is the father of 4 children and as of 2018 lives in Rio Branco. Before becoming a politician he worked as a farmer, and political scientist.

== Political career ==
Bittar served as state deputy in the state legislature of Acre from 1995 to 1999. He was then elected to and served in the Chamber of Deputies for three consecutive terms from 1991 to 2003. From 1997 to 2003 he was the vice-leader of the Popular Socialist Party in the federal legislature.

Bittar returned to the lower house for one term from 2011 to 2014, but elected not to run for re-election but instead run for governor of Acre. In the second round of the 2014 election though he narrowly lost by around 10,000 votes to eventual winner Tião Viana.

In 2017 after having disagreements with his then political party the PSDB, Bittar rejoined the PMDB. In the 2018 Brazilian general election Bittar was elected to the federal senate, coincidentally beating Viana who was also running for a seat in the senate.

Despite his early left-wing involvement, today politically Bittar is considered strongly economically liberal and socially conservative. Ideologically Bittar identifies himself as a liberal conservative. Highly critical of the Workers' Party's handling of the economy, Bittar was a vocal supporter of limiting government spending and the 2017 Brazil labor reform. Bittar was a supporter of Jair Bolsonaro's presidential campaign, who in turn endorsed Bittar in his senate race.
