= Orleir Cameli =

Brazilian politician and businessman

Orleir Messias Cameli
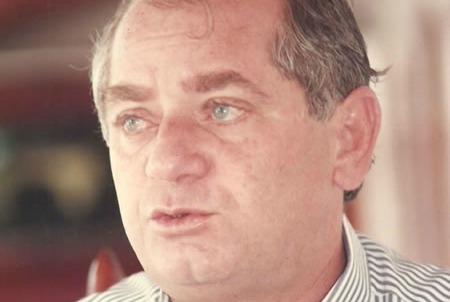
- A portrait of Orleir Messias Cameli

Governor of Acre
- In office 1 January 1995 – 1 January 1999

Personal details
- Born: 16 March 1949 Cruzeiro do Sul, Acre
- Died: 8 May 2013 (aged 64) Manaus, Amazonas
- Profession: Businessman

Orleir Messias Camel (16 March 1949 - 8 May 2013) was a Brazilian politician and businessman who held the office Governor of Acre from 1995 to 1999.

Born in Cruzeiro do Sul, he later became the mayor between 1993 and 1994.

At the time of his election as Governor of Acre, he was affiliated with the Progressive Reform Party.

He is the uncle of Brazilian politician and engineer Gladson Cameli.
