= List of governors of Acre =

This is the list of governors of the Brazilian state of Acre.

== Governors elected during the Fourth Republic ==
#	Name	Took office	Left office	Party	Notes	Photo
1	José Augusto de Araújo	March 1, 1963	May 8, 1964	PTB	First elected governor of Acre.	none available

== Governors appointed by the military ==
#	Name	Took office	Left office	Appointed by	Party	Notes	Photo
2	Edgard Pedreira Cerqueira Filho	May 8, 1964		elected by State Assembly			none available
3	Joaquim Macedo	March 15, 1979	March 15, 1983	João Figueiredo			none available

== Governors elected during the Sixth Republic ==
#	Name	Took office	Left office	Party	Notes	Photo
8	Nabor Júnior	March 15, 1983	March 15, 1986	PMDB		none available
9	Iolanda Fleming	March 15, 1986	March 15, 1987	PMDB	First female governor of a Brazilian state.	
10	Flaviano Melo	March 15, 1987	March 2, 1989	PMDB		
11	Édison Simão Cadaxo	March 2, 1989	March 15, 1991	PMDB		none available
13	Edmundo Pinto	March 15, 1991	May 17, 1992	PDS	Died in office.	
14	Orleir Messias Cameli	January 1, 1995	January 1, 1999	PPR		
15	Jorge Viana	January 1, 1999	January 1, 2007	PT	First re-elected governor of Acre.	
16	Binho Marques	January 1, 2007	January 1, 2011	PT		
17	Tião Viana	January 1, 2011	January 1, 2019	PT	Re-elected in 2014	
18	Gladson Cameli	January 1, 2019	present	PP	elected in 2018	
