= Federal University of Acre =

University in Brazil

Coordinates: 9.9754°S 67.8312°W

- Universidade Federal do Acre
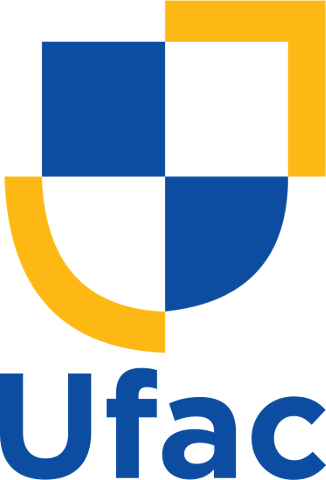
- University's Logo
- Other name: UFAC
- Type: Public
- Established: 1964
- Affiliations: CRUB, RENEX
- Budget: R$ 274.335.519,59 (2012)
- Chancellor: Minoro Martins Kinpara
- Vice-Chancellor: Margarida de Aquino Cunha
- Location: Rio Branco, Acre, Brazil
- Campus: Rio Branco, Cruzeiro do Sul, Brasiléia
- Website: http://www.ufac.edu.br
- Location in Brazil

The Federal University of Acre (Portuguese: Universidade Federal do Acre, UFAC) is a Brazilian university with headquarters in Rio Branco, Acre.

The university was founded as a law school in 1964, was reorganized as a university in 1971, and was federalized in 1974. Its enrollment is over 10,000 students in undergraduate and post-graduate programs.

== Undergraduate programs ==
- Agronomy Engineering
- Biology
- Brazilian Sign Language (LIBRAS)
- Chemistry
- Civil Engineering
- Collective Health
- Communication: Journalism
- Economics
- Electrical Engineering (Power Systems, Electronics and Telecommunications)
- Geography
- History
- Languages and Literature (English, French, Portuguese, Libras and Spanish)
- Law
- Licenciature Indigenous
- Mathematics
- Medicine
- Music
- Nutrition
- Nursing
- Pedagogy
- Philosophy
- Physical Education
- Economic Sciences
- Physics
- Psychology
- Social Sciences: Sociology, Anthropology and Political Science
- Theater
- Veterinary Medicine

== Master programs ==
- Master in computer science
- Master in ecology and natural resource management
- Master in environmental sciences
- Master in forestry science
- Master in health and sustainable animal production in the western Amazon
- Master in health sciences in the western amazon
- Master in humanities and languages teaching
- Master in performing arts
- Master in plant production
- Master in Public Health
- Master in regional development
- Master in science, innovation and technology for the amazon
- Master of Arts in language, language and identity
- Master's in education
- Professional master’s degree in history teaching
- Professional master’s degree in letters
- Professional master’s degree in mathematics
- Professional master’s degree in physics teaching
- Professional master’s degree in science and mathematics teaching

== Doctoral programs ==
- Plant Production
- Biodiversity and Biotechnology
- Health and Sustainable Animal Production in the Western Amazon
- Collective Health

== Admissions ==
The Federal University of Acre, as well as the other Brazilian federal universities, adopted the National High School Examination (ENEM) in 2012 as a standard of admission.

== Notable alumni ==
- Binho Marques, former Governor of Acre.
- Marina Silva, former senator of the state of Acre.
- Mailza Gomes, senator of the state of Acre.
- Iolanda Fleming, former Governor of Acre and the first woman to become a state governor in Brazil.

== See also ==
- List of federal universities of Brazil
