= Binho Marques =

Brazilian politician (born 1962)

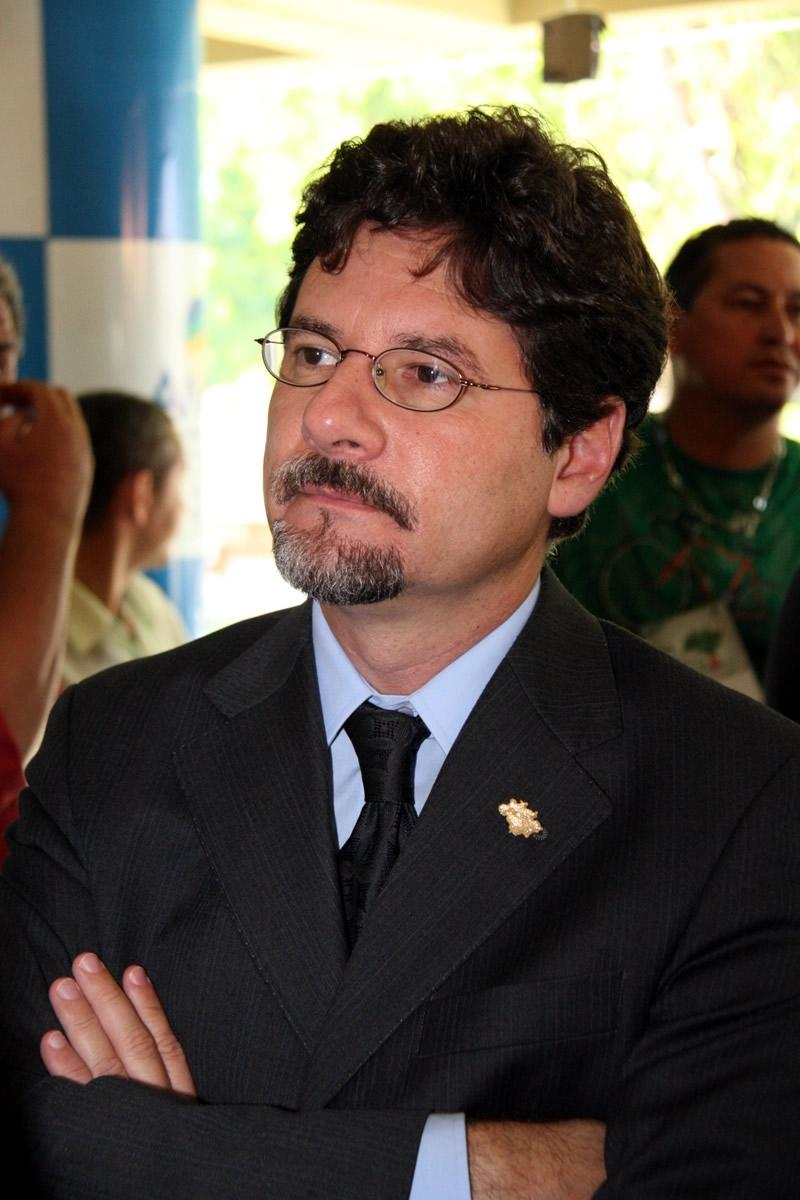

Governor of Acre
- In office March 31, 2006 – January 1, 2011
- Preceded by: Jorge Viana
- Succeeded by: Tião Viana

Personal details
- Born: October 29, 1962 (age 63) São Paulo, Brazil
- Party: Workers' Party

Binho Marques (born October 29, 1962, in São Paulo) is a Brazilian politician, and was the Governor of Acre from 2006 to 2010, when the government was assumed by Tião Viana. He is a member of the Workers' Party.
