= Legislative Assembly of Acre =

Brazilian state legislature

Legislative Assembly of the State of Acre Assembleia Legislativa do Estado do Acre
- 16th Legislature of the Legislative Assembly

Type
- Term limits: None

History
- New session started: 1 February 2025

Leadership
- President: Nicolau Júnior, PP since 9 July 2024
- Government Leader: Pedro Longo, MDB
- 1st Secretary: Luiz Gonzaga Alves, PSDB

Structure
- Political groups: PCdoB (1) PDT (1) MDB (4) UNIÃO (8) PP (5) REPUBLICANOS (3) NOVO (1) PL (1)
- Length of term: 4 years

Elections
- Voting system: Open list proportional representation
- Last election: 2 October 2022
- Next election: 4 October 2026

Meeting place
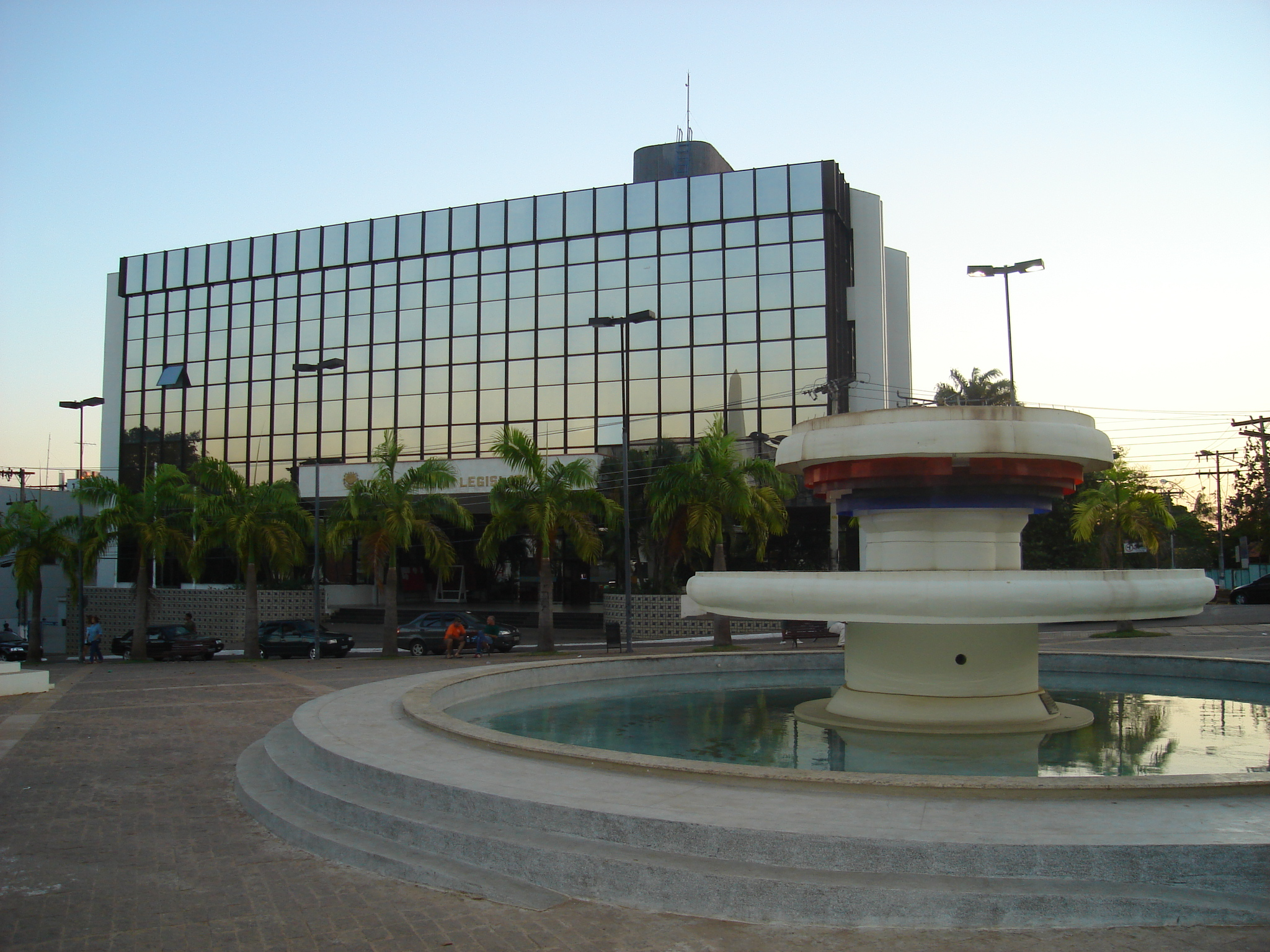
- Rio Branco, Acre, Brazil

Website
- www.al.ac.leg.br

The Legislative Assembly State of Acre (Portuguese: Assembleia Legislativa do Estado do Acre) is the legislative body in the government of the state of Acre in Brazil.

It is composed of 24 state deputies and located in Rio Branco, Acre.
