= Tião Viana =

Brazilian politician and doctor

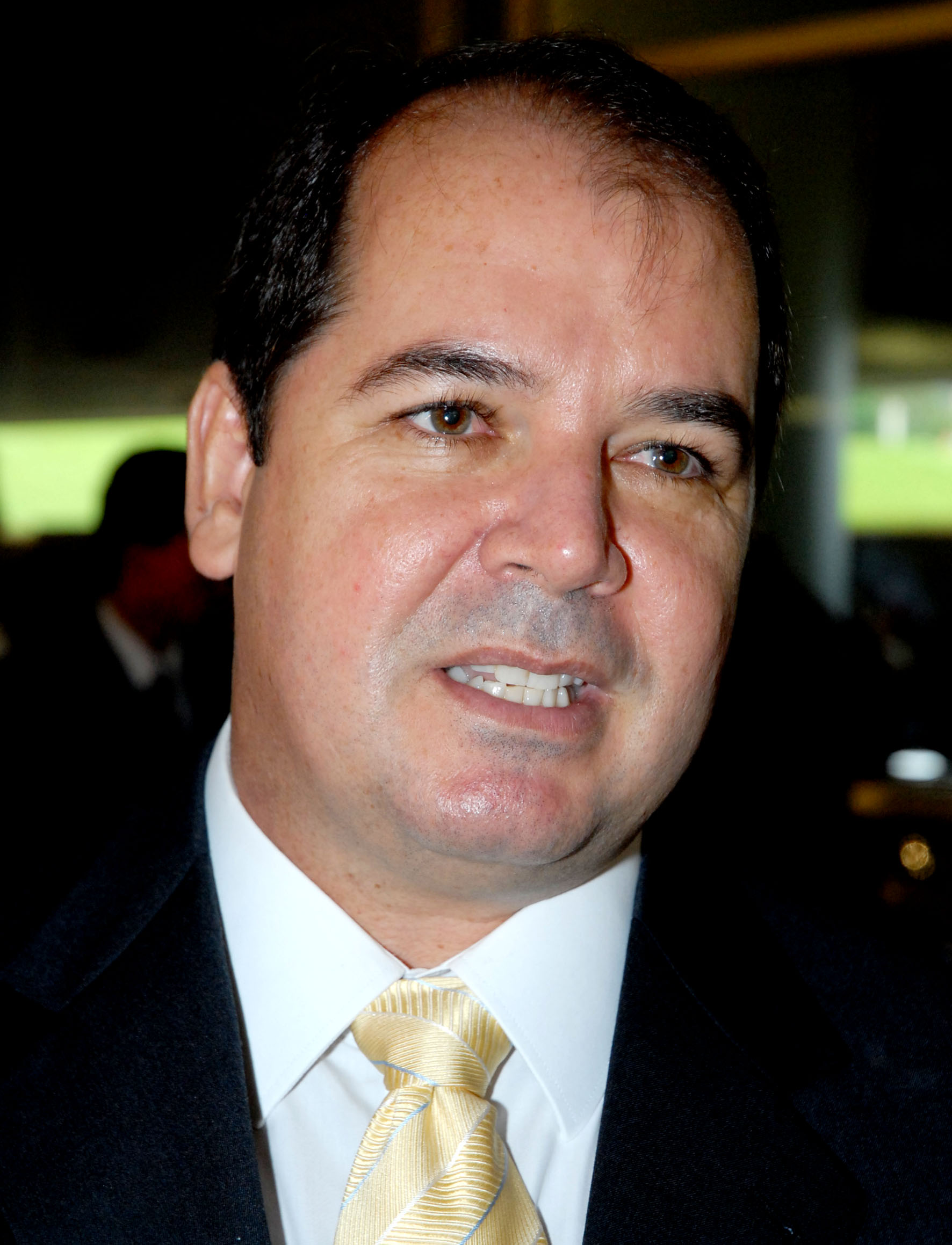

17th Governor of Acre
- In office 1 February 2011 – January 1, 2019
- Preceded by: Binho Marques
- Succeeded by: Gladson Cameli

Senator for Acre
- In office 1 February 1999 – 21 December 2010
- Preceded by: Flaviano Melo
- Succeeded by: Aníbal Diniz

President of the Federal Senate Acting
- In office 15 October 2007 – 11 December 2007
- Preceded by: Renan Calheiros
- Succeeded by: Garibaldi Alves Filho

Personal details
- Born: Rio Branco, AC, Brazil
- Party: PT (1994–present)
- Spouse: Marlucia Cândido
- Relatives: Jorge Viana (brother); Widly Viana (father)
- Education: University of Brasília (UnB); Federal University of Triângulo Mineiro (UFTM)
- Occupation: Physician, Politician

Sebastião Afonso Viana Macedo Neves, better known as Tião Viana, is a Brazilian medical doctor, professor, and politician. He was formerly Governor of Acre and is a member of the Workers' Party. He served as interim President of the Senate in 2007. He is a professor at the Federal University of Acre.

Political offices
Preceded by Binho Marques	Governor of Acre; 2011–present	Incumbent
Preceded by Renan Calheiros	President of the Federal Senate (acting); 2007	Succeeded by Garibaldi Alves Filho
