= Huni Kuin =

Indigenous people of Brazil

Huni Kuin Kaxinawá
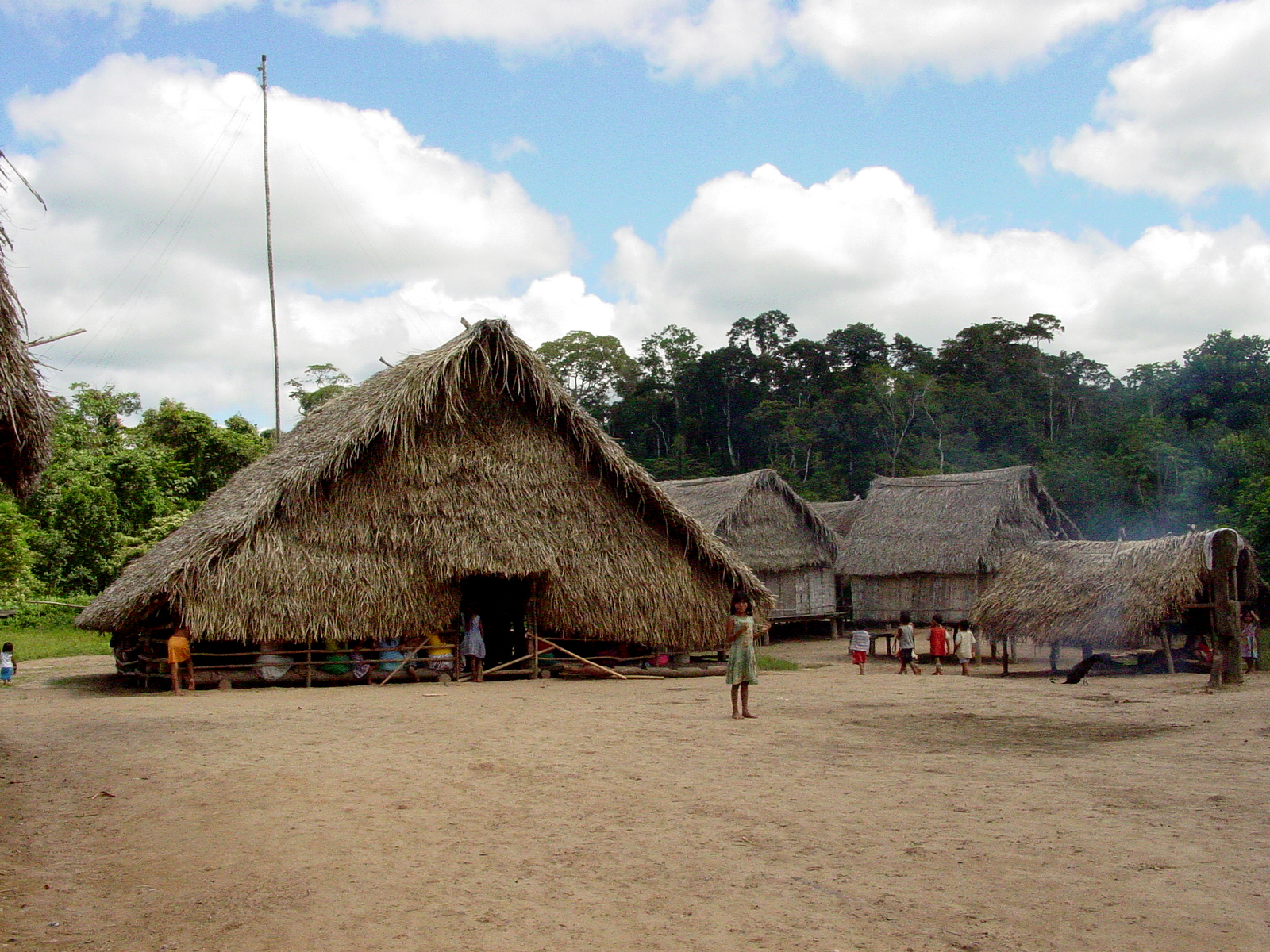
- Huni Kuin village in Acre

Total population
- ~13,000

Regions with significant populations
- Brazil (Acre)
- Brazil: 10,818 (2014)
- Peru: 2,419 (2007)

Languages
- Kashinawa

Religion
- Traditional tribal religion

The Huni Kuin (also known as: Kaxinawá, Cashinahua, Kaschinawa, Kashinawa, Caxinauás) are an Indigenous people of Brazil and Peru. Their villages are located along the Purus and Curanja Rivers in Peru and the Tarauacá, Jordão, Breu, Muru, Envira, Humaitã, and Purus Rivers in Brazil.

In the Peruvian Amazon rainforest, some Huni Kuin live on the Alto Purús Indigenous Territory with the Kulina people.

== Name ==
The name Huni Kuin means "true people" or "people with traditions". The alternative name Kaxinawá means "cannibals", "bat people" and "people who walk about at night". It is still widespread in literature, yet the Huni Kuin reject the name as an insult.

== Language ==
The Huni Kuin speak the Kaxinawá language, a Panoan language. They call their language Hancha Kuin, meaning "real words." Only 5% to 10% of the Huni Kuin in Peru speak Spanish and literacy rates are low.

== Economy ==
Hunting is of paramount importance in Huni Kuin society. Huni Kuin also fish, gather plant foods, and grow crops through swidden, or slash-and-burn horticulture. Rice has become an export crop.

Women weave baskets, string bead jewelry, create utilitarian ceramics and weave hammocks and clothing. Men weave certain baskets, carve tools from wood, create featherwork and ceremonial regalia, and make canoes and weapons, such as clubs, spears, and bows and arrows. In hunting, shotguns are popular.

== Founding myth ==
The Caxinauá founding myth also explains the origin of the use of uni or ayahuasca vine - with which an entheogenic drink used ritualistically is produced. According to the myth, a man named Yube was fascinated to see a woman copulate with a tapir and then leave for the bottom of the river as an anaconda, after the tapir had attracted her by throwing a genipap. He throws a genipap on the riverbank for the same purpose, and clings to the head of the woman emerging from the waters. They copulate, and she agrees to marry him: the man lied that he had no wife. Both went to the bottom of the sea: she went back to being an anaconda, and he also turned into an anaconda. He is warned by the anaconda-wife not to take the vine, as she and the other anacondas did, because, as long as it was in its effect, he would see that they were all in fact anacondas, he would no longer have the illusion that they were all human, and he would be afraid; He only disobeyed once, but was reassured by his anaconda-wife through a song.

A while after disobeying, after having had children with this woman, a fish that was being hunted by his anaconda-wife invites him to jump out of the river, becoming a man again. He accepts the invitation. However, outside the river, the anaconda woman comes to pick him up with her children to come back to the river. He refuses to return. Then his father-in-law tries to swallow him, to bring him back by force; He manages, however, to cling to the branches of a tree and scream for help to his human family, who hears his call, arrives at the scene and opens his anaconda-father-in-law with a knife. Being safe, he is very weakened and crushed from having been partially swallowed: he then asks his relatives to prepare ayahuasca from the vine and the leaf, so that he can be cured. After a while, Yube died, and since then, the Caxinauá have continued to drink the ayahuasca he taught them how to prepare. From his grave, birds were born, as well as a vine tree.
