= Chico Mendes Extractive Reserve =

Protected area in Acre, Brazil

- Reserva Extrativista Chico Mendes
- IUCN category VI (protected area with sustainable use of natural resources)
- Location within Brazil
- Nearest city: Rio Branco, Acre
- Coordinates: 10.467274°S 69.156078°W
- Area: 931,537.14 hectares (2,301,878.4 acres)
- Designation: Extractive reserve
- Created: 12 March 1990
- Administrator: Chico Mendes Institute for Biodiversity Conservation

Chico Mendes Extractive Reserve (Portuguese: Reserva Extrativista Chico Mendes) is an extractive reserve in the state of Acre, Brazil.

== Location ==
Conservation units in eastern Acre. 5: Chico Mendes Extractive Reserve

The Chico Mendes Extractive Reserve has an area of 931,537.14 hectares (2,301,878.4 acres). It is in the Amazon biome. The reserve covers parts of the municipalities of Assis Brasil, Brasiléia, Capixaba, Epitaciolândia, Rio Branco, Sena Madureira and Xapuri in the state of Acre. The Chico Mendes Extratice Reserve is the largest reserve within the Amazon.

The reserve lies in the Acre River Depression and the Lower Amazon Plateau. Altitudes range from 200 to 300 metres (660 to 980 ft) above sea level. The portion in the Acre River Depression is in the interfluvial between the Acre River and the Branco River, on the right bank of the Iaco River. The highest points are less than 259 metres (850 ft) in altitude. The Lower Amazon Plateau portion in the centre of the reserve is crossed by the Xapuri River, and has heights up to 300 metres (980 ft). The BR-317 highway is to the east and south of the reserve, running from Rio Branco to Assis Brasil. The Acre River forms part of south east boundary of the reserve. The Iaco River forms the north west boundary and the border with Peru forms part of the south west boundary.

Average annual rainfall is 2,054 millimetres (80.9 in). Temperatures range from 12 to 39 °C (54 to 102 °F) with an average of 28 °C (82 °F). The reserve is considered and centre of endemism for birds and amphibians and a haven for butterflies and birds. The traditional population hunt the collared peccary, white-lipped peccary, pampas deer, robust capuchin monkey and tapir, their main sources of protein.

== Conservation ==
The Chico Mendes Extractive Reserve was created by decree 99.144 of 12 March 1990, and is administered by the Chico Mendes Institute for Biodiversity Conservation. The reserve is named after the assassinated rubber tapper and environmentalist Chico Mendes, and was meant to be maintained by families of traditional rubber tapper families who would harvest latex and nuts. It is classed as IUCN protected area category VI (protected area with sustainable use of natural resources). An extractive reserve is an area used by traditional extractive populations whose livelihood is based on extraction, subsistence agriculture and small-scale animal raising. Its basic objectives are to protect the livelihoods and culture of these people and to ensure sustainable use of natural resources. The reserve is supported by the Amazon Region Protected Areas Program. The reserve would be included in the proposed Western Amazon Ecological Corridor.

== People and issues ==
Approximately 10,000 people live within the Chico Mendes Extractive Reserve , spread throughout 46 tree tracts. Many of the people living within the reserve participate in a community-based monitoring program that was implemented in 2013. This program was created by the Centre for Amazonian Workers (CTA), a local NGO in the reserve, and is coordinated by the Global Canopy Programme (GCP). This program was established with intent to help balance the monitoring needs of federal and state institutions with the needs of the reserve residents. 40 community monitors living within the reserve were to be selected and trained to gather data and interview others living within the reserve. GCP would then feed back overall monitoring results to the monitors, who would in turn, share the information with their fellow residents.

There have been several hurdles in regards to gathering the data. The lack of social cohesion in the community and disputes over resources handicapped collection of data. The time taken to travel to meetings over large distances also discouraged consistent participation by monitors. However, the program has provided useful information on how the local population is involved in Acre's Reducing emissions from deforestation and forest degradation (REDD) program, and how it is affecting them, helping strengthen the management of the reserve.

Tappers in the reserve collect latex that is sold to the Natex condom factory in the municipality of Xapuri, earning about R$800 per month. Almost all the residents today also raise cattle, which can be sold as needed and provide more income for less effort. Land is sometimes sold to people who are unaware that it is a reservation. Under the utilisation plan each resident can use up to 15 hectares (37 acres) for pasture, but may be fined if they exceed this amount. The 2009 census showed that some families had indeed gone over this limit. A community leader said in 2013 that the son of a tapper born today wants to raise cattle.

== Sources ==
- Ayres, José Márcio; Da Fonseca, Gustavo A. B.; Rylands, Anthony B.; Queiroz, Helder L.; Pinto, Luiz Paulo; Masterson, Donald; Cavalcanti, Roberto B. (2005), Os Corredores Ecológicos das Florestas Tropicais do Brasil (PDF) (in Portuguese), Sociedade Civil Mamirauá, archived from the original (PDF) on 2016-07-31
- Community monitoring in the Chico Mendes Extractive Reserve in Acre, Brazil, Global Canopy Programme, 2015
- Full list: PAs supported by ARPA, ARPA
- Resex Chico Mendes (in Portuguese), Chico Mendes Institute for Biodiversity Conservation
- Resex Chico Mendes – Mapa Interativo (in Portuguese), Chico Mendes Institute for Biodiversity Conservation
- Unidade de Conservação: Reserva Extrativista Chico Mendes (in Portuguese), MMA: Ministério do Meio Ambiente
- Yuri Marcel (22 December 2013), "'Filho de seringueiro hoje já nasce querendo criar gado', diz extrativista", G1 Globo
