= Chandless =

Chandless may refer to:

== People with the surname ==
- John Chandless (1884–1968), Welsh cricketer
- William Chandless, British explorer

== Other uses ==
- Chandless River, in Western Brazil
