= Macauã River =

- Location within Brazil
- Native name: Rio Macauã (Portuguese)

Location
- Country: Brazil

Physical characteristics
- Source
  - location: Acre state
- Mouth
  - location: Iaco River, Sena Madureira, Acre
  - coordinates: 9.187644°S 68.717920°W

Basin features
- River system: Iaco River

Macauã River is a river of Acre state in western Brazil, a tributary of the Iaco River.

The river forms most of the southeast boundary of the 176,349 hectares (435,770 acres) Macauã National Forest, a sustainable use conservation unit created in 1988. It flows through the northern part of the 21,148 hectares (52,260 acres) São Francisco National Forest, a sustainable use conservation unit created in 2001. It then flows through the eastern part of the 750,795 hectares (1,855,250 acres) Cazumbá-Iracema Extractive Reserve, established in 2002 to support sustainable use of the natural resources by the traditional population.

== See also ==
- List of rivers of Acre
