= Grajaú River =

Grajaú River may refer to the following rivers in Brazil:

- Grajaú River (Acre)
- Grajaú River (Maranhão)
