= Andirá River (Acre River tributary) =

Location
- Country: Brazil

Physical characteristics
- Source
  - location: Acre state
- Mouth: Acre River
  - coordinates: 9°21′S 67°31′W

Andirá River is a river of Acre and Amazonas states in western Brazil. It is a tributary of the Acre River.

== See also ==
- List of rivers of Acre
- List of rivers of Amazonas (Brazilian state)
