= List of rivers of Acre =

List of rivers in Acre (Brazilian State).

The list is arranged by drainage basin, with respective tributaries indented under each larger stream's name and ordered from downstream to upstream. Acre is located entirely within the Amazon Basin.

== By Drainage Basin ==
- Amazon River (Pará, Amazonas)
  - Madeira River (Amazonas, Rondônia)
    - Abunã River
      - Xipamanu River
        - Iná River
  - Purus River
    - Ituxi River (Iquiri River)
    - Acre River
      - Antimary River
      - Andirá River
      - Branco River
        - Espalha River
      - Xapuri River
    - Iaco River
      - Caeté River
      - Macauã River
      - Igarapé Riozinho
    - Chandless River
      - Igarapé Cochichá
      - Igarapé Sindrichal
    - Santa Rosa River
    - Chambuiaco River
  - Juruá River
    - Tarauacá River
      - Envira River
        - Jurupari River
        - Igarapé Paraná
        - Rio Jaminauá
      - Acurauá River
      - Muru River
      - Jordão River
    - Gregório River
    - Liberdade River
    - Moa River
      - Azul River
    - Do Moura River (Paraná da Viúva River)
    - Valparaiso River
    - Juruá-Mirim River
    - Igarapé Humaitá
    - Igarapé Natal
    - Ouro River
    - Das Minas River
    - Grajaú River
    - Paratari River
    - Amônia River
    - Arara River
    - Tejo River
      - Bagé River
    - Acuriá River
    - Igarapé Caipora
    - Igarapé São João
    - Breu River

== Alphabetically ==
- Abunã River
- Acre River
- Acurauá River
- Acuriá River
- Amônia River
- Andirá River
- Arara River
- Antimary River
- Azul River
- Bagé River
- Branco River
- Breu River
- Caeté River
- Igarapé Caipora
- Chambuiaco River
- Chandless River
- Igarapé Cochichá
- Envira River
- Espalha River
- Grajaú River
- Gregório River
- Igarapé Humaitá
- Iaco River
- Iná River
- Ituxi River (Iquiri River)
- Jaminauá River
- Jordão River
- Juruá River
- Juruá-Mirim River
- Jurupari River
- Liberdade River
- Macauã River
- Das Minas River
- Moa River
- Do Moura River (Paraná da Viúva River)
- Muru River
- Igarapé Natal
- Ouro River
- Igarapé Paraná
- Paratari River
- Purus River
- Igarapé Riozinho
- Santa Rosa River
- Igarapé São João
- Igarapé Sindrichal
- Tarauacá River
- Tejo River
- Valparaiso River
- Xapuri River
- Xipamanu River
