= Antimary River =

Antimary River Rio Antimari
- Location within Brazil
- Native name: Rio Antimary (Portuguese)

Location
- Country: Brazil

Physical characteristics
- Mouth
  - location: Acre River, Boca do Acre, Amazonas
  - coordinates: 9.069929°S 67.401359°W

Basin features
- River system: Acre River

The Antimary River (Portuguese: Rio Antimary), also called the Antimari River, is a river that flows through the states of Acre and Amazonas in Brazil. It is a tributary of the Acre River.

== Course ==
The Antimary River rises in central Acre and flows in a northeast direction to join the Acre River in Amazonas. The river flows through the Antimary State Forest in Acre, a 47,064 hectares (116,300 acres) sustainable use conservation unit created in 1997. In the rainy season it is the only transport route for families living in the state forest, used for carrying Brazil nuts, rubber and cassava flour.

The Antimary River is first mentioned in a 1907 letter by José Plácido de Castro on navigation of the Acre River. He described the main geographical points of the Antimary, a tributary of the Acre. He noted that there were several shacks on the river banks, indicating the presence of rubber tappers. In 2006 some fishermen caught a 120 kilograms (260 lb) pirarucu 2.2 metres (7 ft 3 in) long. The fish is now extremely rare in Acre. In 2012 the government said it has authorised a company to clear obstacles from 20 kilometres (12 mi) of the river.

== See also ==
- List of rivers of Acre

== Sources ==
- Evandro Ferreira (19 September 2006), Pirarucu no Rio Antimary (in Portuguese)
- FES do Antimary (in Portuguese), ISA:Instituto Socioambiental
- Resumo Público de Certificação de FLORESTA ESTADUAL DO ANTIMARY (PDF) (in Portuguese), SmartWood Program, 21 October 2005, archived from the original (PDF) on 3 December 2008
- Terezinha Moreira (28 August 2012), "Governo inicia limpeza do Rio Antimary", Notícias do Acre (in Portuguese)
