= Rio Envira =

- Location within Brazil

Location
- Country: Brazil

Physical characteristics
- Mouth
  - location: Tarauacá River, Envira, Amazonas
  - coordinates: 7.496669°S 70.066312°W

Basin features
- River system: Tarauacá River

Rio Envira is a river in Acre state in Brazil. The Rio Jaminauá is one of its tributaries. It is a tributary of the Tarauacá River.

The river defines the northwest boundary of the 231,555 hectares (572,180 acres) Santa Rosa do Purus National Forest, a sustainable use conservation unit created in 2001. It flows in a north of northeast direction from the park, passing under the BR-364 highway and flowing north into Amazonas state, where it joins the Tarauacá just south of the settlement of Envira.

== See also ==
- List of rivers of Acre
