= Xapuri =

Municipality in Acre, Brazil

- Municipality
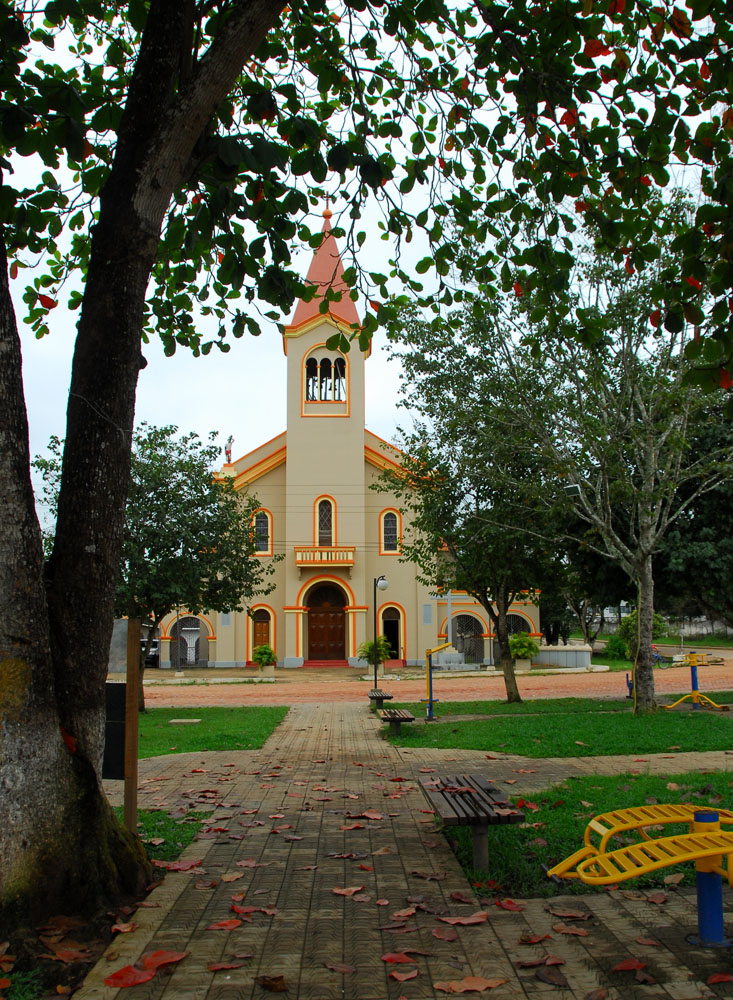
- Church of Saint Sebastian.

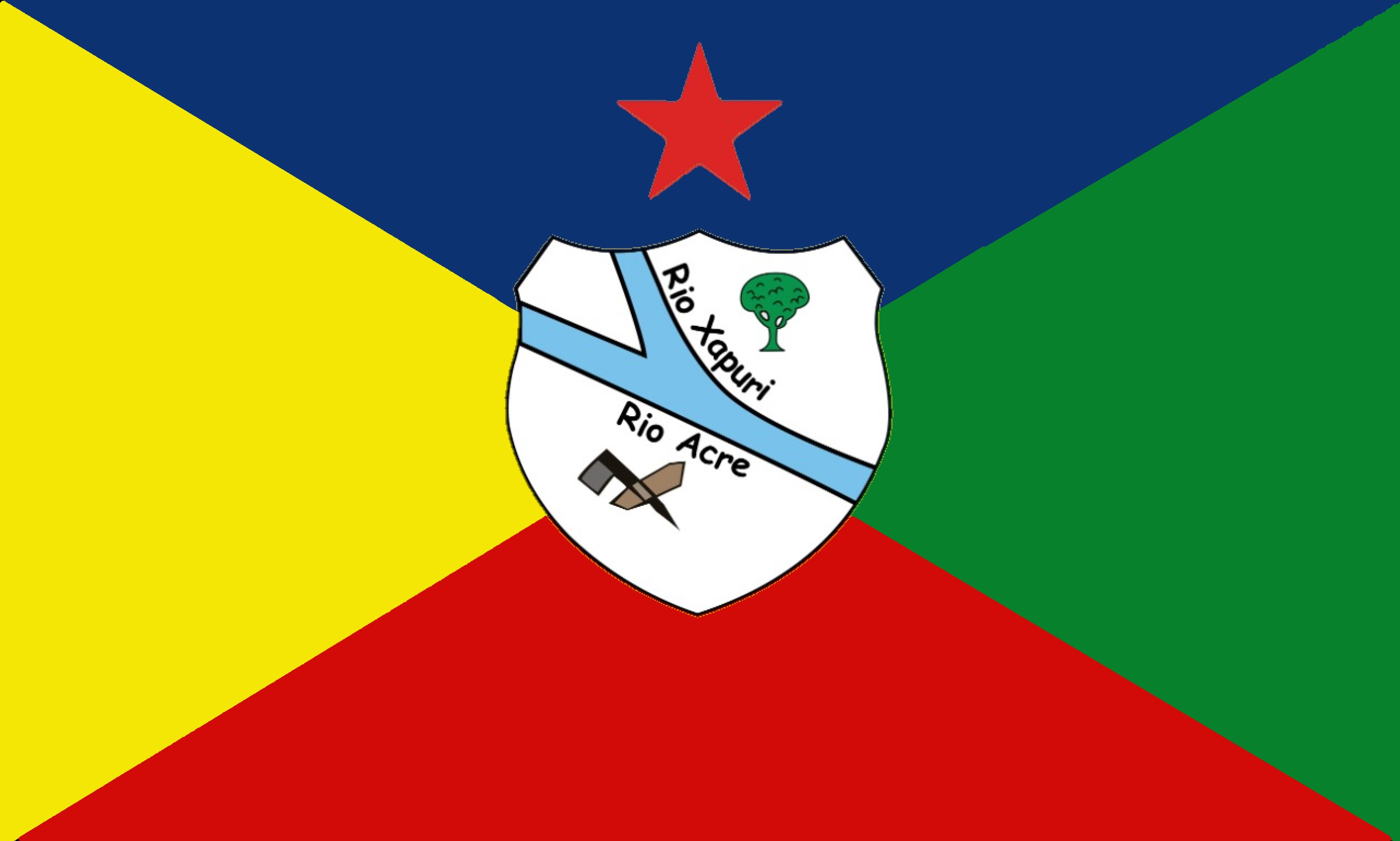
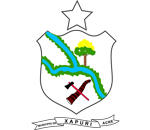
- Flag Coat of arms

- Location of municipality in Acre State

- Location in Brazil
- Coordinates: 10°39′07″S 68°30′14″W
- Country: Brazil
- Region: North
- State: Acre
- Founded: 1883

Government
  - Mayor: Maxsuel Maia Pereira (PP - 2025-2028)

Area
  - Total: 5,251 km^{2} (2,027 sq mi)

Population (2022)
  - Total: 18,243
  - Density: 3.01/km^{2} (7.8/sq mi)
- Time zone: UTC−5 (ACT)

Xapuri (Portuguese pronunciation: [ʃapuˈɾi]) is a municipality located in the southeast of the Brazilian state of Acre. It was the scene of an early bloodless victory during the war to make Acre independent of Bolivia. The town is known as the birthplace of the rubber tapper and environmentalist Chico Mendes and of the surgeon and professor Adib Jatene.

== Geography ==
Xapuri is at the point where the Xapuri River meets the Acre River. Its name is said to come from the Indigenous word Chapury, meaning "river meeting". Another explanation is that its name comes from the indigenous tribe of "Xapury" people. The town is about 12 kilometres (7.5 mi) northwest of the BR-317 highway which leads from Rio Branco, 241 kilometres (150 mi) to the east, to Brasiléia, 74 kilometres (46 mi) to the west. It has broad streets and wooden houses. The area of the municipality is 5,347.468 square kilometres (2,064.669 sq mi). It is 12th largest in area in Acre. It is bounded by the municipality of Sena Madureira to the west, Rio Branco to the north, Capixaba to the east, Epitaciolândia to the south, and Brasiléia to the southwest.

The municipality contains part of the 931,537-hectare (2,301,880-acre) Chico Mendes Extractive Reserve, a sustainable use environmental unit created in 1990. The reserve is fairly well maintained apart from a few locations of deforestation, but its surroundings are quite deforested, compromising its buffer zone.

== History ==
Xapuri was born in 1883 shortly after Volta da Empreza (today's Rio Branco) was founded. The first Europeans came to the region in the first rubber boom, a period of uncontrolled land grabbing and extraction of forest resources. The village of Xapuri became one of Acre's main rubber trading posts, and the region was an important producer of rubber and Brazil nuts. Until the Acre War of 1902–03 it was part of Bolivia, although most of the new colonists were Brazilian. At the time of the Acre War the Bolivians called the post Mariscal Sucre.

At the start of 1902 José Plácido de Castro accepted an invitation to lead a revolt against Bolivia. Although he argued for immediately attacking the garrison of 230 troops at Puerto Alonso (now Porto Acre), Plácido de Castro was persuaded to first take the outpost at Xapuri. He entered Xapuri with 33 men in the early morning of 6 August 1902 and captured the sleeping garrison without spilling blood. On 7 August 1902 he issued a manifesto proclaiming that Acre was independent. After further fighting the last Bolivian forces surrender at what is now Porto Acre on 24 January 1903.

The village of Xapuri was officially elevated to the status of a town on 22 March 1904 by the prefect of Alto Acre, Colonel Augusto da Cunha Matos. On 22 March 1905 it was elevated to the status of city by the interim prefect Captain Odilon Pratagi Brasiliense. Xapuri was officially made a municipality on 23 October 1912. Infrastructure was soon built, including trading houses and schools. For many years Xapuri was known as the Little Princess of Acre (Princesinha do Acre) due to its great wealth from rubber.

The city became famous after the 1988 assassination of the rubber tapper and environmentalist Chico Mendes, who was born in Xapuri. His house has been preserved as one of the attractions of the town.

== People and economy ==
The municipality of Xapuri has the 9th largest population in Acre. As of 2010 the population was 16,091. The estimated population in 2020 was 19,596. The population density of 2010 was 3.01 people per square kilometre.

The town is an important Acre tourist destination for its monuments to the Acre War and the house of Chico Mendes, and has an eco-lodge at the Seringal Waterfall. Apart from cattle ranching and subsistence farming, there is a condom factory, wood flooring factory and furniture workshops. There are several settlement projects for extraction of nuts and rubber, subsistence agriculture and forestry. The people also raise livestock, hunt and fish. The Xapuri I and II projects are trying to bring back extractors and farmers who had moved to the city and to promote recovery of areas of pasturage and slash-and-burn agriculture by replanting fruit trees and timber trees.

== Gallery ==
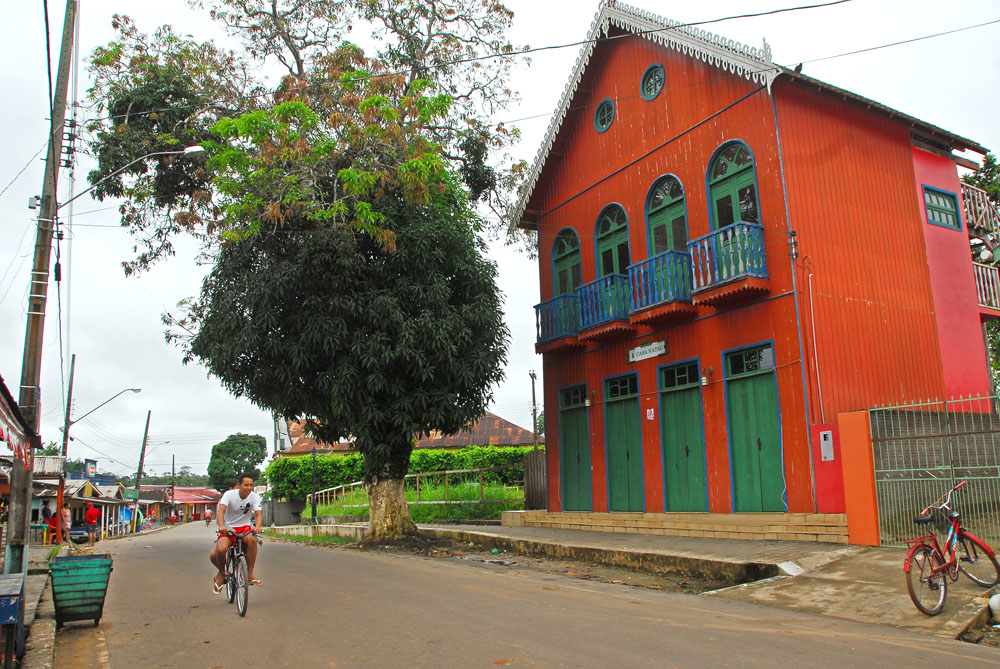
Rural Gothic architecture is common in Acre state, Brazil. Photo: Downtown Xapuri, Acre

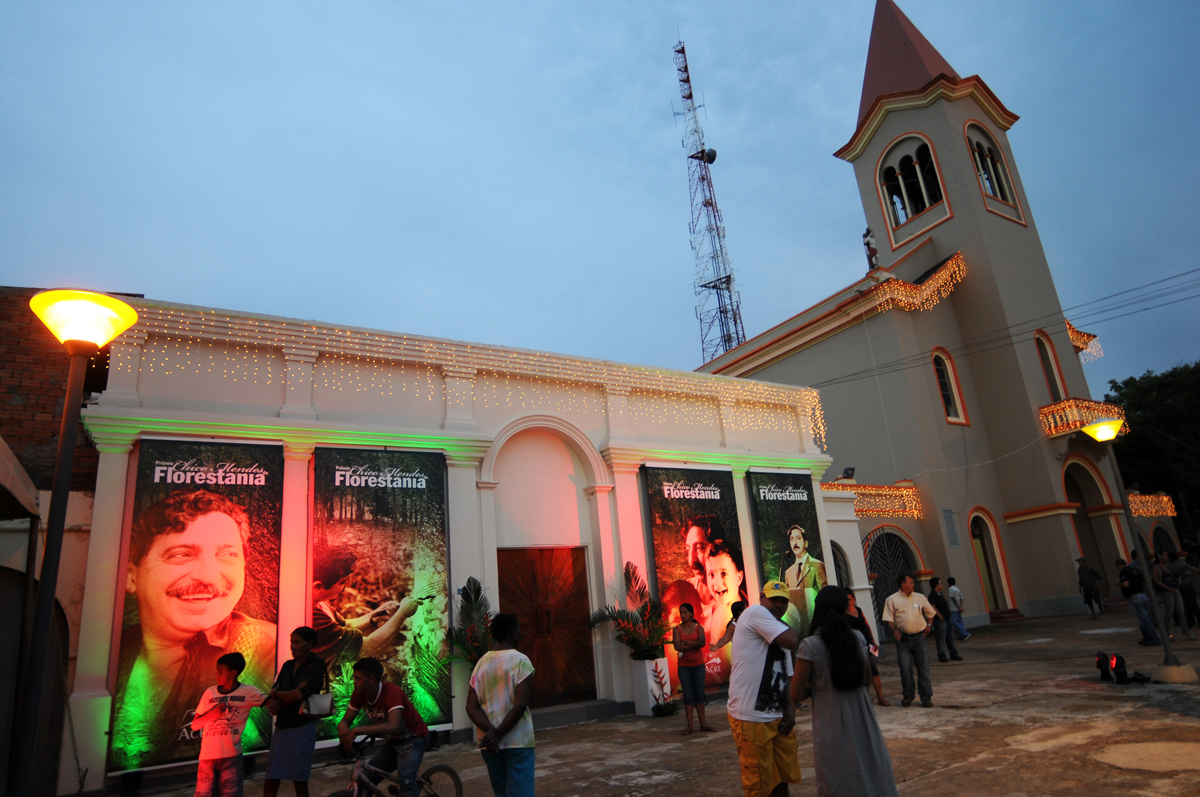
St. Sebastian Church, Xapuri, Brazil

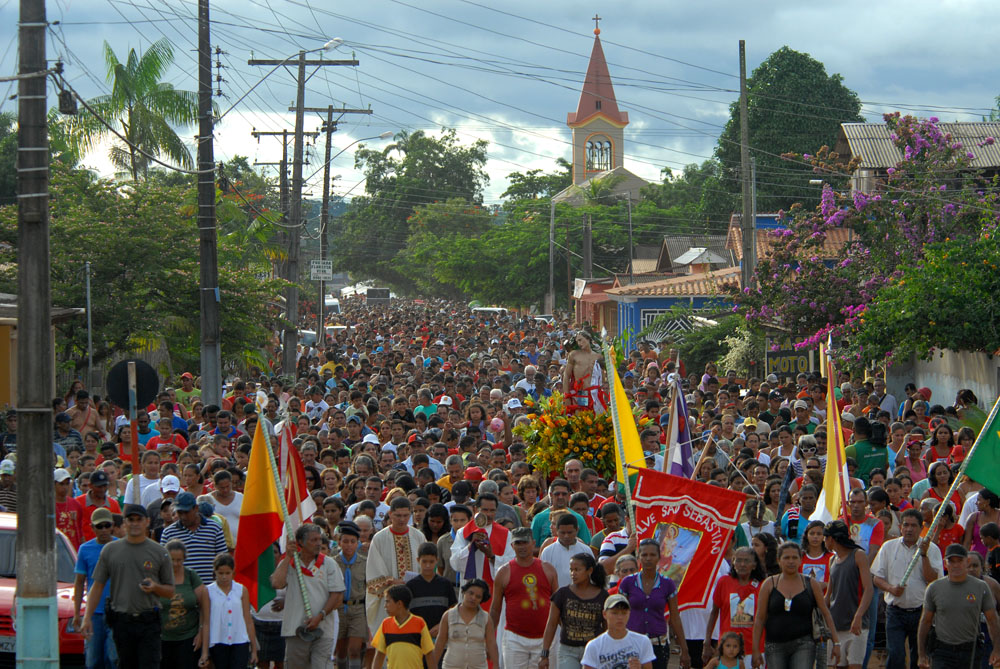
Saint Sebastian Festivities, Xapuri, Brazil

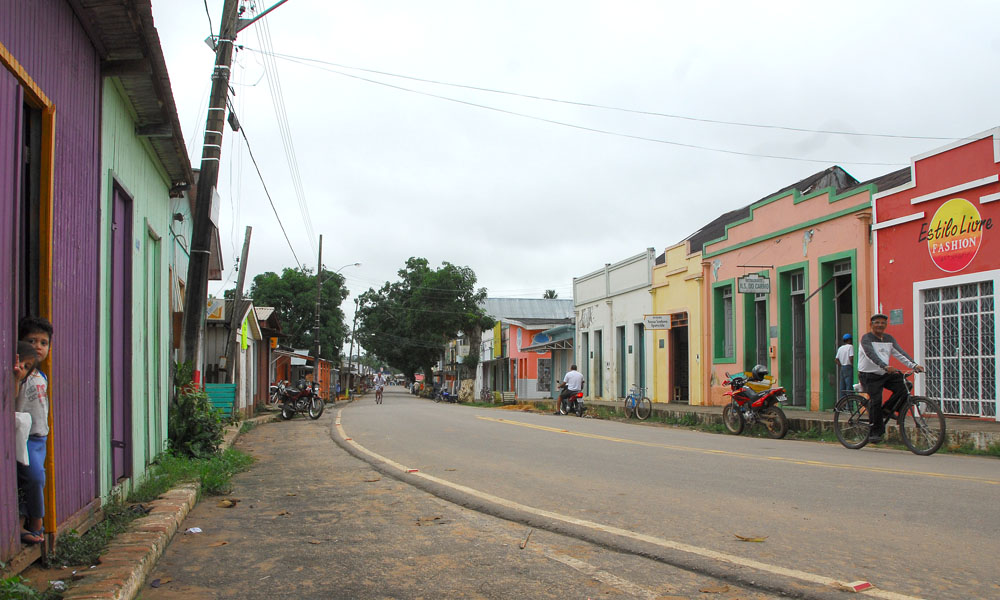
Xapuri, Acre

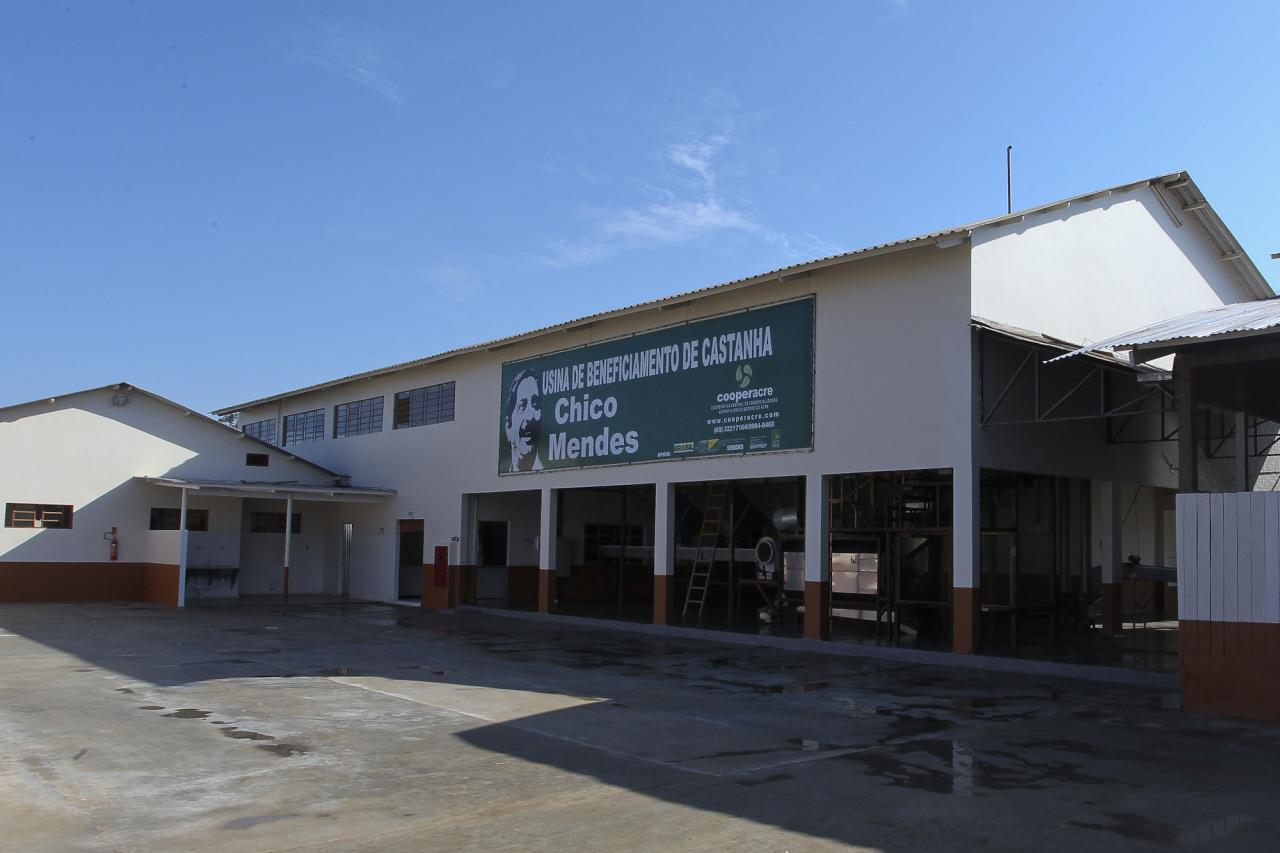
Brazil nut Finishing Power Plant, Xapuri, Brazil

== Sources ==
- Acre » Xapuri (in Portuguese), IBGE - Instituto Brasileiro de Geografia e Estatística
- "História de Xapuri", Prefeitura Municipal de Xapuri (in Portuguese), Prefeitura de Xapuri, archived from the original on 2016-08-14
- Pedraja, René De La (2006-04-11), Wars of Latin America, 1899-1941, McFarland, ISBN 978-0-7864-8257-3
- Senador Jorge Viana, Plácido de Castro (in Portuguese)
- Unidade de Conservação: Reserva Extrativista Chico Mendes (in Portuguese), MMA: Ministério do Meio Ambiente
- "Welcome to Xapuri", Lonely Planet
- Xapuri (in Portuguese), Governo do Estado do Acre, archived from the original on 2016-08-14
