= Santa Rosa do Purus National Forest =

National forest in Brazil

- Floresta Nacional de Santa Rosa do Purus
- IUCN category VI (protected area with sustainable use of natural resources)
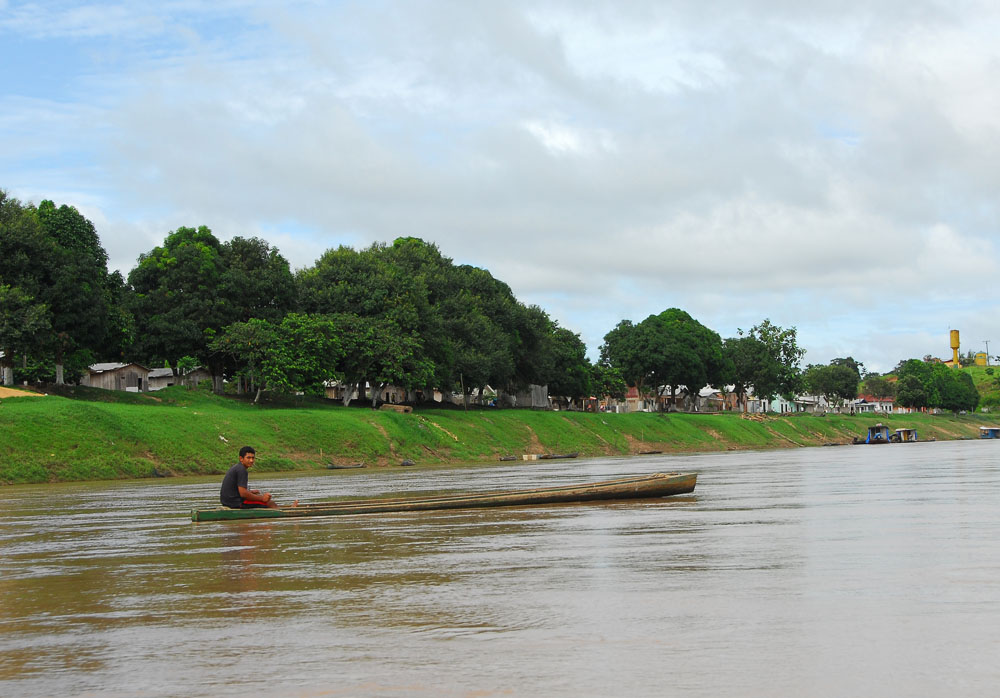

- Location within Brazil
- Nearest city: Feijó, Acre
- Coordinates: 9°31′18″S 71°07′11″W
- Area: 231,555.52 hectares (572,186.2 acres)
- Designation: National forest
- Created: 7 August 2001
- Administrator: Chico Mendes Institute for Biodiversity Conservation

The Santa Rosa do Purus National Forest (Portuguese: Floresta Nacional de Santa Rosa do Purus) is a national forest in the state of Acre, Brazil.

== Location ==
Conservation units in the west of Acre.: 6. Santa Rosa do Purus National Forest

The Santa Rosa do Purus National Forest is in the municipality of Feijó in the state of Acre. It has an area of 231,555.52 hectares (572,186.2 acres). The Alto Rio Purus Indigenous Territory adjoins the extreme east of the park. Other indigenous territories adjoining or overlapping the park are the Kaxinawa Nova Olinda, Kulina do Igarapé do Pau, Kulina do Rio Envira, Riozinho do Alto Envira and Jaminawa/Envira indigenous territories. The last is mostly contained within the park.

The northwest boundary is defined by the Rio Envira. The Santa Rosa River, which defines the border between Brazil and Peru in this region, flows in a north east direction some distance to the south of the park and then forms the boundary for a short distance until it joins the Purus River, which then forms part of the boundary before flowing north east towards Manoel Urbano.

The park is in the Amazon biome. Vegetation is typical of tropical riverine forest, with the presence of orchids and bromeliads.

== History ==
The Santa Rosa do Purus National Forest was created by presidential decree on 7 August 2001. It is administered by the Chico Mendes Institute for Biodiversity Conservation (ICMBio). It is classed as IUCN protected area category VI (protected area with sustainable use of natural resources). The purpose is to support sustainable use of forest resources and scientific research, with emphasis on methods of sustainable exploitation of native forests. On 23 August 2006 the Instituto Nacional de Colonização e Reforma Agrária (National Institute for Colonization and Agrarian Reform, INCRA) recognised the forest as an agro-extraction project for 35 families. INCRA later ceded the forest to ICMBio.

A decree of 5 June 2012 demarcated land that was to be in the permanent possession of the isolated Asháninka people. The national forest covers about 7,250 hectares (17,900 acres) of the Riozinho do Alto Envira Indigenous Territory. This area would be subject to double-allocation. Use of forest resources, scientific research and public visits would only be allowed by agreement between Fundação Nacional do Índio (National Indian Foundation) and ICMBio.

== Sources ==
- Flona de Santa Rosa do Purus (in Portuguese), Chico Mendes Institute for Biodiversity Conservation
- FLONA de Santa Rosa do Purus (in Portuguese), ISA: Instituto Socioambiental
- Unidade de Conservação: Floresta Nacional de Santa Rosa do Purus (in Portuguese), MMA: Ministério do Meio Ambiente
