= Aquiry civilization =

Ancient Amazonian civilization

The Aquiry civilization was a civilization located in Southwest Amazonia, in the region of the Acre River. It built extensive networks of roads and geometrical earthworks.

== Rediscovery ==
In 2024, satellite imagery of recently deforested areas was used to map a network of earthworks, suggesting wide-scale and ancient human activity in the region. The study also suggested that investigating adjacent forested areas could lead to major discoveries.

A several years-long project involving many flyovers equipped with canopy-penetrating Lidar led to a major revision of the scale and potential influence of this civilization.
