= Liberdade River =

Liberdade River may refer to the following rivers in Brazil:

- Liberdade River (Juruá River)
- Liberdade River (Xingu River)
