= Caeté River (Acre) =

- Location within Brazil
- Native name: Rio Caeté (Portuguese)

Location
- Country: Brazil

Physical characteristics
- Source
  - location: Acre state
- Mouth
  - coordinates: 9.049373°S 68.648073°W

Caeté River is a river of Acre state in western Brazil, a tributary of the Iaco River.

The Caeté River flows through the centre of the 750,795 hectares (1,855,250 acres) Cazumbá-Iracema Extractive Reserve, established in 2002 to support sustainable use of the natural resources by the traditional population.

== See also ==
- List of rivers of Acre
