= Acuriá River =

Acuriá River Acariá River

Location
- Country: Brazil

Physical characteristics
- Source
  - location: Acre state
- Mouth
  - coordinates: 9°04′25″S 72°41′07″W

Acuriá RiverThe Acuriá River (sometimes spelled Acariá River) is a river in Acre state in western Brazil. It is one of the main tributaries of the Juruá River.

== See also ==
- List of rivers of Acre
