= Igarapé São João =

Location
- Country: Brazil

Physical characteristics
- Source
  - location: Acre state
- Mouth
  - coordinates: 9°9′S 72°41′W

The Igarapé São João is a river of Acre state in western Brazil.

== See also ==
- List of rivers of Acre
