= Igarapé Sindrichal =

Coordinates: 9°48′S 70°04′W

Location
- Country: Brazil

Physical characteristics
- Source
  - location: Acre state

Igarapé Sindrichal is a river of Acre state in western Brazil.

== See also ==
- List of rivers of Acre
