= Jurupari River =

Location
- Country: Brazil

Physical characteristics
- Source
  - location: Acre state
- Mouth
  - location: Amazonas state
  - coordinates: 7°45′S 70°10′W

Jurupari River is a river of Acre and Amazonas states in western Brazil.

== See also ==
- List of rivers of Acre
- List of rivers of Amazonas (Brazilian state)
- Satanoperca jurupari
