= Tejo River =

Coordinates: 8°59′01″S 72°42′56″W

Location
- Country: Brazil

Physical characteristics
- Source
  - location: Acre state

Tejo River is a river of Acre state in western Brazil.

== See also ==
- List of rivers of Acre
