= Santa Rosa River (Acre) =

- Location within Brazil
- Native name: Rio Santa Rosa (Portuguese)

Location
- Country: Peru, Brazil

Physical characteristics
- Mouth
  - location: Purus River, Santa Rosa do Purus
  - coordinates: 9.428588°S 70.495129°W

Basin features
- River system: Purus River

Santa Rosa River is a river of Acre state in western Brazil, a tributary of the Purus River.

The river defines the boundary between Peru and Brazil in the centre of the state of Acre, then runs for a short distance along the boundary of the 231,555 hectares (572,180 acres) Santa Rosa do Purus National Forest, a sustainable use conservation unit created in 2001, until it joins the Purus River opposite the community of Santa Rosa do Purus.

== See also ==
- List of rivers of Acre
