= William Chandless =

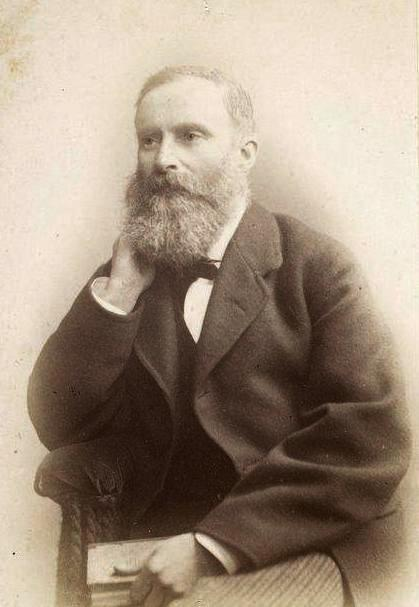
- Portrait of Chandless by the Brighton-based photographer Antonio Martinucci, 1880. BnF Gallica
- Born: 7 November 1829
- Died: 5 May 1896 (aged 66)

William Chandless (7 November 1829–5 May 1896) was an English explorer of the Amazon Basin in the 1860s.

== Life ==
During his time in the Amazon he lived in Manaus, then in Amazonas Province, Empire of Brazil, from where he explored many of the Amazon River's southern tributaries and contacted various indigenous tribes. Arawá, the extinct language after which the Arawan language group is named, is only known from a short list of words he collected in 1867.

Chandless sent reports of his expeditions to the Royal Geographical Society, which published them in its journal. In 1866, following his survey of the Purus River, the Society awarded him its Patron's Medal.

== Death and legacy ==
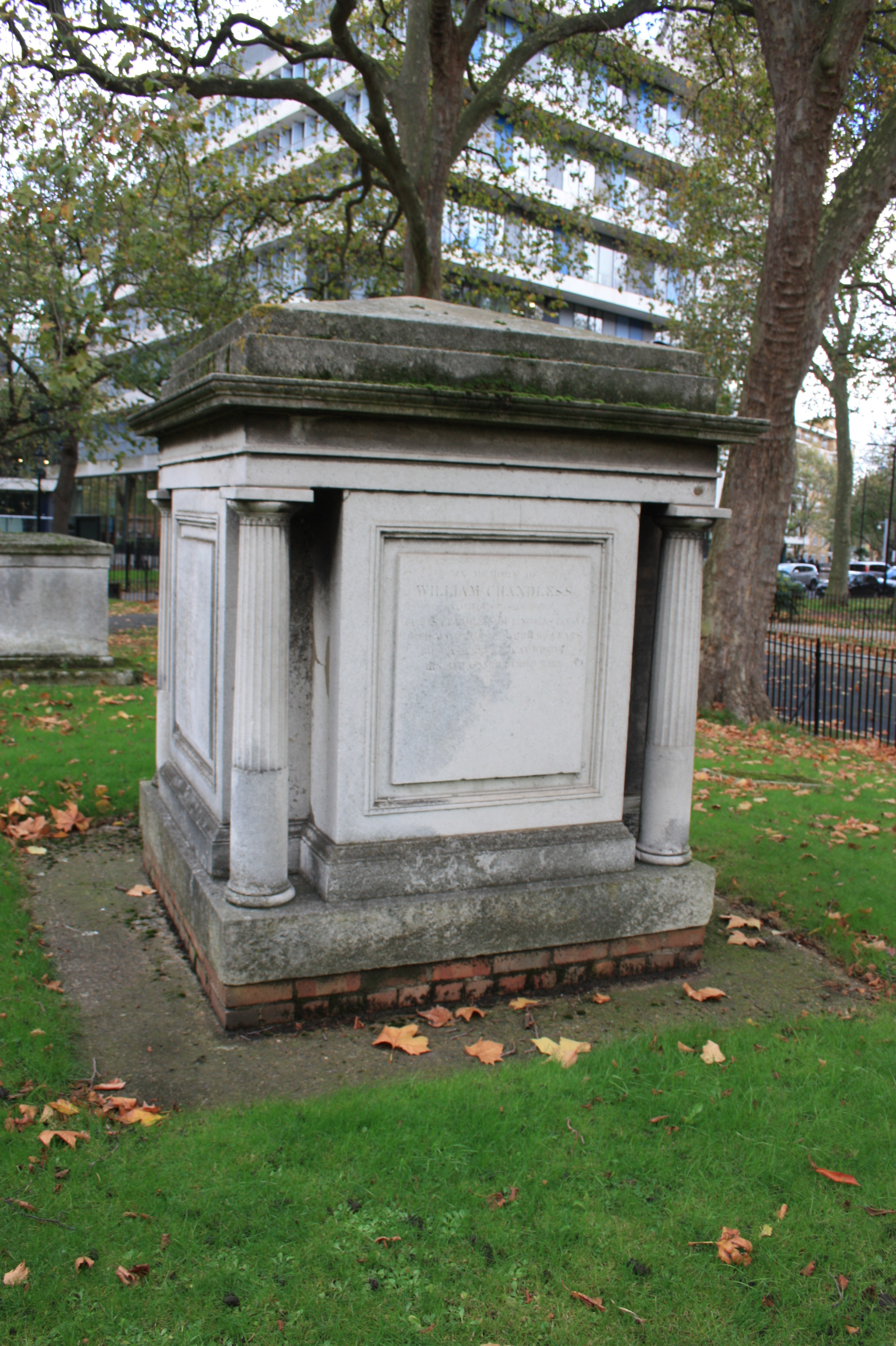
The Chandless tomb, St Marys, Paddington

Chandless died in London and is buried with his uncle, Henry Gore Chandless (1802 - 6 February 1893), and grandfather, Thomas Chandless (1760 - 11 April 1823) in a tomb, north-east of St Mary's Church in Paddington, London.

In 2003, a protected area on Brazil's border with Peru, Chandless State Park, was named in his honour. A river running through the area has also been named after him.

== Bibliography ==
- Chandless, William, A visit to Salt Lake: being a journey across the plains and a residence in the Mormon settlements at Utah, Smith, Elder and Co, London, 1857.
- William Chandless, Ascent of the River Purus, Royal Geographical Society of London: 1866.
- "British Travelers View the Saints," Snow, Edwina Jo, BYU Studies Quarterly, 1991
