= Igarapé Natal =

Location
- Country: Brazil

Physical characteristics
- Source
  - location: Acre state
- Mouth
  - coordinates: 8°21′S 72°43′W

The Igarapé Natal is a river of Acre state in western Brazil.

== See also ==
- List of rivers of Acre
