= Espalha River =

Coordinates: 10°00′S 68°42′W

Location
- Country: Brazil

Physical characteristics
- Source
  - location: Acre state

Espalha River is a river of Acre state in western Brazil.

== See also ==
- List of rivers of Acre
