= Branco River (Acre) =

Coordinates: 10.0416°S 67.8629°W

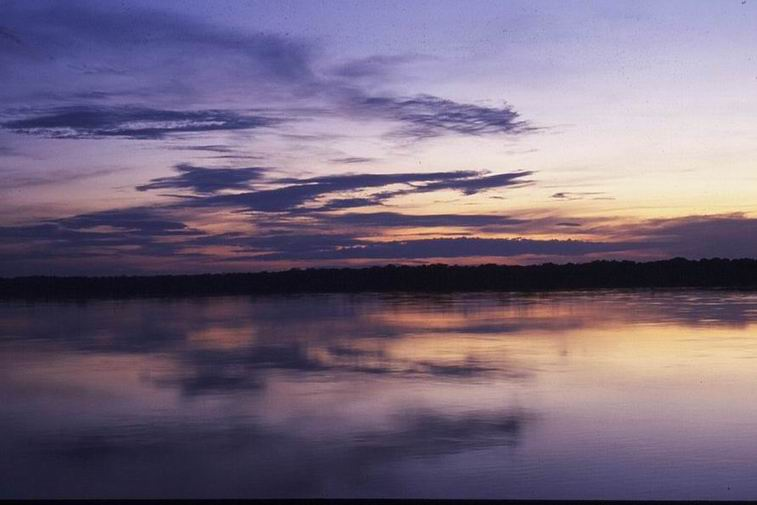

Location
- Country: Brazil

Physical characteristics
- Source
  - location: Acre state

Branco River (engl. White River) is a river of Acre state in western Brazil. The capital of Acre, Rio Branco, is on this river. The river flows into the Acre River.

== See also ==
- List of rivers of Acre
