= Valparaiso River (Brazil) =

Location
- Country: Brazil

Physical characteristics
- Source
  - location: Acre state
- Mouth
  - coordinates: 8°1′S 72°45′W

Valparaiso River is a river of Acre state in western Brazil.

== See also ==
- List of rivers of Acre
