= Juruá-Mirim River =

Coordinates: 8.1266667°S 72.8083333°W

Location
- Country: Brazil

Physical characteristics
- Source
  - location: Acre state

Juruá-Mirim River is a river of Acre state in western Brazil.

== See also ==
- List of rivers of Acre
