= Igarapé Paraná =

Coordinates: 7°15′S 72°24′W

Location
- Country: Brazil

Physical characteristics
- Source
  - location: Acre state

Igarapé Paraná is a river of Acre state in western Brazil.

== See also ==
- List of rivers of Acre
