= Xapuri River =

- Location within Brazil
- Native name: Rio Xapuri (Portuguese)

Location
- Country: Brazil

Physical characteristics
- Source
  - location: Acre state
- Mouth
  - location: Xapuri
  - coordinates: 10.652311°S 68.509419°W

Basin features
- River system: Acre River

Xapuri River is a river of Acre state in western Brazil. It forms small parts of the Brazil–Peru and Brazil–Bolivia international boundaries.

The river runs through the 931,537 hectares (2,301,880 acres) Chico Mendes Extractive Reserve, a sustainable use environmental unit created in 1990. It joins the Acre River at Xapuri.

== See also ==
- List of rivers of Acre
