= Ituxi River =

- Location within Brazil
- Native name: Rio Ituxi (Portuguese)

Location
- Country: Brazil

Physical characteristics
- Mouth
  - location: Purus River
  - coordinates: 7.310352°S 64.854817°W
- Length: 640 km (400 mi)
- Basin size: 43,676 km^{2} (16,863 mi^{2})
- Discharge
  - location: Confluence of Purus, Amazonas State
  - average: 1,263 m^{3}/s (44,600 cu ft/s)

Basin features
- Tributaries
  - left: Iquiri River

Ituxi River is a river of Amazonas state in north-western Brazil. It is a tributary of the Purus River.

== Course ==
The Ituxi River is 640 kilometres (400 mi) in length. It originates near Acrelândia in the state of Acre. It is a blackwater river that flows through the 776,940 hectares (1,919,900 acres) Ituxi Extractive Reserve, created in 2008, in a northeast direction.

== See also ==
- List of rivers of Acre
- List of rivers of Amazonas (Brazilian state)
