= Bagé River =

River in Acre, Brazil

Location
- Country: Brazil

Physical characteristics
- Source
  - location: Acre state
- Mouth
  - coordinates: 8°56′S 72°33′W

Bagé River is a river of Acre state in western Brazil.

== See also ==
- List of rivers of Acre
