= Ouro River (Acre) =

Location
- Country: Brazil

Physical characteristics
- Source
  - location: Acre state
- Mouth
  - coordinates: 8°23′S 72°50′W

Ouro River is a river in the Acre state of western Brazil.

== See also ==
- List of rivers of Acre
