= Omar Sabino =

Brazilian lawyer and politician (1932–2011)

Vice Governor of Acre
- In office 15 March 1975 – 15 March 1979
- Governor: Geraldo Gurgel de Mesquita
- Preceded by: Alberto Barbosa da Costa
- Succeeded by: José Fernandes Rego

Personal details
- Born: 25 July 1932 Manoel Urbano, Acre, Brazil
- Died: 22 July 2011 (aged 78) Rio de Janeiro, Rio de Janeiro, Brazil
- Party: Progressives
- Other political affiliations: PDS; ARENA

Omar Sabino de Paula (25 July 1932 – 22 July 2011) was a Brazilian lawyer, professor, and politician. He served as the Vice Governor of Acre from 1975 to 1979. He served as rector of the Federal University of Acre.
