= Acurauá River =

- Location within Brazil
- Native name: Rio Acurauá (Portuguese)

Location
- Country: Brazil

Physical characteristics
- Source
  - location: Acre state
- Mouth
  - location: Tarauacá River, Envira
  - coordinates: 7.681926°S 70.575988°W

Basin features
- River system: Tarauacá River

The Acurauá River (Portuguese: Rio Acurauá is a river in the states of Acre and Amazonas in western Brazil. It is a tributary of the Tarauacá River.

== Course ==
The river rises in the west of the state of Acre and flows in a northeast direction.

After being crossed by the BR-364 highway, it forms the eastern boundary of the 216,062 hectares (533,900 acres) Rio Gregório State Forest, a sustainable use conservation unit created in 2004.

It then crosses into Amazonas state, where it joins the Tarauacá.

== See also ==
- List of rivers of Acre
- List of rivers of Amazonas (Brazilian state)
