= Igarapé Cochichá =

Location
- Country: Brazil

Physical characteristics
- Source
  - location: Acre state
- Mouth
  - coordinates: 9°29′S 70°2′W

Igarapé Cochichá is a river of Acre state in western Brazil.

== See also ==
- List of rivers of Acre
