= Manoel Urbano =

Municipality of Acre, Brazil

Municipality of Manoel Urbano
- Municipality
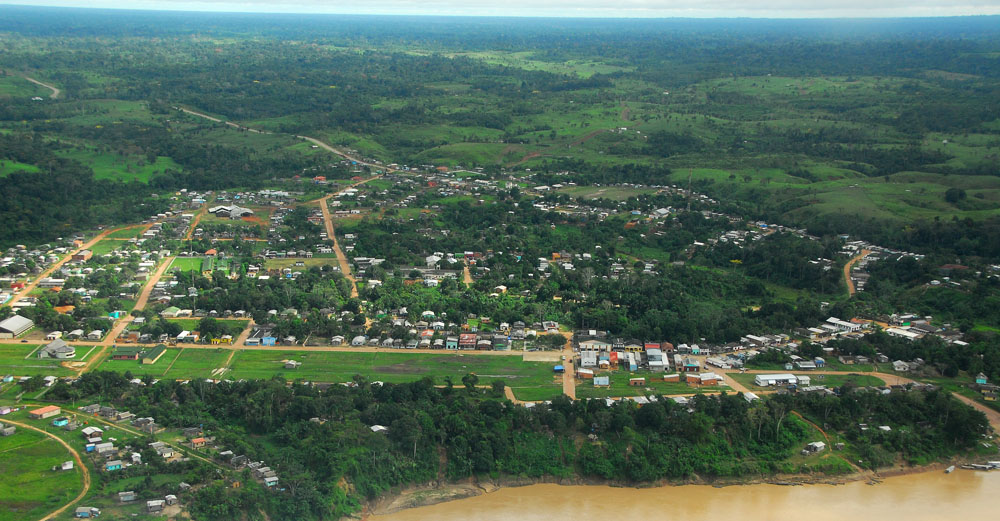
- Aerial view of Manoel Urbano, Acre

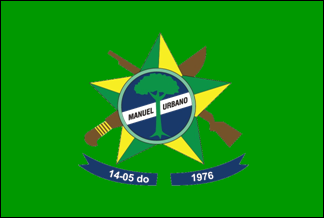
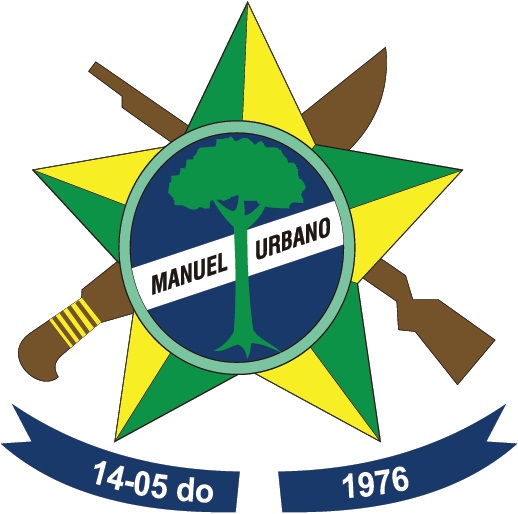
- Flag Coat of arms

- Location of Manoel Urbano in Acre
- Coordinates: 08°50′20″S 69°15′36″W
- Country: Brazil
- State: Acre

Government
  - Mayor: José Altanízio Taumaturgo Sá (PMDB)

Area
  - Total: 3,624 sq mi (9,387 km^{2})

Population (2020 est)
  - Total: 9,581
- Time zone: UTC−5 (ACT)

Manoel Urbano (Brazilian Portuguese pronunciation: [mɐnuˈɛw uʁˈbɐnu]) is a municipality located in the center-western region of the Brazilian state of Acre. As of 2010 it was one of the poorest municipalities in Brazil, with a low Human Development Index.

== Geography ==
Manoel Urbano is in the state of Acre, the Vale do Acre mesoregion and the Sena Madureira microregion. It is 244 kilometres (152 mi) from the state capital, Rio Branco, along the BR-364, which is paved to the municipality. It is bounded on the north by the state of Amazonas, on the south and east by the municipality of Sena Madureira, on the west by the municipality of Santa Rosa do Purus, on the northwest by the municipality of Feijó and on the southwest by Peru. Its area is 9,387 square kilometres (3,624 sq mi).

The municipality contains 2% of the 750,795-hectare (1,855,250-acre) Cazumbá-Iracema Extractive Reserve, established in 2002 to support sustainable use of the natural resources by the traditional population. It also contains about 66% of the 695,303-hectare (1,718,130-acre) Chandless State Park, created in 2004, which protects an area of rainforest with bamboos that contains various endemic species of flora and fauna.

== History ==
The history of European settlement dates to the end of the 19th century when two brothers, João Moaco and Zé Moaco, founded the Colocação Tabocal settlement on the right bank of the Purus River. At that time supplies and produce were shipped via the Purus by boats and smaller vessels from the ports of Belém and Manaus. One summer a boat named "Castelo" was stranded during the dry season, and was not floated until the next rainy season. The residents began to call the area "Castelo". In 1936 the residents asked the state government to make the settlement a town named after Manoel Urbano, an Amazonian mestizo from the Manacapurú region who had explored the Purus River. In the territorial division of 31 December 1936 the region was the Castelo district of the Sena Madureira municipality. On 1 March 1963 the municipality of Manoel Urbano was separated from Sena Madureira.

== Demographics ==
In the 2010 Census, its population was 7,981, divided between 5,278 urban and 2,703 rural. As of 2010 the municipality ranked 5186 out of 5565 of Brazilian municipalities on the Human Development Index. The overall index was 0.551. Income was 0.586, longevity was 0.767 and education was 0.373. As of 1 July 2014 the estimated population was 8,514. In 2020, IBGE estimated the population at 9,581.

== Notable people ==
- Omar Sabino (1932 – 2011), politician. Former Vice Governor of Acre.
- Iolanda Fleming (born 1936), politician. Former Governor of Acre and first woman to become a state governor in Brazil.

== Sources ==
- Estimativas da população residente no brasil e unidades da federação com data de referência em 1º de julho de 2014 (PDF) (in Portuguese), IBGE
- Localização (in Portuguese), Município Manoel Urbano-AC, archived from the original on 2015-05-01
- Manoel Urbano Acre Histórico (PDF) (in Portuguese), Confederação Nacional de Municípios
- PES Chandless (in Portuguese), ISA: Instituto Socioambiental
- População - Manoel Urano (AC) (in Portuguese), IBGE, Censo Demográfico 2010
- Ranking IDHM Municípios 2010 (in Portuguese), PNUD: Programa das Nações Unidas para o Desenvolvimento, archived from the original on 2016-06-10
- RESEX do Cazumbá-Iracema (in Portuguese), ISA: Instituto Socioambiental
