= Chandless State Park =

State park in Acre, Brazil

- Parque Estadual Chandless
- IUCN category II (national park)
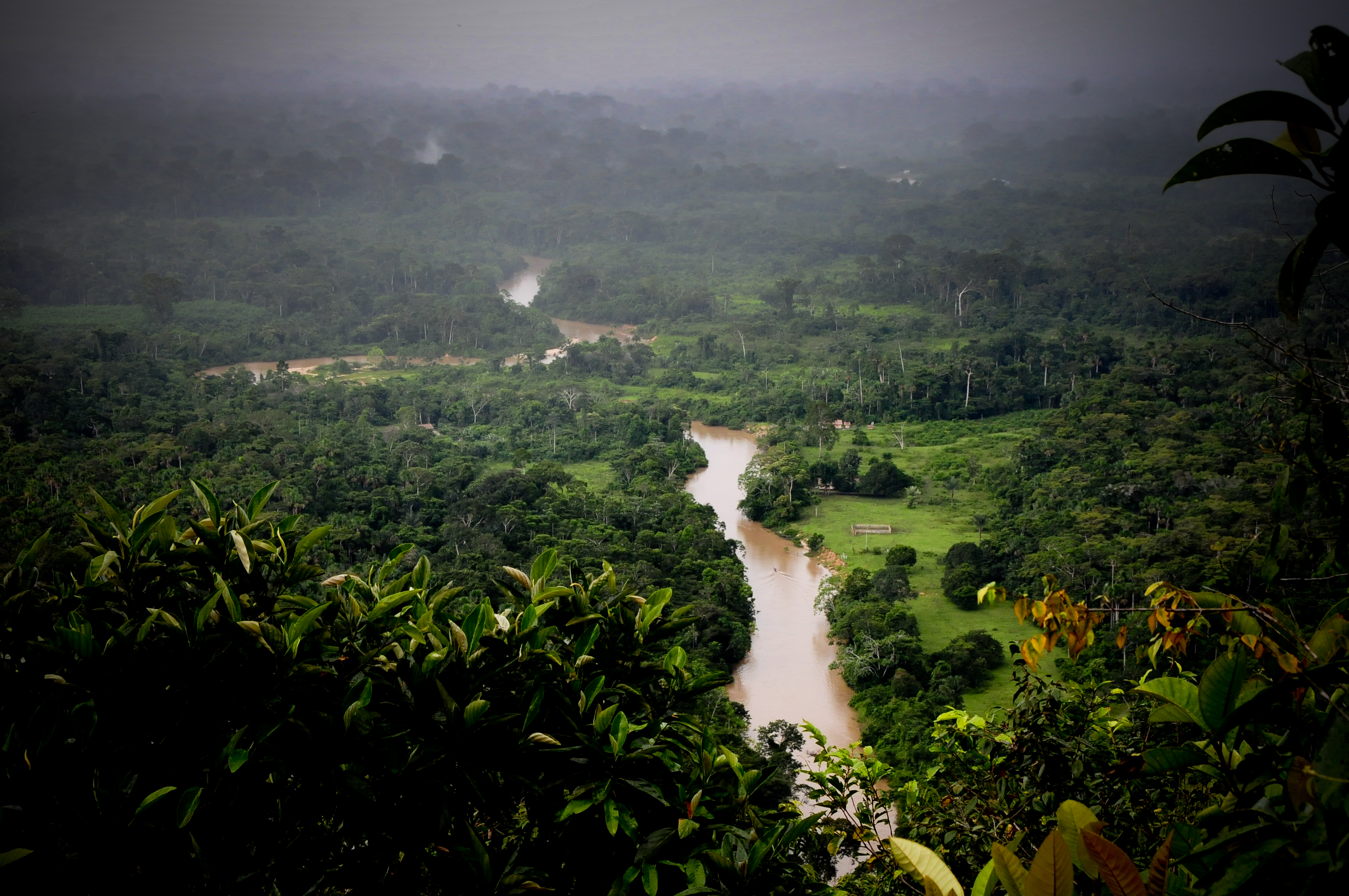
- View of the park, with a settlement in the foreground

- Location within Brazil
- Nearest city: Manoel Urbano, Acre
- Coordinates: 10.022291°S 70.360337°W
- Area: 695,303 hectares (1,718,130 acres)
- Designation: State park
- Created: 2 September 2004
- Administrator: Instituto de Meio Ambiente do Acre

The Chandless State Park (Portuguese: Parque Estadual Chandless) is a state park in the state of Acre, Brazil. It protects an important but relatively unexplored region of rainforest with bamboos holding great biodiversity. It is valuable as an ecological corridor between adjoining conservation units and indigenous territories. Some parts of the park are used by uncontacted nomadic indigenous people.

== Location ==
Conservation units in east Acre. 7: Chandless State Park

The Chandless State Park is in the municipalities of Sena Madureira (11.73%), Santa Rosa do Purus (22.68%) and Manoel Urbano (65.59%) in the state of Acre. The park is bordered to the west by the international border with Peru and Peru's Manú National Park. To the east it adjoins the Cazumbá-Iracema Extractive Reserve. It adjoins the Alto Rio Purus Indigenous Territory to the north and the Mamoadate Indigenous Territory to the south. The park has an area of 695,303 hectares (1,718,130 acres). It is difficult to access. The headquarters may be reached by boat from Manuel Urbano or by charter float plane from Rio Branco. The forest is hard to penetrate due to large numbers of bamboos with thorns.

The park lies in the Purus River basin. The Chandless River enters the park from Peru and runs through it in a north east direction, joining the Purus River to the north of the park. The main tributaries of the Chandless are the Cuchichá and Chandless-chá streams. The Cuchicá forms the northern border of the park to the point where it joins the Chandless. The terrain is part of the Amazon plain with extensive wetlands, periodically flooded areas and many creeks and lakes, including oxbow lakes. Aspects of natural beauty include dry ravines 15 metres (49 ft) deep, rocky outcrops, small rapids and sandy beaches.

== Environment ==
Average annual rainfall is 1,773 to 2,086 millimetres (69.8 to 82.1 in). Average annual temperature is from 24.3 to 25.1 °C (75.7 to 77.2 °F). The rivers are white water and vary in depth depending on the season. They are full between October and May, and lowest between June and September.

The flora and fauna are still poorly understood. The park is in the centre of the bamboo forest region of the south western Amazon biome, and has three endemic species of the Guadua genus of bamboo. Vegetation is classified as forest with palms, forest with bamboo, alluvial forest with bamboo and dense forest. A rapid Rapid Ecological Assessment completed in 2010 for the park's management plan identified 264 plant species including 24 of palm trees. It found 407 species of birds, 47 species of large mammals, 63 species of amphibians, 40 species of reptiles and 71 species of fish. There are estimated to be at least 800 bird species, including migratory species and at least 13 endemic species associated with the bamboo, 100 species of moths and butterflies, 200 of mammals, 120 of amphibians, 80 of reptiles and 200 of fish.

== Conservation ==
The Chandless State Park was created by state decree 10.670 of 2 September 2004. A consultative council was created on 8 September 2009 and the management plan was approved on 16 May 2011. It is managed by the Instituto de Meio Ambiente do Acre. The conservation unit is supported by the Amazon Region Protected Areas Program. The objective is to preserve natural ecosystems of great ecological importance, and to enable scientific research, education, environmental interpretation, recreation in contact with nature and eco-tourism.

The forest is part of the western Amazon green corridor defined by the Brazilian Institute of Environment and Renewable Natural Resources (IBAMA). It adjoins protected areas and indigenous territories on the Peruvian side where rare and endemic species have recently been found. It may also serve as a local corridor connecting the Rio Purus and Mamoadate indigenous territories and the Rio Acre Ecological Station. There is good potential for ecotourism.

Part of the region is used by nomadic Mashco-Piro people, who have not been contacted. There does not appear to be much settlement pressure on the park. The nearby municipalities still have more than half of their settlement capacity unused, and the park is difficult to access during dry periods. When the park was formed there were 12 families in the area with about 60 people engaged in activities that have little impact on the environment. They were in favour of creating the park and wanted to help monitor and protect it.

== Sources ==
- Full list: PAs supported by ARPA, ARPA
- PE Chandless (in Portuguese), PPBio: Programa de Pesquisa em Biodiversidade
- PES Chandless (in Portuguese), ISA: Instituto Socioambiental
