= Breu River =

Coordinates: 9°24′47″S 72°43′00″W

Location
- Country: Brazil

Physical characteristics
- Source
  - location: Acre state

Breu River is a river of Acre state in western Brazil.

== See also ==
- List of rivers of Acre
