= Grajaú River (Acre) =

Location
- Country: Brazil

Physical characteristics
- Source
  - location: Acre state
- Mouth
  - coordinates: 8°33′S 72°49′W

Grajaú River is a river of Acre state in western Brazil.

== See also ==
- List of rivers of Acre
