= Muru River =

- Location within Brazil

Location
- Country: Brazil

Physical characteristics
- Source
  - location: Acre state
- Mouth
  - coordinates: 8°9′S 70°45′W

Muru River is a river of Acre state in western Brazil.

== See also ==
- List of rivers of Acre
