= Liberdade River (Juruá River tributary) =

Location
- Country: Brazil

Physical characteristics
- Source
  - location: Acre state
- Mouth: Juruá River
  - location: Amazonas state
  - coordinates: 7°11′S 71°49′W

Liberdade River is a river of Acre and Amazonas states in western Brazil. It is a tributary of the Juruá River.

== See also ==
- List of rivers of Acre
- List of rivers of Amazonas (Brazilian state)
