= Chandless River =

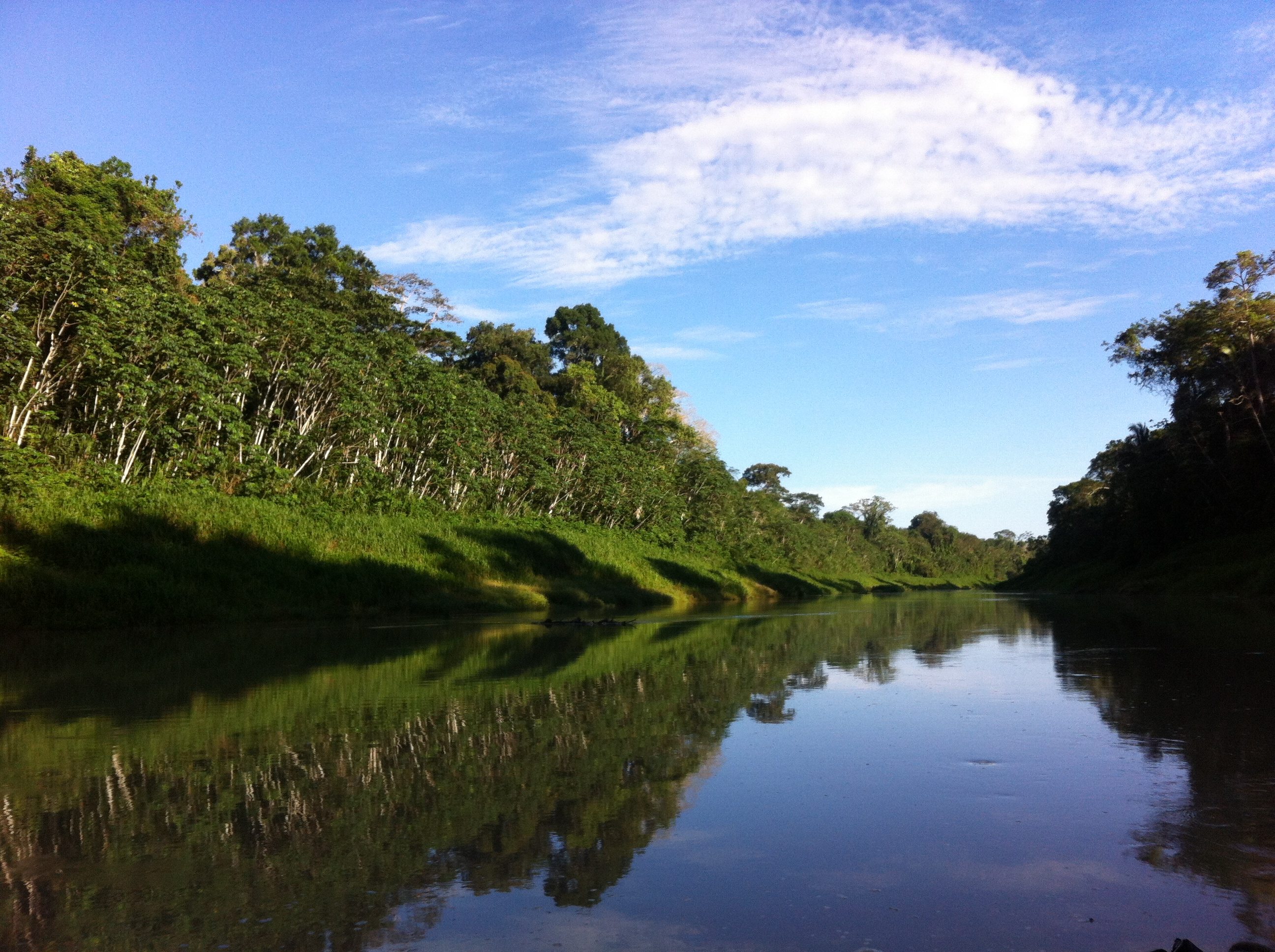

- Location within Brazil

Location
- Country: Peru, Brazil

Physical characteristics
- Mouth
  - location: Purus River
  - coordinates: 9.144444°S 69.839722°W
- Length: 370

Basin features
- Progression: Rio Chandless
- River system: Chandless River

Chandless River is a river of Peru and the Acre state in western Brazil, named after the British explorer William Chandless. It is a tributary of the Purus River

The river originates in Peru. After crossing the border into Brazil it flows in a north east direction through the 695,303 hectares (1,718,130 acres) Chandless State Park, created in 2004, which protects an area of rainforest with bamboos that contains various endemic species of flora and fauna. The main tributaries of the Chandless in this section are the Cuchichá and Chandless-chá streams. The Cuchicá forms the northern border of the park to the point where it joins the Chandless. The Chandless joins the Purus to the north of the park.

== See also ==
- List of rivers of Acre
