= Rio Jaminauá =

River in Acre, Brazil

Location
- Country: Brazil

Physical characteristics
- Source
  - location: Acre state
- Mouth
  - coordinates: 9°21′S 71°1′W

Rio Jaminauá (Brazilian Portuguese pronunciation: [ʒaminaˈwa]) is a river of Acre state in western Brazil.

== See also ==
- List of rivers of Acre
