= Tarauacá River =

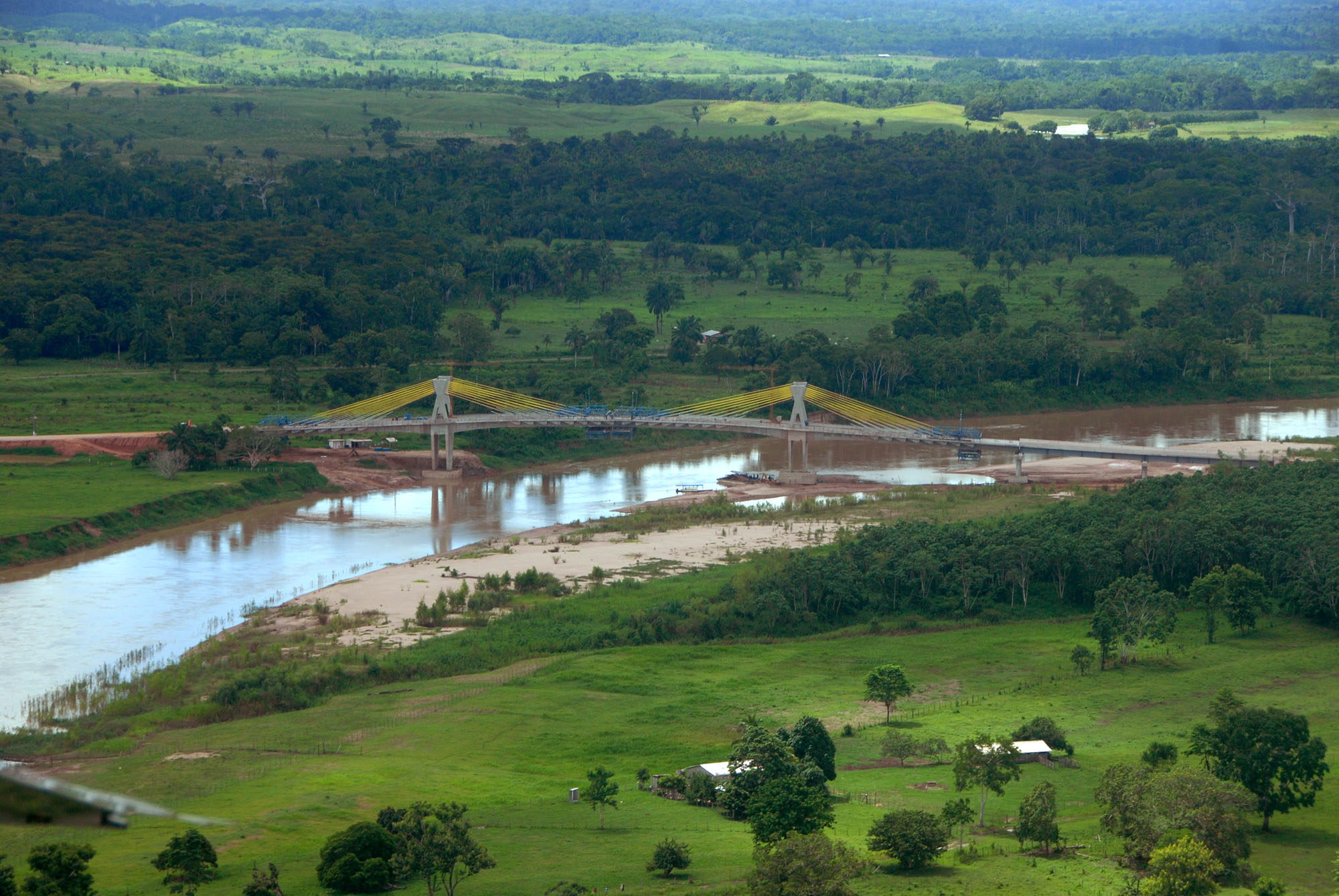

- Location within Brazil
- Native name: Rio Tarauacá (Portuguese)

Location
- Country: Brazil

Physical characteristics
- Source
  - location: Acre state
- Mouth
  - location: Juruá River, Amazonas state
  - coordinates: 6.695257°S 69.764563°W

Basin features
- River system: Juruá River
- Tributaries
  - left: Acurauá River

Tarauacá River (Portuguese: Rio Tarauacá [taɾawaˈka]) is a river of Amazonas and Acre states in western Brazil. The Rio Tarauacá is a tributary of the Juruá River, which itself flows into the Amazon.

== Course ==
The headwaters of the Tarauacá are located near the Brazilian border with Peru. It is upper reaches it flows from south to north through the Alto Tarauacá Extractive Reserve, created in 2000. The Brazilian cities of Tarauacá and Eirunepé lie along the banks of the Tarauacá River further east.

== See also ==
- List of rivers of Acre
- List of rivers of Amazonas
