= Iaco River =

River in Brazil

Coordinates: 9°03′S 68°34′W

Iaco River Yaco River
- Location within Brazil

Location
- Country: Brazil, Peru

Physical characteristics
- Mouth: Purus River
- Length: 480 km (300 mi)

Iaco River is a river of Acre and Amazonas states in western Brazil.

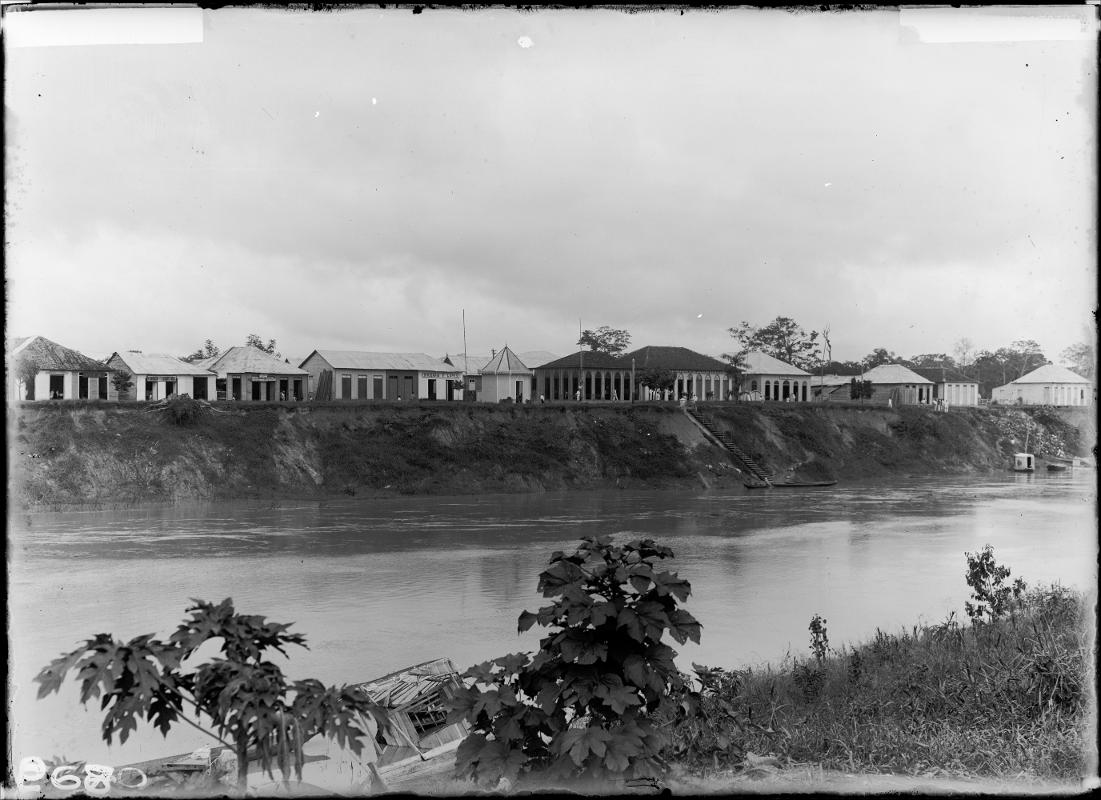
"Rio Iaco." Photograph circa 1913.

== See also ==
- List of rivers of Acre
- List of rivers of Amazonas (Brazilian state)
