= Sena Madureira =

Municipality of Acre, Brazil

- Municipality
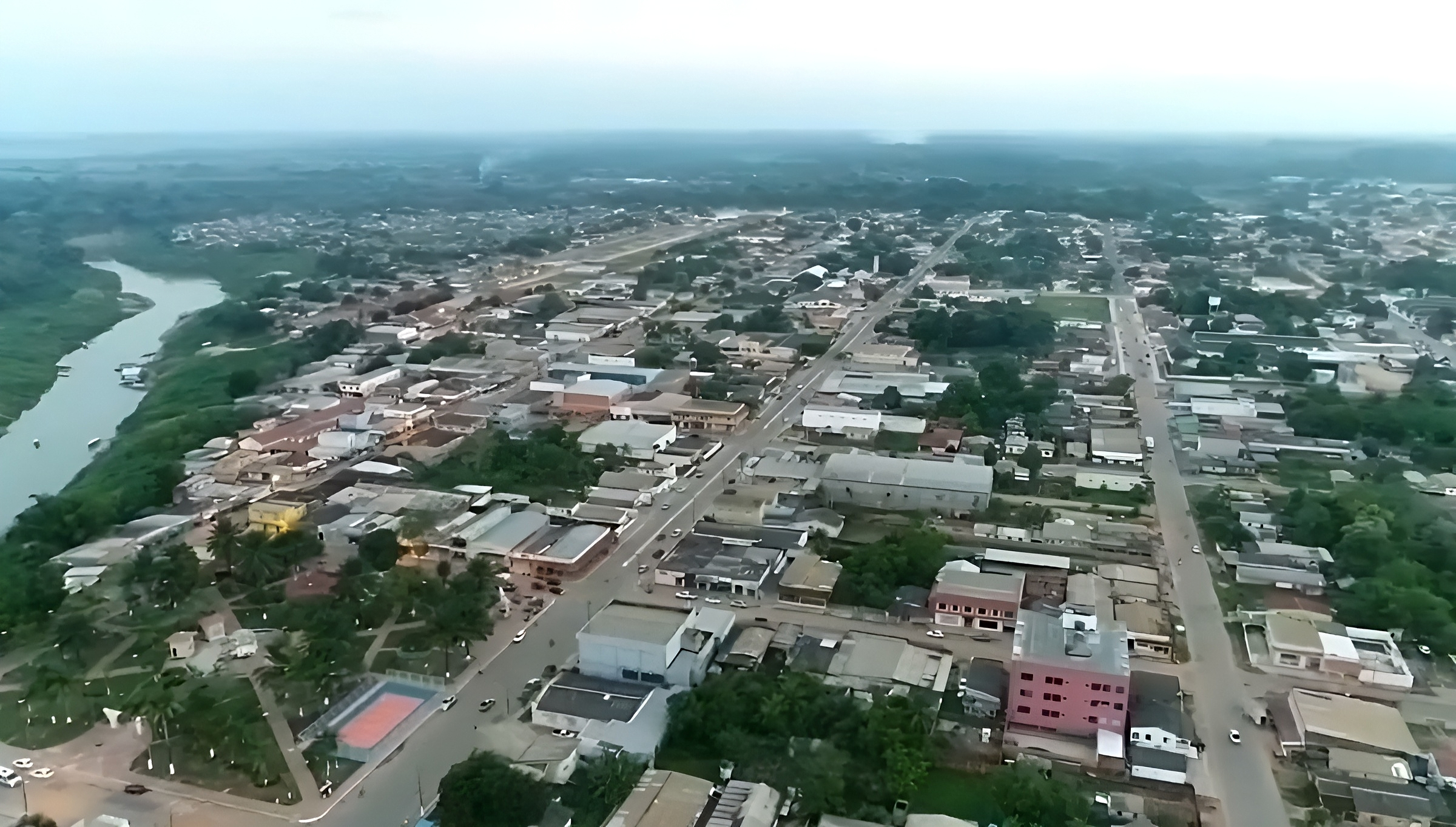

- Flag Coat of arms

- Location of municipality in Acre State

- Location in Brazil
- Coordinates: 09°03′57″S 68°39′25″W
- Country: Brazil
- Region: North
- State: Acre
- Founded: September 25, 1904 (117 years)
- Named for: Antônio de Sena Madureira

Government
  - Mayor: Mazinho Serafim (MDB)

Area
  - Total: 9,760 sq mi (25,278 km^{2})

Population (2020 est)
  - Total: 46,511
- Time zone: UTC−5 (ACT)
- Area code: +55 (68)

Sena Madureira (Brazilian Portuguese pronunciation: [ˈsenɐ maduˈɾejɾɐ]) is a municipality located in the center of the Brazilian state of Acre. Its population is 46,511 and its area is 25,278 square kilometres (9,760 sq mi), making it the largest municipality in the state. It has a climate which combines temperatures of 78 °F (26 °C) with humidities in the upper 90s percent, all year round. It is 143 km from Rio Branco. The oldest church in Acre state is located in Sena Madureira, the Nossa Senhora da Imaculada Conceição Church (1910).

== Geography ==
The municipality contains part of the Rio Acre Ecological Station. It also contains part of the 931,537-hectare (2,301,880-acre) Chico Mendes Extractive Reserve, a sustainable use environmental unit created in 1990. It contains the 176,349-hectare (435,770-acre) Macauã National Forest, a sustainable use conservation unit created in 1988. It also contains the 21,148-hectare (52,260-acre) São Francisco National Forest, a sustainable use conservation unit created in 2001.

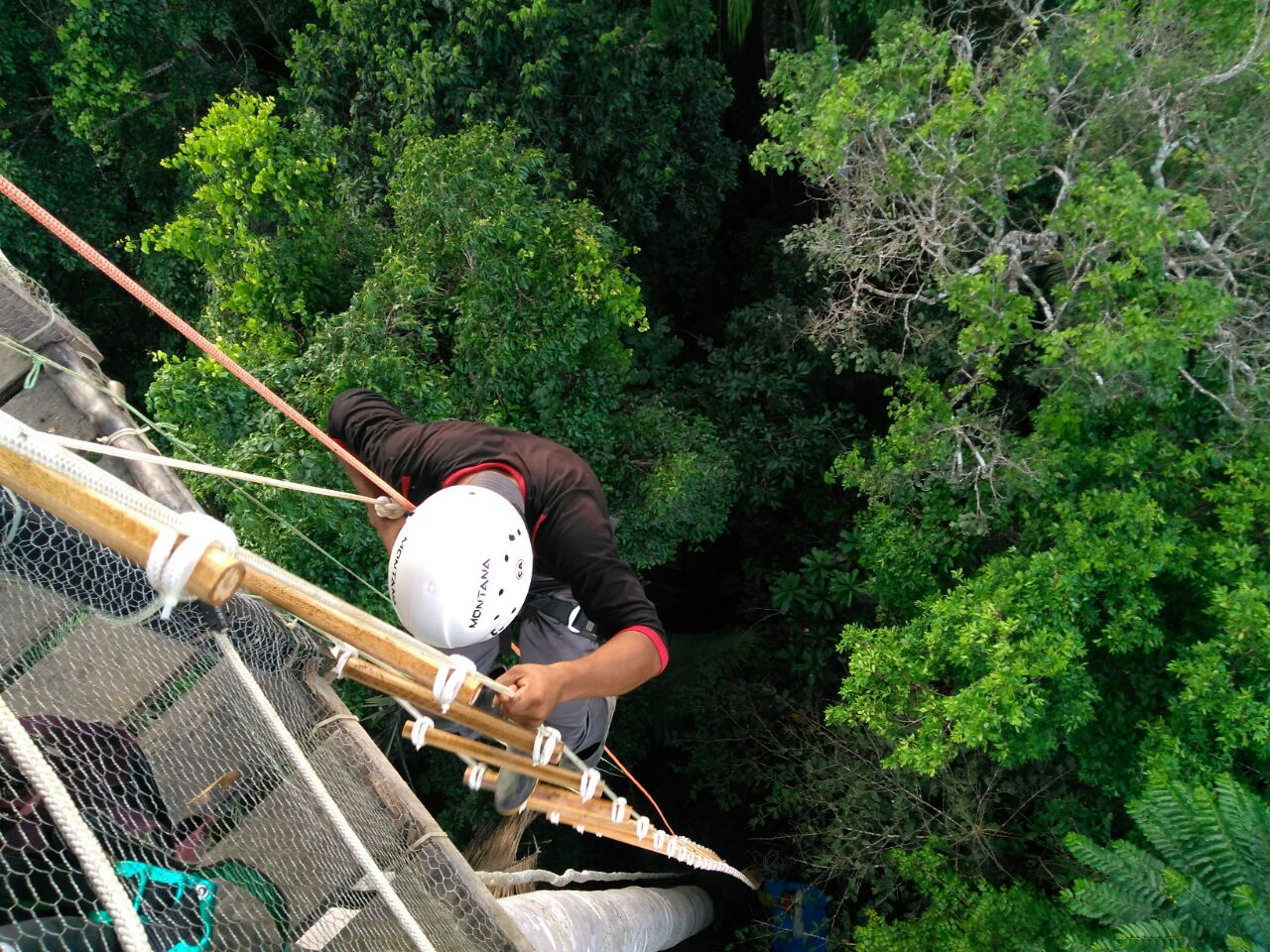
Abseiling at Chandless State Park, Sena Madureira, Acre, Brazil

It contains 98% of the 750,795-hectare (1,855,250-acre) Cazumbá-Iracema Extractive Reserve, established in 2002 to support sustainable use of the natural resources by the traditional population. The municipality contains about 12% of the 695,303-hectare (1,718,130-acre) Chandless State Park, created in 2004, which protects an area of rainforest with bamboos that contains various endemic species of flora and fauna. It contains about 27% of the 46,064-hectare (113,830-acre) Antimary State Forest, a sustainable use conservation unit established in 1997.

=== Climate ===
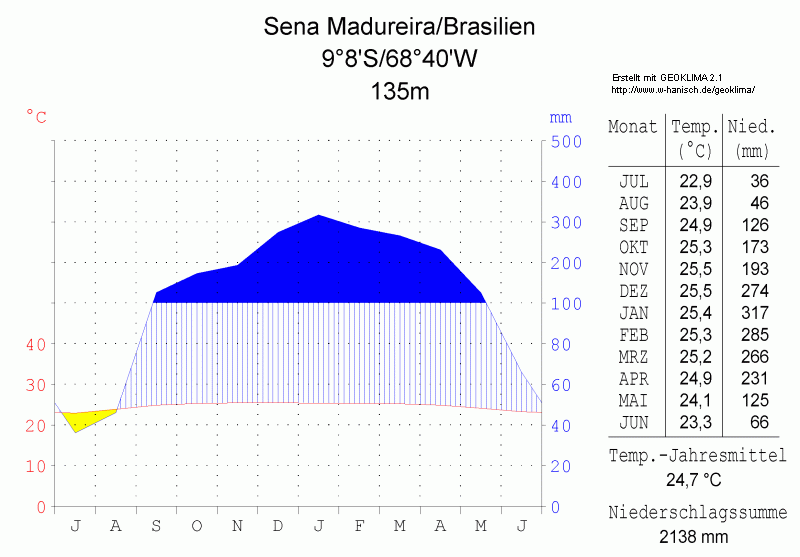
