= Acre River =

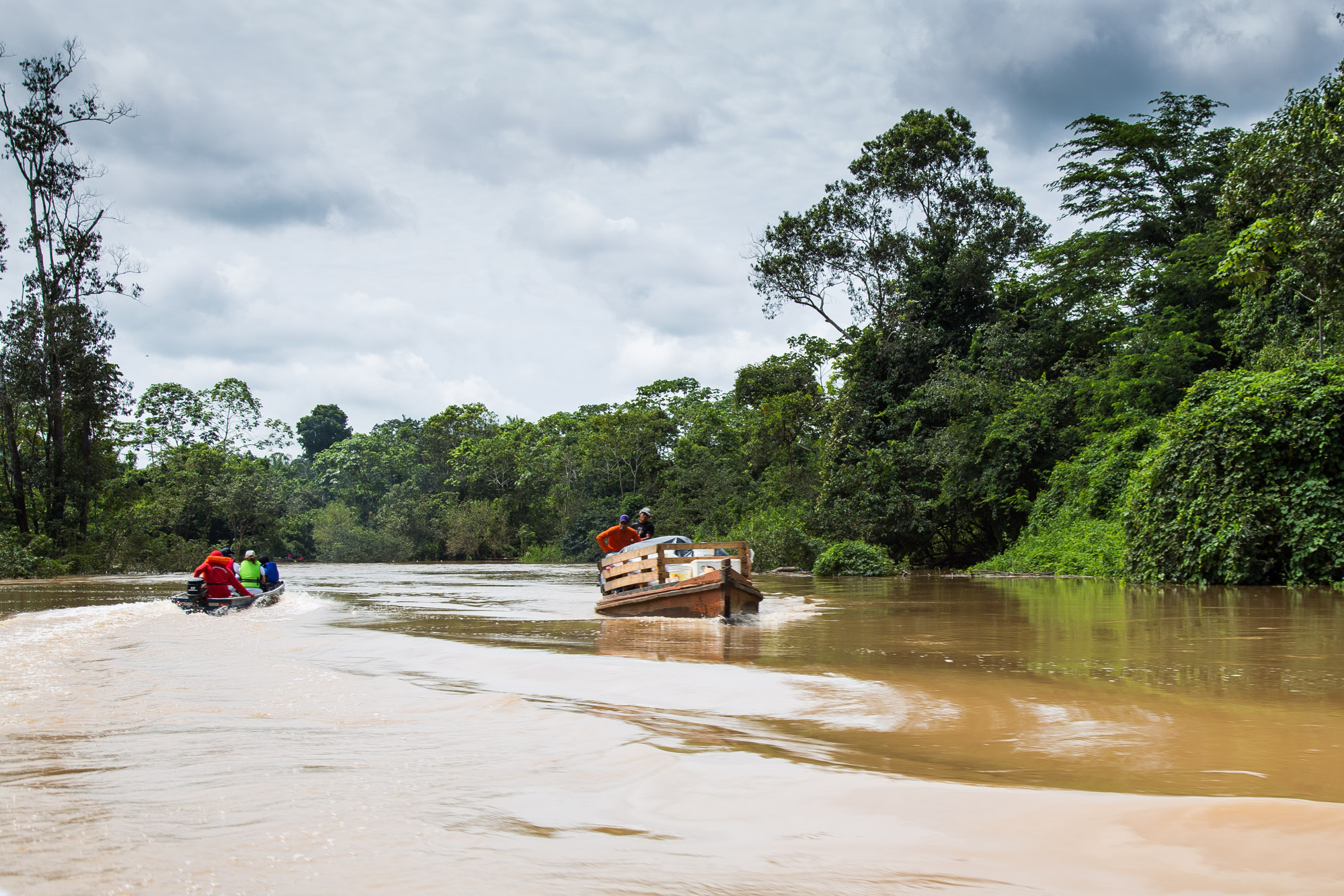
- Acre River as seen near Xapuri, Acre, Brazil

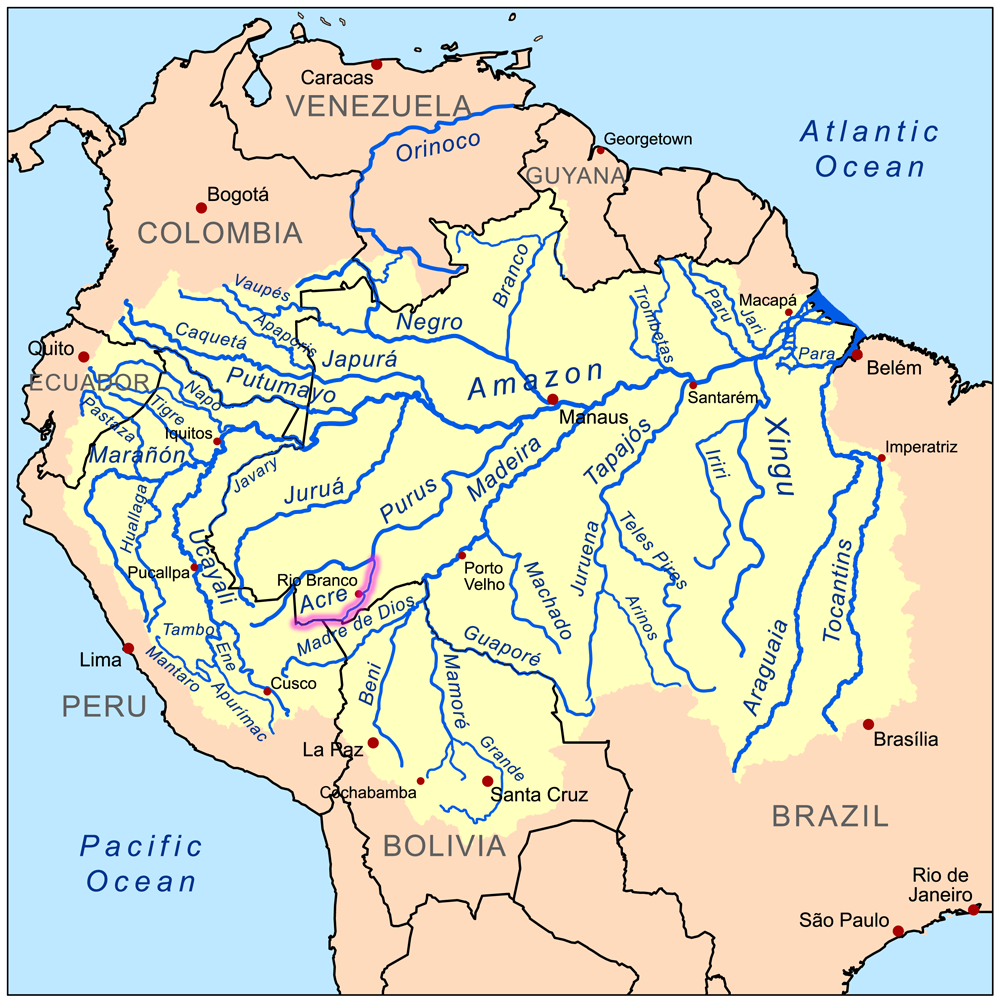
- Map of the Amazon Basin with the Acre River highlighted

Location
- Countries: Bolivia; Brazil; Peru

Physical characteristics
- Source: Acre River
  - coordinates: 10°57′47″S 70°29′38″W
  - elevation: 351 m (1,152 ft)
- Mouth: Purus River
  - location: Boca do Acre
  - coordinates: 8°45′12″S 67°24′02″W
  - elevation: 90 m (300 ft)
- Length: 680 km (420 mi)
- Basin size: 36,000 km^{2} (14,000 mi^{2})

The Acre River (called Aquiry in the local Iñapari language; locally, Rio Acre) is a 680 kilometres (420 mi) long river in central South America.

== Course ==
The river is born in Peru, and runs North-Eastwards, forming part of the border between Peru and Brazil and then part of the border between Bolivia and Brazil. It runs through the Brazilian states of Acre and Amazonas, before eventually running into the Purus River at Boca do Acre. It runs along the Bolivian frontier and flows northeastward to a junction with the Purus at 8° 45' South latitude. The name is also applied to a district situated on the same river and on the former boundary line of 1867, between Bolivia and Brazil. This region's area is estimated at 60,000 square miles (160,000 km^{2}).

It is navigable from the mouth until the Xapuri River (480 kilometres (300 mi)), even farther in the wet season from January until May. The river was an important transportation artery at the end of the 19th century due to newly discovered rubber tree forests.

The Rio Acre Ecological Station lies in the municipalities of Assis Brasil and Sena Madureira in the state of Acre, Brazil. It contains Amazon forest bounded to the north by an Indian reservation and to the south by the Acre River. It was created to preserve the headwaters of the Acre River.

== History ==
The region was settled by Peruvians between 1870 and 1878, but was invaded by Brazilian rubber collectors during the next decade (during the 'rubber boom') and became tributary to the rubber markets of Iquitos, Manaus and Pará. In 1899, the Bolivian government established a custom-house at Puerto Alonso, on the Acre river, for the collection of export duties on rubber, which precipitated a conflict with the Brazilian settlers, and finally brought about a boundary dispute between the two republics. In July 1899 the "Acreanos" declared their independence and set up a republic of their own, but in the following March they were reduced to submission by Brazil. Various disorders followed until Brazil decided to occupy Puerto Alonso with a military force. The boundary dispute was finally settled at Petropolis on November 17, 1903, through the purchase by Brazil of the rubber-producing territory, south to about the ninth parallel.
