= Amazon Military Command =

- Comando Militar da Amazonia
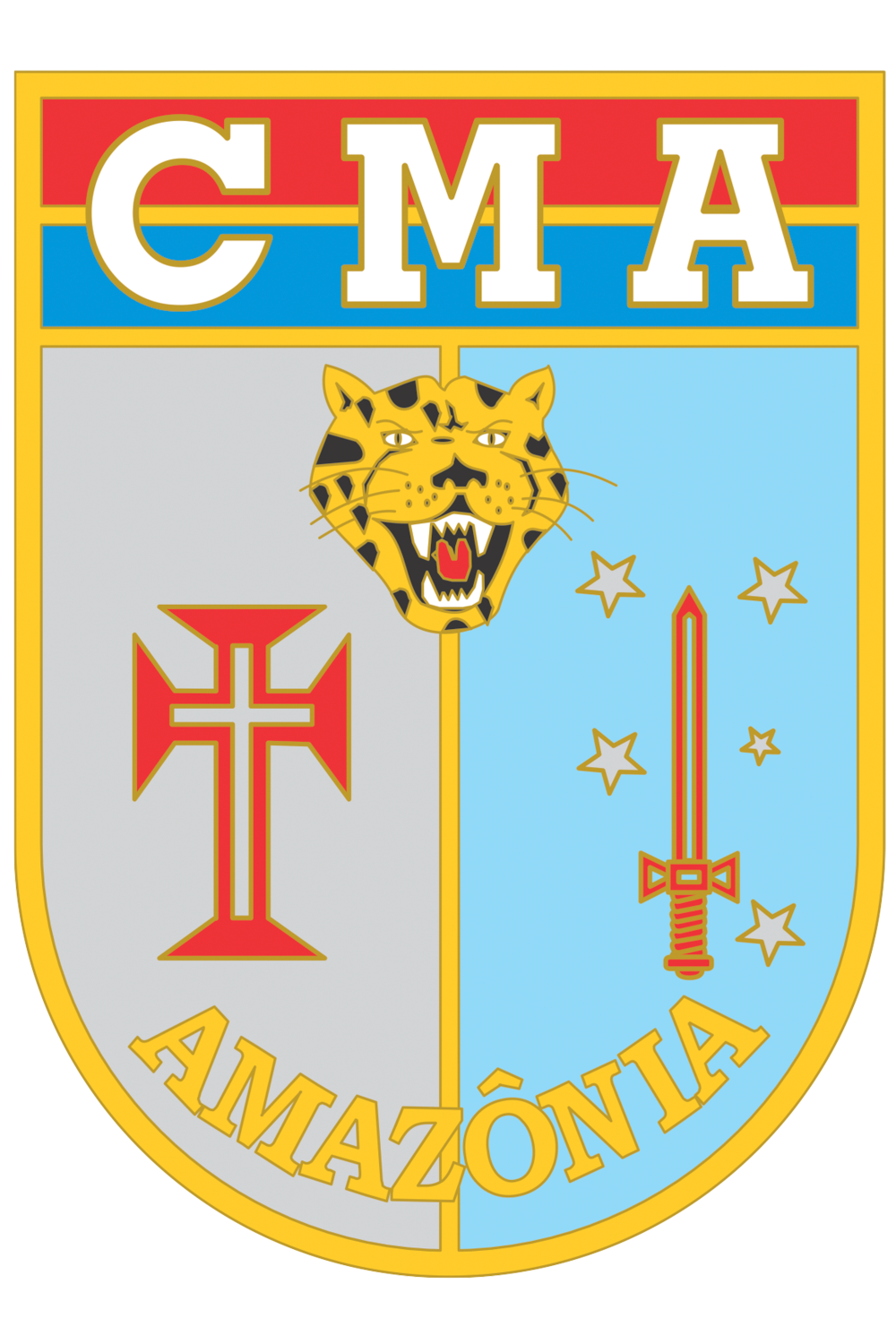
- Coat of Arms
- Active: October 27, 1956; 69 years ago
- Country: Brazil
- Branch: Brazilian Army
- Part of: Ministry of Defence
- Garrison/HQ: Manaus
- Nickname: CMA
- Website: www.cma.eb.mil.br

Commanders
- Current commander: General Ricardo Augusto Ferreira Costa Neves

The Amazon Military Command (Portuguese: Comando Militar da Amazônia or CMA) is one of eight Military Commands of the Brazilian Army. The Amazon Military Command is responsible for the defence of the Amazon Basin. Four Infantry Brigades specializing in Jungle warfare, one construction Engineer Brigade and one Military Regional Command are subordinated to the CMA. Its area of responsibility covers the states of Amazonas, Acre, Roraima and Rondônia.

== Organization ==
Amazon Military Command area as of 2024

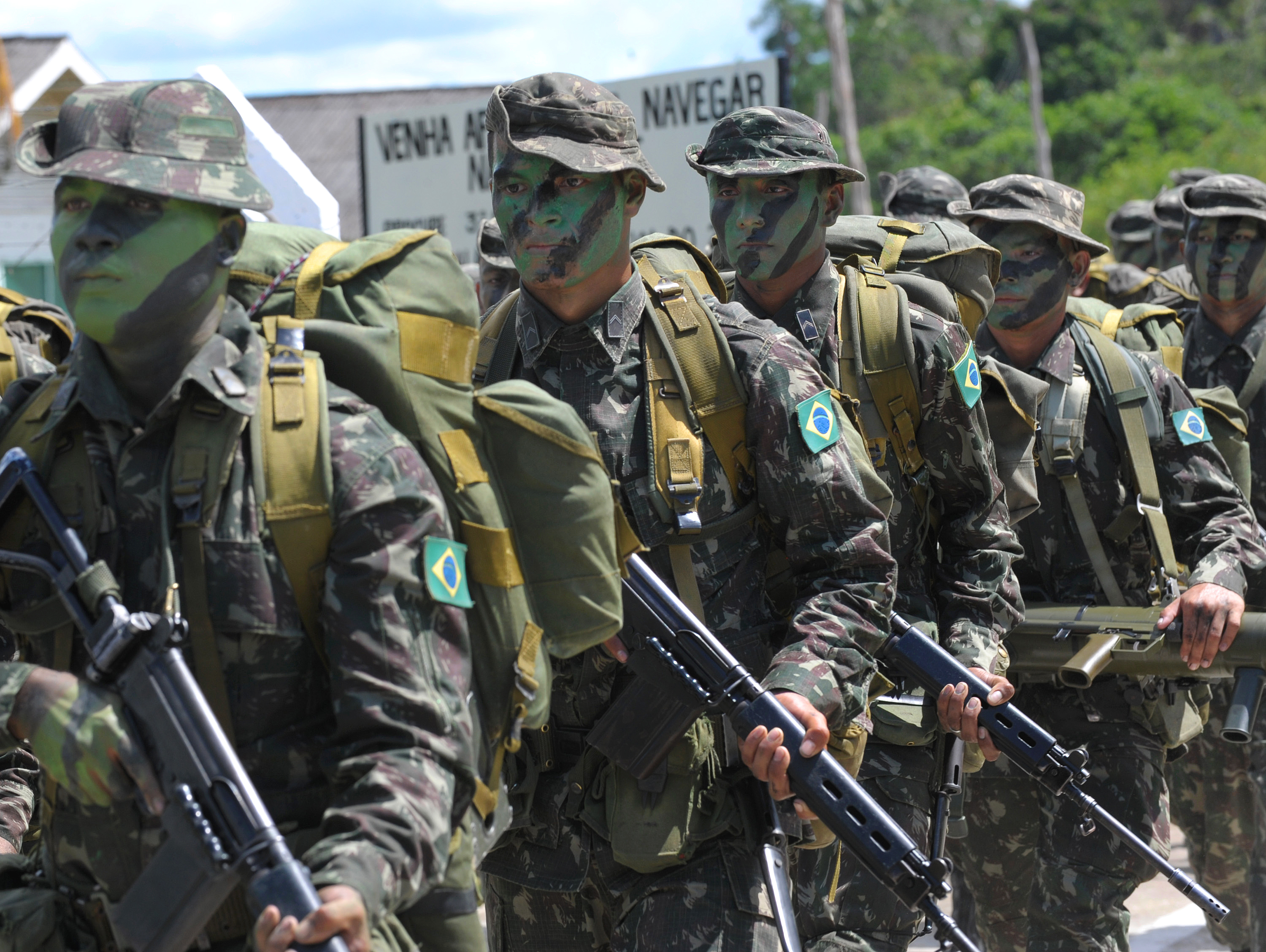
Brazilian Army soldiers of the Special Border Platoon, specialized, in jungle warfare

Amazon Military Command (Comando Militar da Amazônia), in Manaus

- HQ Company Amazon Military Command (Companhia de Comando do Comando Militar da Amazônia), in Manaus
- 1st Jungle Signals and Electronic Warfare Battalion (1º Batalhão de Comunicações e Guerra Eletrônica de Selvaa), in Manaus
- 4th Army Aviation Battalion (4º Batalhão de Aviação do Exército), in Manaus
- 4th Military Intelligence Battalion (4º Batalhão de Inteligência Militar), in Manaus
- 7th Military Police Battalion (7º Batalhão de Polícia do Exército), in Manaus
- 3rd Special Forces Company (3ª Companhia de Forças Especiais), in Manaus
- Jungle Warfare Instruction Center (Centro de Instrução de Guerra na Selva), in Manaus
- 12th Military Region (12ª Região Militar), in Manaus
  - HQ Company 12th Military Region (Companhia de Comando da 12ª Região Militar), in Manaus
  - 12th Support Battalion (12º Batalhão de Suprimento), in Manaus
  - 12th Military Region Regional Maintenance Park (Parque Regional de Manutenção da 12ª Região Militar), in Manaus
  - Amazon Military Command Boat Center (Centro de Embarcações do Comando Militar da Amazônia), in Manaus
  - Manaus Military Area Hospital (Hospital Militar de Área de Manaus), in Manaus
  - Tabatinga Garrison Hospital (Hospital da Guarnição de Tabatinga), in Tabatinga
  - Porto Velho Garrison Hospital (Hospital da Guarnição de Porto Velho), in Porto Velho
  - São Gabriel da Cachoeira Garrison Hospital (Hospital da Guarnição de São Gabriel da Cachoeira), in São Gabriel da Cachoeira
  - Reservists Formation Center (Centro de Formação de Reservistas), in Manaus
- 1st Jungle Infantry Brigade (1ª Brigada de Infantaria de Selva), in Boa Vista
  - HQ Company 1st Jungle Infantry Brigade (Companhia de Comando da 1ª Brigada de Infantaria de Selva), in Boa Vista
  - 1st Jungle Infantry Battalion (Airmobile) (1º Batalhão de Infantaria de Selva (Aeromóvel)), in Manaus
  - Roraima Frontier Command/ 7th Jungle Infantry Battalion (Comando de Fronteira Roraima/ 7º Batalhão de Infantaria de Selva), in Boa Vista
    - 1st Special Frontier Platoon (1º Pelotão Especial de Fronteira), in Bonfim
    - 2nd Special Frontier Platoon (2º Pelotão Especial de Fronteira), in Normandia
    - 3rd Special Frontier Platoon (3º Pelotão Especial de Fronteira), in Pacaraima
    - 4th Special Frontier Platoon (4º Pelotão Especial de Fronteira), in Sucurucu
    - 5th Special Frontier Platoon (5º Pelotão Especial de Fronteira), in Auaris
    - 6th Special Frontier Platoon (6º Pelotão Especial de Fronteira), in Uiramutã
  - 18th Mechanized Cavalry Regiment (18º Regimento de Cavalaria Mecanizado), in Boa Vista
  - 10th Jungle Field Artillery Group (10º Grupo de Artilharia de Campanha de Selva), in Boa Vista
  - 1st Jungle Signals Platoon (1º Pelotão de Comunicações de Selva), in Boa Vista
  - 32nd Military Police Platoon (32º Pelotão de Polícia do Exército), in Boa Vista
  - 1st Jungle Logistics Battalion (1º Batalhão Logístico de Selva), in Boa Vista
- 2nd Jungle Infantry Brigade (2ª Brigada de Infantaria de Selva), in São Gabriel da Cachoeira
  - HQ Company 2nd Jungle Infantry Brigade (Companhia de Comando da 2ª Brigada de Infantaria de Selva), in São Gabriel da Cachoeira
  - 3rd Jungle Infantry Battalion (3º Batalhão de Infantaria de Selva), in Barcelos
  - Rio Negro Frontier Command/ 5th Jungle Infantry Battalion (Comando de Fronteira Rio Negro/ 5º Batalhão de Infantaria de Selva), in São Gabriel da Cachoeira
    - 1st Special Frontier Platoon (1º Pelotão Especial de Fronteira), in Yauretê
    - 2nd Special Frontier Platoon (2º Pelotão Especial de Fronteira), in Querari
    - 3rd Special Frontier Platoon (3º Pelotão Especial de Fronteira), in São Joaquim
    - 4th Special Frontier Platoon (4º Pelotão Especial de Fronteira), in Cucuí
    - 5th Special Frontier Platoon (5º Pelotão Especial de Fronteira), in Maturacá
    - 6th Special Frontier Platoon (6º Pelotão Especial de Fronteira), in Pari-Cachoeira
    - 7th Special Frontier Platoon (7º Pelotão Especial de Fronteira), in Tunuí
  - 22nd Jungle Signals Platoon (22º Pelotão de Comunicações de Selva), in São Gabriel da Cachoeira
  - 2nd Military Police Platoon (2º Pelotão de Polícia do Exército), in São Gabriel da Cachoeira
  - 2nd Jungle Logistics Battalion (2º Batalhão Logístico de Selva), in São Gabriel da Cachoeira
- 16th Jungle Infantry Brigade (16ª Brigada de Infantaria de Selva), in Tefé
  - HQ Company 16th Jungle Infantry Brigade (Companhia de Comando da 16ª Brigada de Infantaria de Selva), in Tefé
  - Solimões Frontier Command/ 8th Jungle Infantry Battalion (Comando de Fronteira Solimões/ 8º Batalhão de Infantaria de Selva), in Tabatinga
    - 1st Special Frontier Platoon (1º Pelotão Especial de Fronteira), in Palmeira do Javari
    - 2nd Special Frontier Platoon (2º Pelotão Especial de Fronteira), at Ipiranga Airport
    - 4th Special Frontier Platoon (4º Pelotão Especial de Fronteira), in Estirão do Equador
  - Japurá Frontier Command/ 17th Jungle Infantry Battalion (Comando de Fronteira Japurá/ 17º Batalhão de Infantaria de Selva), in Tefé
    - 3rd Special Frontier Platoon (3º Pelotão Especial de Fronteira), in Vila Bittencourt
  - 16th Jungle Signals Platoon (16º Pelotão de Comunicações de Selva), in Tefé
  - 34th Military Police Platoon (34º Pelotão de Polícia do Exército), in Tefé
  - 16th Jungle Logistics Battalion (16º Batalhão Logístico de Selva), in Tefé
- 17th Jungle Infantry Brigade (17ª Brigada de Infantaria de Selva), in Porto Velho
  - HQ Company 17th Jungle Infantry Brigade (Companhia de Comando da 17ª Brigada de Infantaria de Selva), in Porto Velho
  - Acre Frontier Command/ 4th Jungle Infantry Battalion (Comando de Fronteira Acre/ 4º Batalhão de Infantaria de Selva), in Rio Branco
    - Special Frontier Company (Companhia Especial de Fronteira), in Epitaciolândia
    - 2nd Special Frontier Platoon (2º Pelotão Especial de Fronteira), in Assis Brasil
    - 3rd Special Frontier Platoon (3º Pelotão Especial de Fronteira), in Plácido de Castro
    - 4th Special Frontier Platoon (4º Pelotão Especial de Fronteira), in Santa Rosa do Purus
  - Rondônia Frontier Command/ 6th Jungle Infantry Battalion (Comando de Fronteira Rondônia/ 6º Batalhão de Infantaria de Selva), in Guajará-Mirim
    - 1st Special Frontier Platoon (1º Pelotão Especial de Fronteira), in Príncipe da Beira
  - 54th Jungle Infantry Battalion (54º Batalhão de Infantaria de Selva), in Humaitá
  - Juruá Frontier Command/ 61st Jungle Infantry Battalion (Comando de Fronteira Juruá/ 61º Batalhão de Infantaria de Selva), in Cruzeiro do Sul
    - Special Frontier Detachment (Destacamento Especial de Fronteira), in Marechal Thaumaturgo
  - 17th Jungle Infantry Company (17ª Companhia de Infantaria de Selva), in Porto Velho
  - 17th Jungle Signals Platoon (17º Pelotão de Comunicações de Selva), in Porto Velho
  - 17th Military Police Platoon (17º Pelotão de Polícia do Exército), in Porto Velho
  - 17th Jungle Logistics Battalion (17º Batalhão Logístico de Selva), in Porto Velho
- 2nd Engineer Group (2º Grupamento de Engenharia), in Manaus
  - Command Company 2nd Engineer Group (Companhia de Comando do 2º Grupamento de Engenharia), in Manaus
  - 12th Military Region Regional Works Commission (Comissão Regional de Obras da 12ª Região Militar), in Manaus
  - 5th Construction Engineer Battalion (5º Batalhão de Engenharia de Construção), in Porto Velho
  - 6th Construction Engineer Battalion (6º Batalhão de Engenharia de Construção), in Boa Vista
  - 7th Construction Engineer Battalion (7º Batalhão de Engenharia de Construção), in Rio Branco
  - 8th Construction Engineer Battalion (8º Batalhão de Engenharia de Construção), in Santarém
  - 21st Construction Engineer Company (21ª Companhia de Engenharia de Construção), in São Gabriel da Cachoeira

=== Organization graphic ===
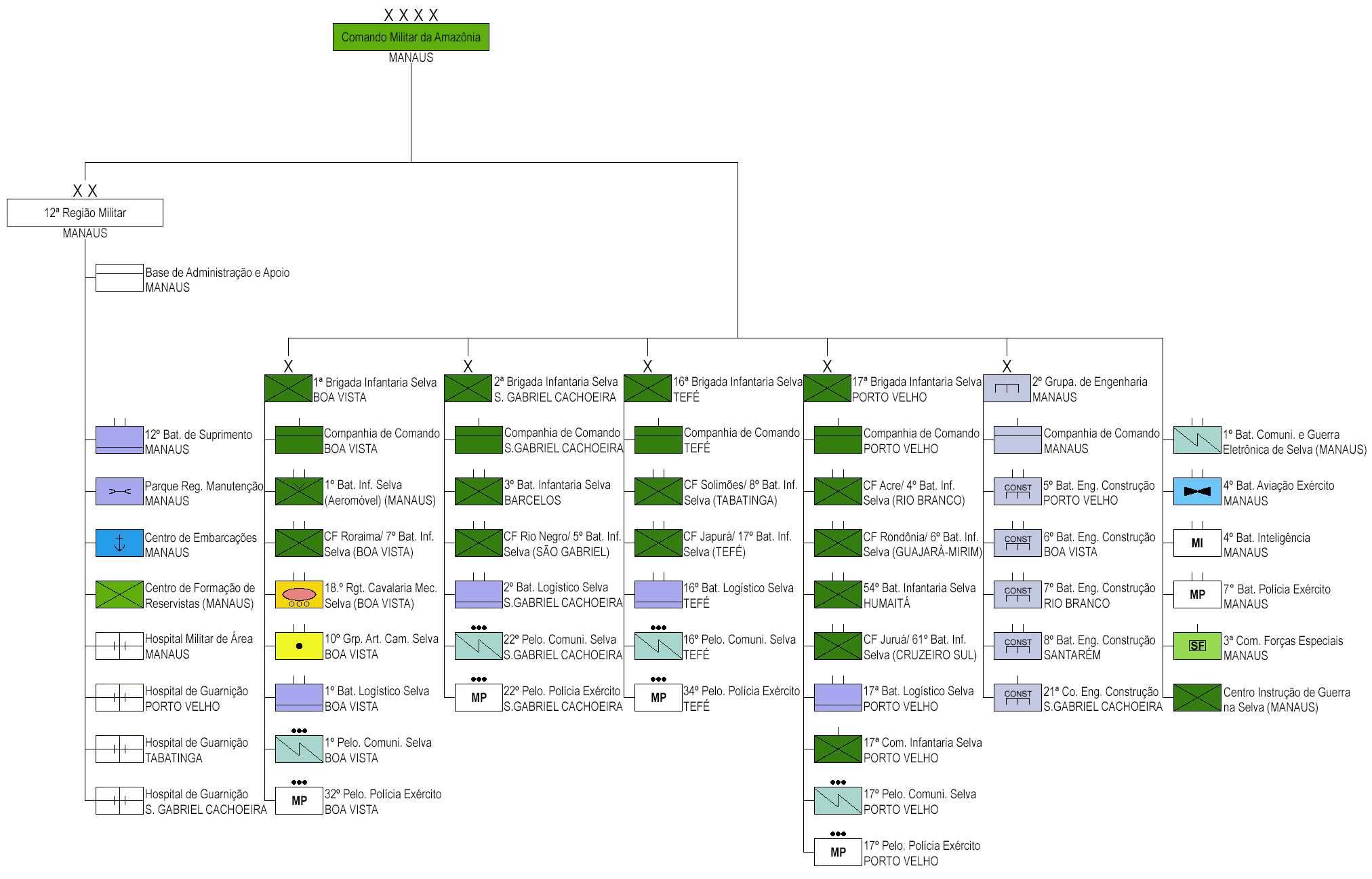
Amazon Military Command organization 2024 (click image to enlarge)
