= Alto Juruá Extractive Reserve =

- Reserva Extrativista do Alto Juruá
- IUCN category VI (protected area with sustainable use of natural resources)
- Location within Brazil
- Coordinates: 9.143°S 72.534°W
- Area: 537,946.47 ha (2,077.0229 sq mi)
- Designation: Extractive reserve
- Created: 23 January 1990
- Administrator: Chico Mendes Institute for Biodiversity Conservation

The Alto Juruá Extractive Reserve (Portuguese: Reserva Extrativista do Alto Juruá) is an extractive reserve in the state of Acre, Brazil. The reserve is in the Amazon rainforest. As of 2011 it had about 5,000 residents. The objective is to support traditional occupations including extraction of rubber and other forest resources, farming, hunting and fishing, while preserving the environment.

== Location ==
Conservation units in the west of Acre 8: Alto Juruá Extractive Reserve

The Alto Juruá Extractive Reserve has an area of 537,946.47 hectares (1,329,294.7 acres). It is mostly contained in the municipality of Marechal Thaumaturgo in the state of Acre. Small parts are in the surrounding municipalities of Jordão, Porto Walter and Tarauacá, also in Acre.

The reserve is bounded by the international border with Peru to the south. It adjoins the Serra do Divisor National Park on the northwest, and the Riozinho da Liberdade and Alto Tarauacá extractive reserves on the northeast. It also adjoins the Arara do Rio Amônia and Kampa do Rio Amônea indigenous territories on the west and the Jaminawa/Arara do Rio Bagé, Kaxinawa do Baixo Jordão, Kaxinawa do Rio Jordão and Kaxinawa/Ashaninka do Rio Breu indigenous territories to the east. The reserve would be included in the proposed Western Amazon Ecological Corridor.

== Environment ==
The terrain is hilly with slopes from 3% to 20%. The Juruá River flows north through the western part of the Alto Juruá Extractive Reserve.The Tejo River flows from the east through the reserve to join the Juruá upstream of the settlement of Marechal Thaumaturgo, which is on the left bank of the Juruá just outside the reserve. The reserve is drained by a network of streams feeding these two rivers.

The Alto Juruá Extractive Reserve is in the Amazon biome. December–February is the wettest period and June–August the driest and coolest. Average annual rainfall is 3,000 millimetres (120 in). Temperatures vary from 25 to 35 °C (77 to 95 °F) with an average of 30 °C (86 °F). Altitudes range from 250 to 300 metres (820 to 980 ft) above sea level.

Vegetation is mostly lowland forest and campina. There is dry land tropical forest with dense or open coverage, as well as periodically flooded alluvial forest. The forest has many species of palm trees and vines. 130 species of mammals have been recorded including 16 primate species, jaguar, puma, giant otter, tapir, deer and manatee. Reptiles include caimans and alligator. There 84 species of amphibians and 115 of fish. 527 species of birds have been identified including macaws, parrots, herons and the harpy eagle. Protected species include the Paititia neglecta butterfly.

== Human activities ==
Rubber extraction began around 1890, with most of the tappers having migrated from the north east of Brazil. The level of extraction fluctuated due to booms and busts in demand. After the decline in rubber demand in the 1980s farming has become more important. The main economic activities in the reserve are rubber production and family farming, but residents also engage in hunting, fishing, extraction of forest resources, canoe building and manufacture of cassava flour. Communities vary in size from three to one hundred houses. As of 2011 there were estimated to be about 5,000 inhabitants.

== History ==
The Alto Juruá Extractive Reserve was the first extractive reserve to be legally recognised in Brazil, and has its origins in the struggles of the labour movement in the Juruá Valley and the inclusion of environmentalism in the rubber tappers' cause. The reserve was created by presidential decree 98.863 of 23 January 1990. It is administered by the Chico Mendes Institute for Biodiversity Conservation (ICMBio). The reserve is classed as IUCN protected area category VI (protected area with sustainable use of natural resources). The basic objectives are to protect the livelihoods and culture of the traditional populations, and to ensure the sustainable use of natural resources. On 13 November 2003 INCRA recognised the reserve as an agro-extractive project for 567 families.

After the reserve was created and the usage plan was defined there was a loss of motivation. The reserve became the focus of political disputes, since half of the municipality's population is inside the reserve. Preparation of the management plan, which began in July 2009 with the support of the Norway Project, started to recover the motivation and reason for the extractive reserve. A credit committee was formed on 13 July 2010. The deliberative council was created on 21 July 2011. An inter-agency working group was established on 27 October 2015 to resolve the problem of intrusion of non-indigenous people into the Arara do Rio Amonia Indigenous Territory, which overlaps with the reserve.

== See also ==
- Matsés National Reserve

== Sources ==
- "A Reserva Extrativista", Vozes da Floresta (in Portuguese)
- Ayres, José Márcio; Da Fonseca, Gustavo A. B.; Rylands, Anthony B.; Queiroz, Helder L.; Pinto, Luiz Paulo; Masterson, Donald; Cavalcanti, Roberto B. (2005), Os Corredores Ecológicos das Florestas Tropicais do Brasil (PDF) (in Portuguese), Sociedade Civil Mamirauá, archived from the original (PDF) on 2016-07-31
- RESEX Alto Juruá (in Portuguese), ISA: Instituto Socioambiental
- Resex do Alto Juruá (in Portuguese), Chico Mendes Institute for Biodiversity Conservation, archived from the original on 2019-07-22
- Unidade de Conservação: Reserva Extrativista do Alto Juruá (in Portuguese), MMA: Ministério do Meio Ambiente
