= Môa River =

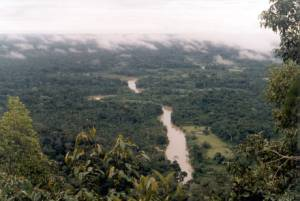
- Môa River in the Serra do Divisor National Park

- Location within Brazil
- Native name: Rio Môa (Portuguese)

Location
- Country: Brazil

Physical characteristics
- Source
  - location: Acre state
- Mouth
  - coordinates: 7.656255°S 72.678150°W

Basin features
- River system: Juruá River
- Tributaries
  - right: Azul River

The Môa River (Portuguese: Rio Môa) is a river of Acre state in western Brazil. It is a left-bank tributary of the Juruá River.

The Môa River flows through the northern part of the Serra do Divisor National Park, and forms part of its north eastern boundary. It continues east until it joins the Juruá River.

One of the Môa River tributaries is Azul.

== See also ==
- List of rivers of Acre
