= Brasiléia =

Municipality of Acre, Brazil

- Municipality
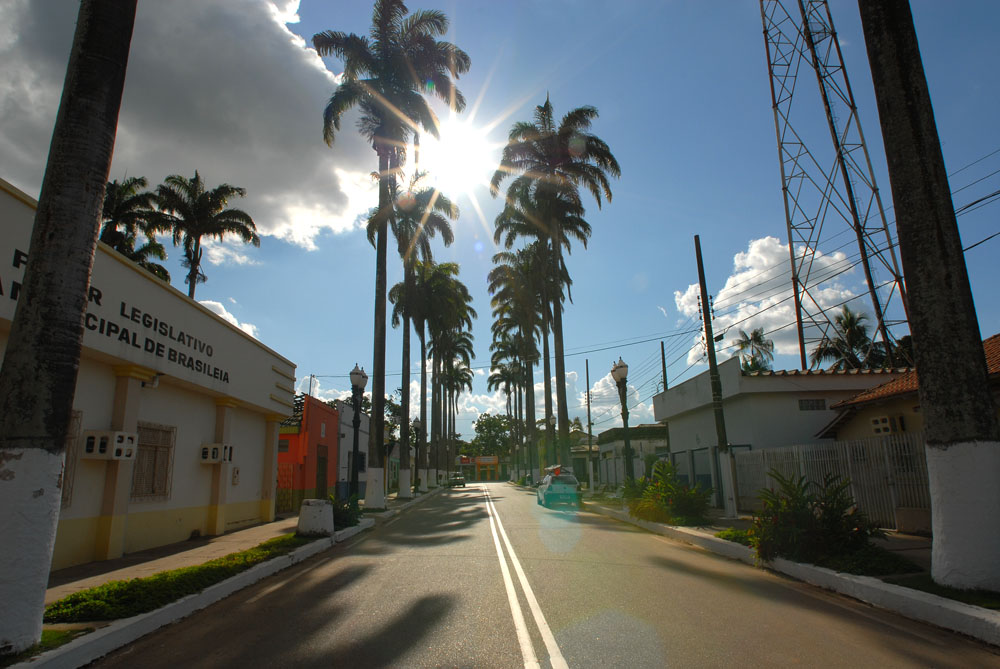
- Street in Brasiléia

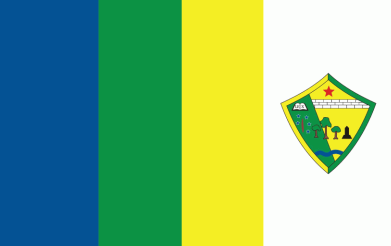
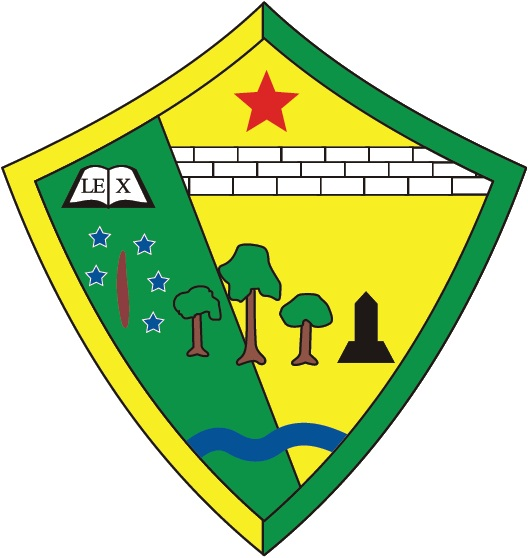
- Flag Coat of arms

- Location of Brasiléia municipality in Acre

- Location in Brazil
- Coordinates: 11°00′S 68°44′W
- Country: Brazil
- State: Acre

Government
  - Mayor: Carlinhos do Pelado (Progressistas)

Area
  - Total: 3,916 km^{2} (1,512 sq mi)

Population (2020 est)
  - Total: 26,702
- Time zone: UTC−5 (ACT)

Brasiléia (Brazilian Portuguese pronunciation: [bɾaziˈlɛjɐ]) is a Brazilian municipality located in the northern state of Acre. Its population in 2020 was estimated at 26,702 inhabitants. Its area is 336,189 km^{2}. Located 237 km south of Rio Branco on the border with Bolivia, Brasiléia borders the municipalities Epitaciolândia, Assis Brasil, Sena Madureira and Xapuri.

Although established as a free trade area, it is still not regulated. Currently, it depends on trade with the neighboring municipality of Cobija, contrary to what happened in decades past, when the reverse was the case.

== History ==
Brasiléia originated from a small strip of land from an old rubber plantation called Carmen, on July 3, 1910, using the name of Brasilia. In 1943 the town's name was changed since it had the same name as the new federal capital. The current name is derived from a portmanteau of Brazil and hiléia (forest). In 1992 the town divided its area, with the entire area and population located on the right bank of the Rio Acre originating the city of Epitaciolândia.

== Geography ==
The Xapuri and Acre rivers cross the municipality's territory, with the Xapuri river marking the border with the Republic of Bolivia. In the early decades of the twentieth century the region experienced the boom of Brazilian nuts and rubber extraction, which were transported on the river Acre on cargo ships known as "chata". Today goods are transported on the fully paved highway BR-317 linking with the state capital, Rio Branco.

The municipality contains part of the 931,537-hectare (2,301,880-acre) Chico Mendes Extractive Reserve, a sustainable use environmental unit created in 1990.

== Population ==
The county ranks sixth in the Acre state population, with 20,237 inhabitants at the rate of 64.22% urban (12,243 inhabitants) and 35.78% rural (6,822 inhabitants). Among the rural population 1,060 are denominated ribeirinhos, characterized as communities living along the river Acre.

== Economy ==
The city's economy has suffered a great loss, due to the lack of supervision and low prices in Bolivia compared with those of Brazil. Not only are consumers turning to the Bolivian economy, but entrepreneurs are as well due to the free trade zone of Cobija (the capital of Pando Department and Nicolás Suárez Province). Every day, new shops and businesses are built by Brazilians living in the neighboring towns of Epitaciolândia and even those who reside in Rio Branco, are investing in counties within Bolivia. The unprotected border of both countries is also affected by the trafficking of drugs, weapons, fuel and goods. Economic activities are virtually paralyzed, agriculture is traditional, industry gives signs of slow recovery, with the installation of a milk processing facility, which will supply the markets of Epitaciolândia and Cobija (Bolivia). Some sawmills and furniture factories, in the service sector, are completely paralyzed. Cattle ranching has a considerable workforce, especially for beef cattle. There is great potential for ecotourism, but it lacks exposure and investment. Currently the city of Brasileia does not have an infrastructure of hotels and restaurants able to cater to the influx of tourists who shop in the zone of Cobija, especially on weekends.

== Notable people ==
- Maria Antônia, Brazilian politician
- Wilson Pinheiro, Brazilian activist, president of the Brasiléia Rural Workers Union
- Wildy Viana, Brazilian politician, mayor of Rio Branco
