= Cruzeiro do Sul, Acre =

Municipality of Acre, Brazil

Cruzeiro do Sul
- Municipality
- Municipality of Cruzeiro do Sul
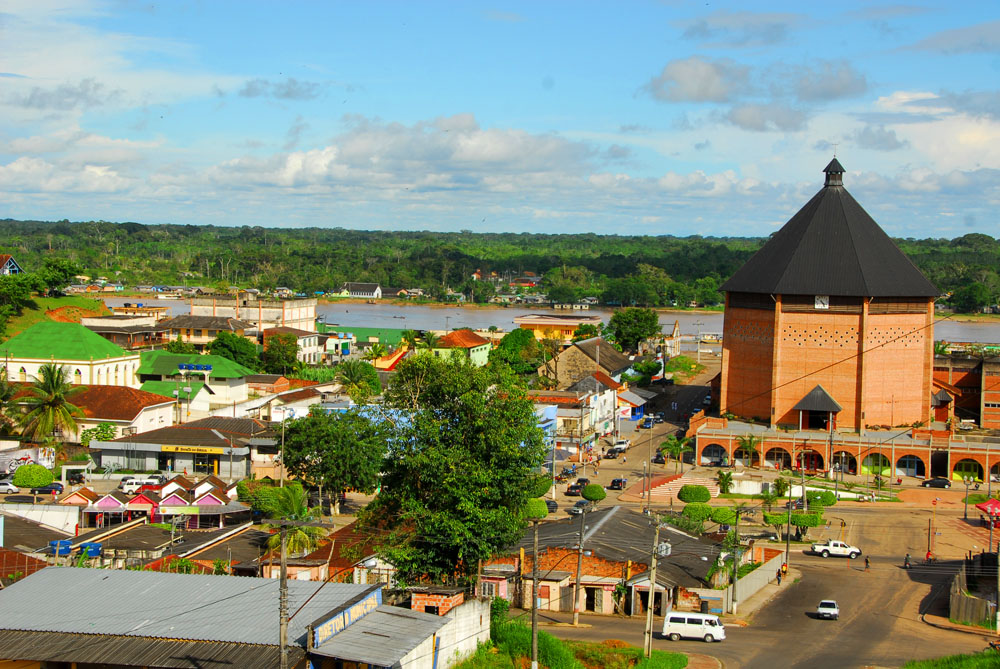
- City centre, Catedral Nossa Senhora da Glória, alongside Juruá River, Acre, Brazil.

- Flag Seal
- Nickname: Land of the Nahuas (Portuguese: Terra dos Nauas)
- Location in Acre

- Location in Brazil
- Coordinates: 7°37′51″S 72°40′12″W
- Country: Brazil
- Region: North
- State: Acre
- Founded: September 12, 1904

Government
  - Mayor: Ilderlei Cordeiro (MDB)

Area
  - Total: 7,924.943 km^{2} (3,059.838 sq mi)
- Elevation: 182 m (597 ft)

Population (2020 est)
  - Total: 89,072
  - Density: 8.94/km^{2} (23.2/sq mi)
- Demonym: cruzeirense
- Time zone: UTC−5 (ACT)
- CEP postal code: 69980-000
- Area code: +55 68
- HDI (2010): 0.664 – medium
- Website: cruzeirodosul.ac.gov.br

Cruzeiro do Sul (Portuguese pronunciation: [kɾuˈzejɾu du ˈsuw], Southern Cross) is a municipality located on the Juruá river in the west of the Brazilian state of Acre. It is the second-largest city in Acre.

It is bordered to the north by the state of Amazonas, to the south by Peru, to the east by the municipality of Porto Walter, to the west by the municipality of Rodrigues Alves, to the northwest by the municipality of Tarauacá, and to the northwest by the municipality of Mâncio Lima.

The municipality contains 23% of the 846,633-hectare (2,092,080-acre) Serra do Divisor National Park, created in 1989.

Marshal Thaumaturgo de Azevedo was primarily responsible for the founding of Cruzeiro do Sul on September 28, 1904. He chose that date because it coincided with the enactment of the Law of the FreeWomb, an important milestone in the gradual abolition of slavery in Brazil.

Freemasonry played a significant role in the life of Marshal Gregório Thaumaturgo de Azevedo, particularly in his political and social activities in Acre. He was one of the founders of the Fraternidade Acreana Masonic Lodge, which was crucial to the Acrean autonomy movement and contributed to the region's development.

In addition to Marshal Thaumaturgo, other explorers were also instrumental in the region's development during the rubber boom:

Name	Contributions
Mâncio Lima	Explorer and politician who contributed to the occupation and development of the region.
William Chandless	Known for his expeditions in the Amazon, he helped map and explore areas of Acre.

== Economy and buildings ==
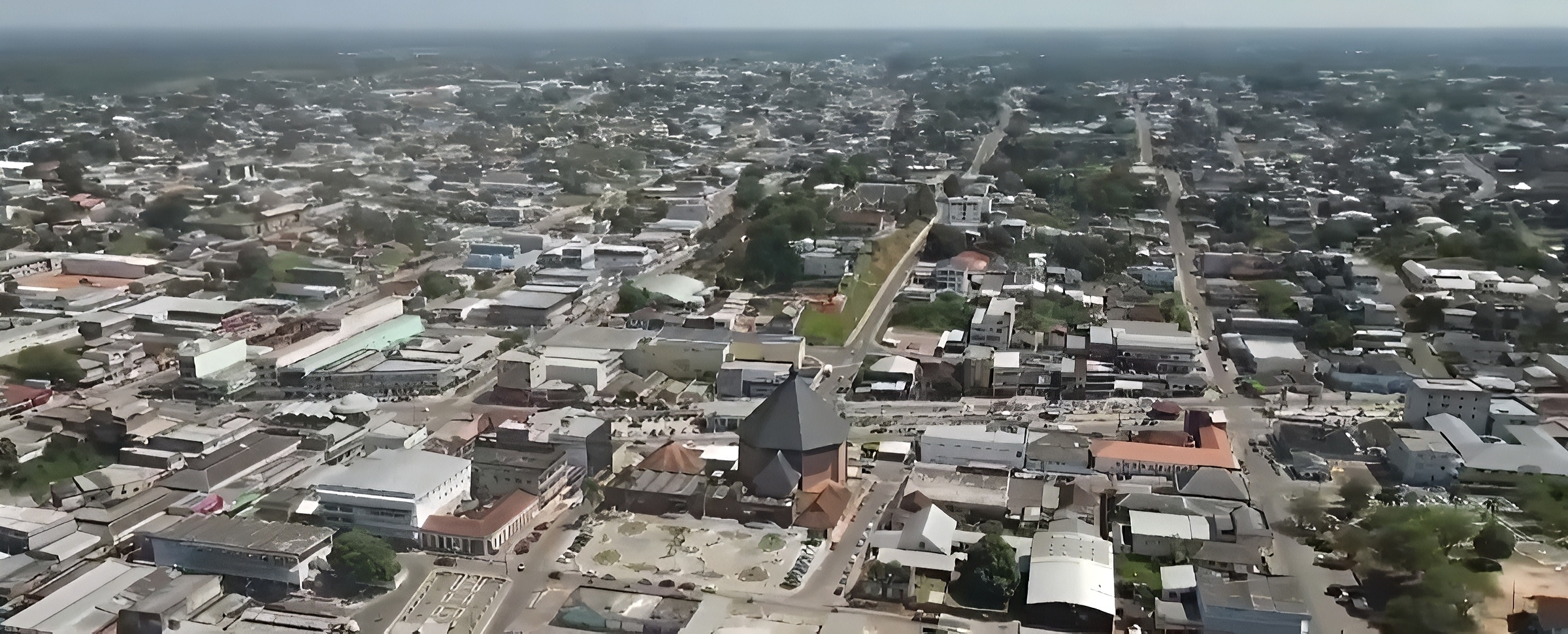
The city of Cruzeiro do Sul, Brazil

The principal economic activity of the municipality is rubber extraction and export, as it was in the majority of the state of Acre. This business attracted many immigrants in the 20th century, including Germans. Of lesser importance is the farming of the commodities of cassava, coffee, and rice. The city also operates as a regional trading center.

One of the city's most notable 20th-century structures is the Catedral Nossa Senhora da Glória. The parish was founded in 1915 by Spiritan priests, who established the first church in the Juruá valley. With more settlers, the territory was divided in 1930 and German priests were assigned to this area of the Upper Juruá.

Their influence was shown in the design of the current cathedral, which was begun in 1957; it opened in 1965. Its roof structure is said to be similar to a church in Cologne, Germany. The roof was constructed on site and raised by the workers. In 2015 the parish's centenary was celebrated with an exhibition of historic photographs and related lectures.

== Transport ==
The town is served by Cruzeiro do Sul International Airport. The town is about 630 kilometres from Rio Branco by road, through the BR-364.

== Geography ==
The urban area of Cruzeiro do Sun has a size of 24.794 square kilometres (9.573 sq mi).

=== Climate ===
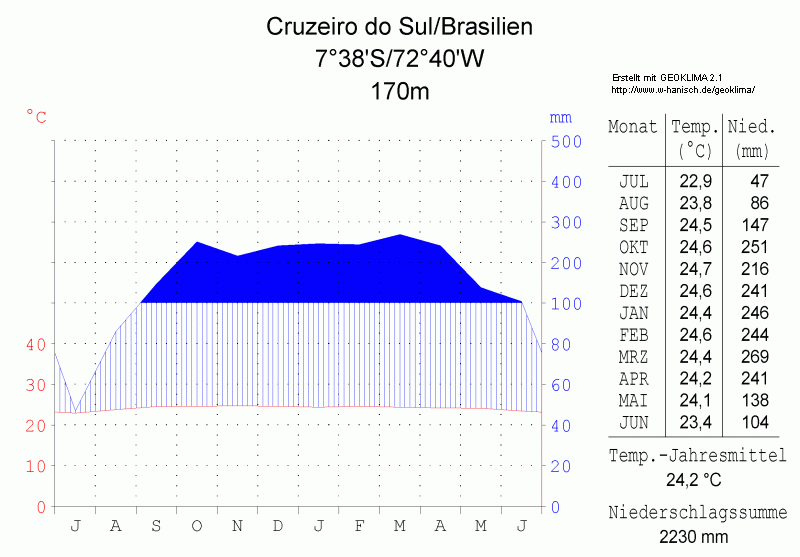

Although the town has a tropical climate typical of Acre and the Amazon region (Köppen Am, bordering on Af as July receives just under 60 millimetres (2.4 in) of rainfall) it is notable for sporadic cold spells not typically found in low-lying equatorial areas. The temperature has twice dropped below 2.4 °C (36.3 °F), once in May and once in November. The coldest temperature ever recorded is 2.2 °C (36.0 °F) and the warmest is 43.3 °C (109.9 °F). The warmest month by average temperature is October at 26.0 °C (78.8 °F), while the warmest month by average high is September at 32.8 °C (91.0 °F). The coolest months by the average temperature are June and July at 24.8 °C (76.6 °F), while the coolest month by average low is July at 18.6 °C (65.5 °F). The average annual temperature is 25.6 °C (78.1 °F). The average high temperature is 31.8 °C (89.2 °F), and all months have an average high above 30 °C (86 °F). This, combined with the high humidity year-round, leads to sweltering days.

Cruzeiro do Sul receives 2,167.4 millimetres (85.33 in) on average annually and has a wet season that generally falls between October and April and a drier season from June to September. March, receiving 292.6 millimetres (11.52 in) of rainfall on average, is the wettest month, while July is the driest month, receiving only 59.1 millimetres (2.33 in) of rainfall. The wet season has 14-18 precipitation days on average, while the dry season has 6-8 precipitation days on average. March has the most precipitation days and July and August have the least. Humidity is high year round, but drops below 80% from July to September. Even for a rainforest location, sunshine is unusually low, with the city only receiving an average of 1337.5 hours of sunshine annually. This is even lower than places such as London. For comparison, Manaus receives 1,774.8 hours of sunshine despite being wetter. Sunshine is lowest from January to March, and it rises during the dry season. July is the sunniest month, receiving 182.3 hours of sunshine.

Climate data for Cruzeiro do Sul, Acre (1981–2010, extremes 1941–present)
Month	Jan	Feb	Mar	Apr	May	Jun	Jul	Aug	Sep	Oct	Nov	Dec	Year
Record high °C (°F)	36.6 (97.9)	36.8 (98.2)	39.0 (102.2)	38.5 (101.3)	39.9 (103.8)	38.0 (100.4)	37.2 (99.0)	43.3 (109.9)	42.7 (108.9)	38.7 (101.7)	37.8 (100.0)	38.8 (101.8)	43.3 (109.9)
Mean daily maximum °C (°F)	31.5 (88.7)	31.5 (88.7)	31.6 (88.9)	31.5 (88.7)	31.0 (87.8)	30.9 (87.6)	31.5 (88.7)	32.5 (90.5)	32.8 (91.0)	32.7 (90.9)	32.0 (89.6)	31.6 (88.9)	31.8 (89.2)
Daily mean °C (°F)	25.9 (78.6)	25.7 (78.3)	25.7 (78.3)	25.7 (78.3)	25.1 (77.2)	24.8 (76.6)	24.8 (76.6)	25.5 (77.9)	25.8 (78.4)	26.0 (78.8)	25.8 (78.4)	25.8 (78.4)	25.6 (78.1)
Mean daily minimum °C (°F)	21.3 (70.3)	21.2 (70.2)	21.3 (70.3)	21.1 (70.0)	20.3 (68.5)	19.3 (66.7)	18.6 (65.5)	19.2 (66.6)	20.0 (68.0)	20.9 (69.6)	21.0 (69.8)	21.2 (70.2)	20.5 (68.9)
Record low °C (°F)	10.7 (51.3)	10.1 (50.2)	9.8 (49.6)	11.3 (52.3)	2.3 (36.1)	6.2 (43.2)	7.1 (44.8)	6.9 (44.4)	6.8 (44.2)	8.1 (46.6)	2.2 (36.0)	10.3 (50.5)	2.2 (36.0)
Average precipitation mm (inches)	247.0 (9.72)	258.3 (10.17)	292.6 (11.52)	232.8 (9.17)	155.6 (6.13)	89.7 (3.53)	59.1 (2.33)	76.4 (3.01)	113.2 (4.46)	191.0 (7.52)	222.2 (8.75)	229.5 (9.04)	2,167.4 (85.33)
Average precipitation days (≥ 1.0 mm)	17	17	18	15	12	7	6	6	8	13	15	17	151
Average relative humidity (%)	84.0	84.2	85.1	84.5	83.2	82.6	78.6	77.9	77.8	81.7	83.7	83.9	82.3
Mean monthly sunshine hours	82.4	62.1	74.0	88.6	120.1	117.5	182.3	162.3	133.1	127.9	103.0	84.2	1,337.5
Source 1: Instituto Nacional de Meteorologia
Source 2: Meteo Climat (record highs and lows)

== Gallery ==
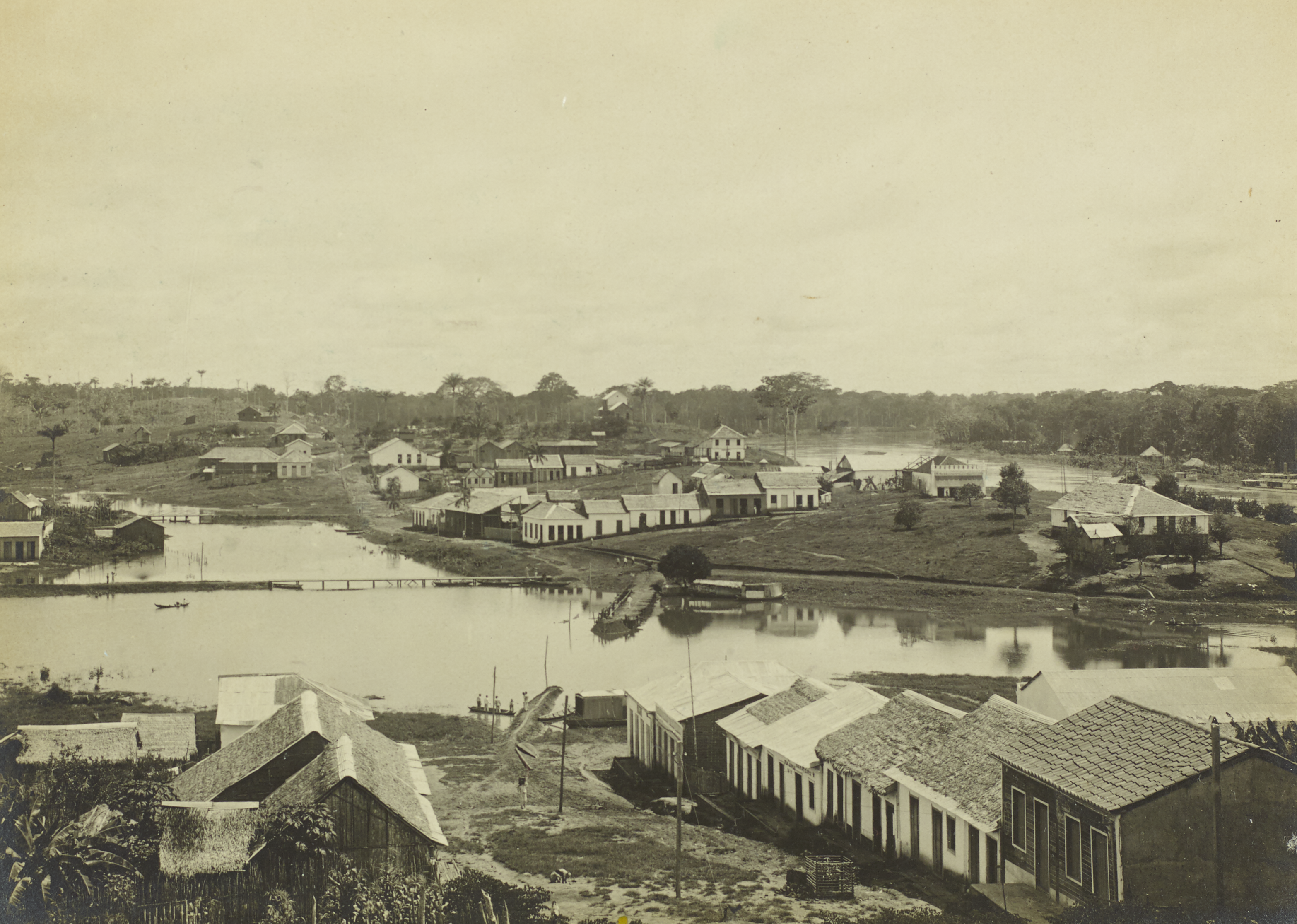
Cruzeiro do Sul in 1906

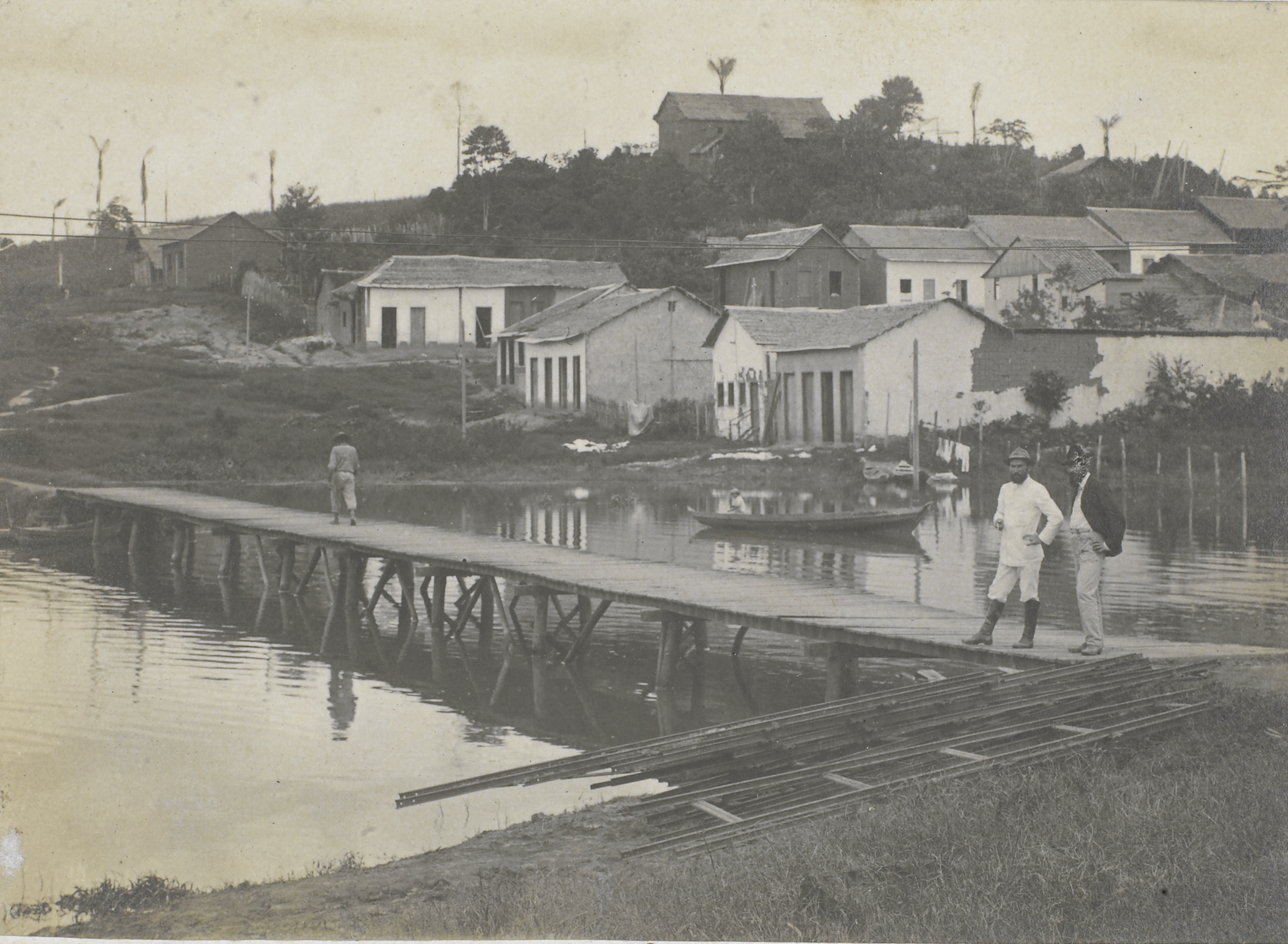
Cruzeiro do Sul in 1909

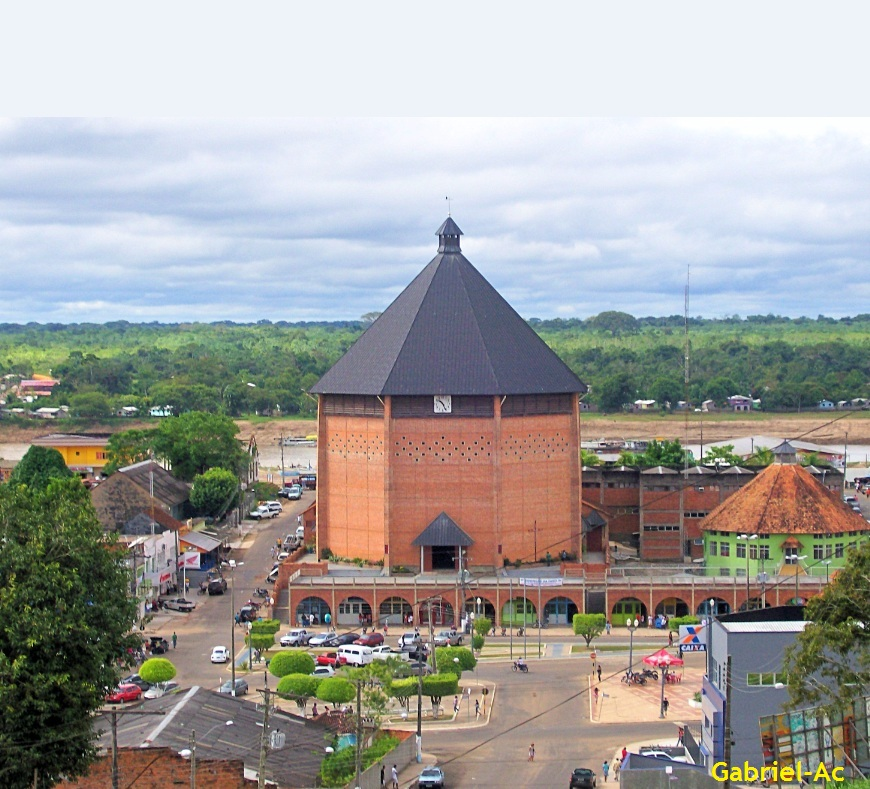
Catedral de Nossa Senhora da Glória, Brazil

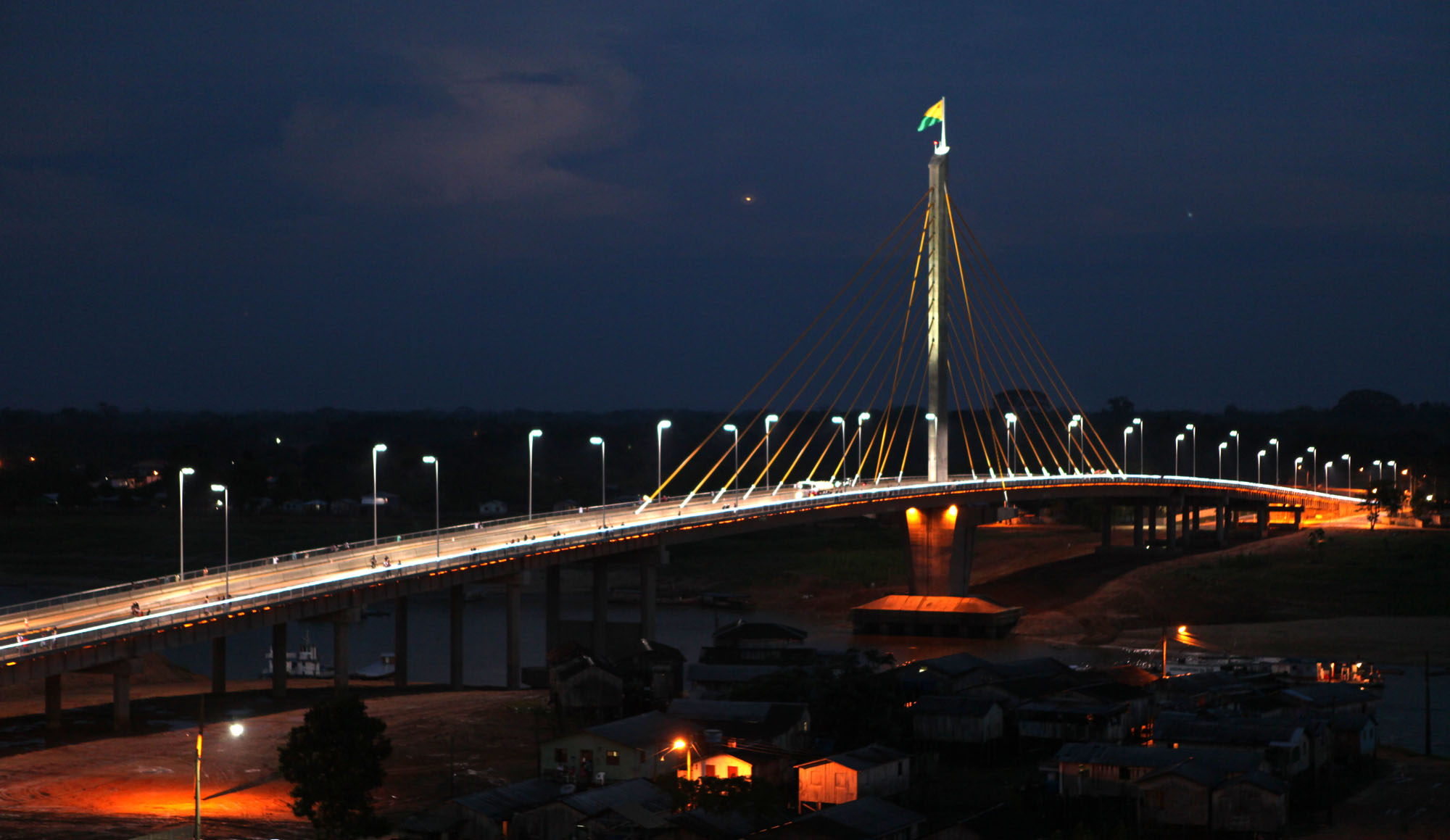
Union Bridge (Portuguese: Ponte da União) in Cruzeiro do Sul runs to the state capital Rio Branco, through the BR-364, Brazil

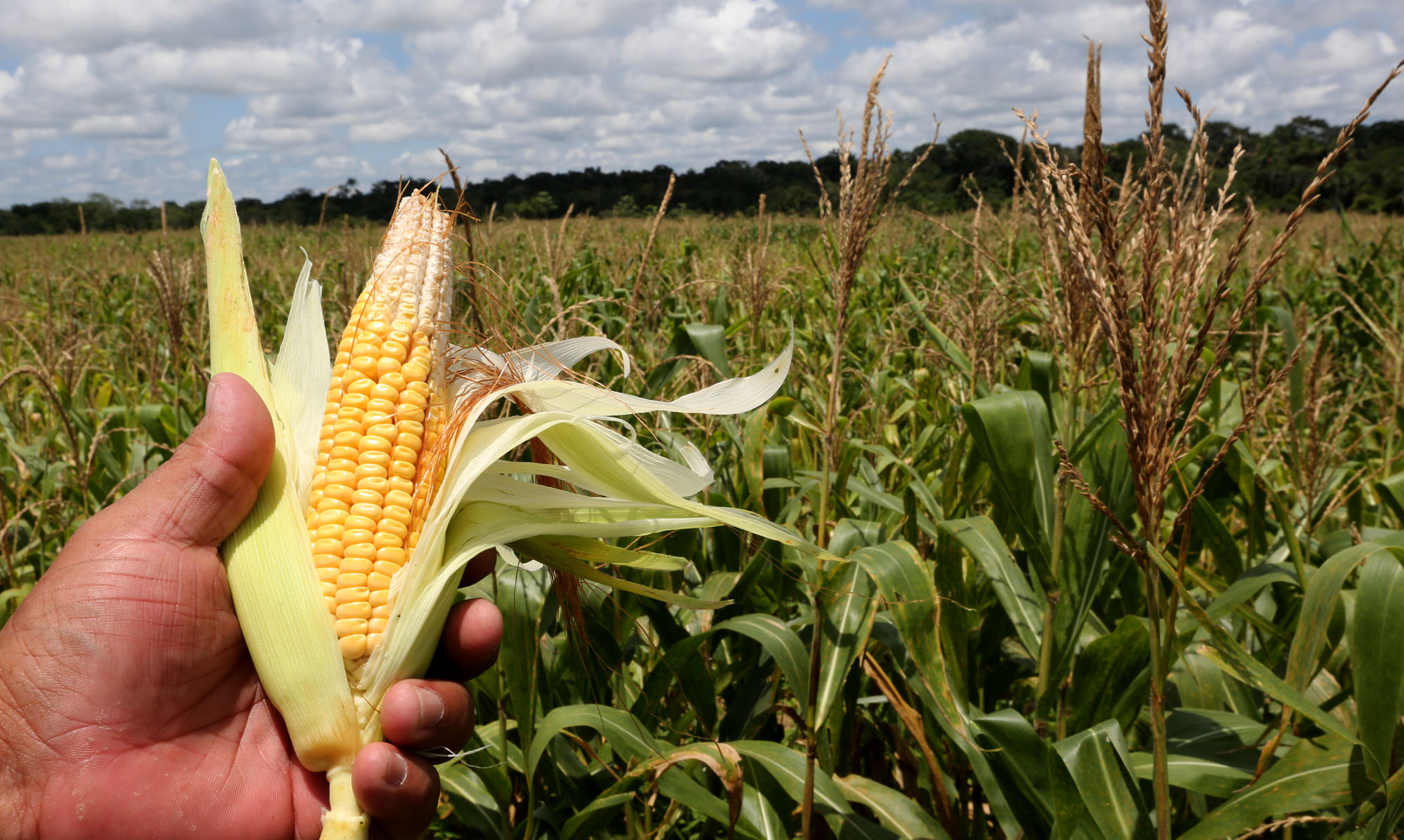
Maize and coconut plantations are common in and around Cruzeiro do Sul.

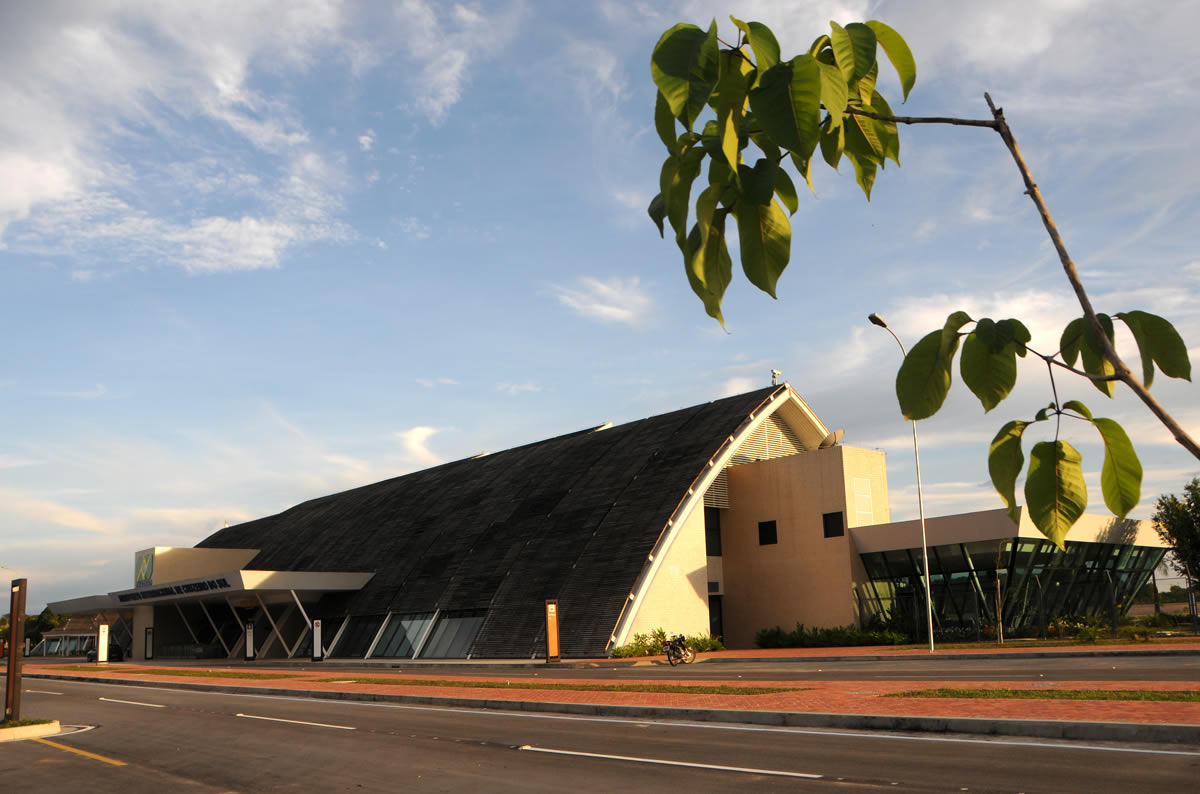
Cruzeiro do Sul International Airport, Brazil

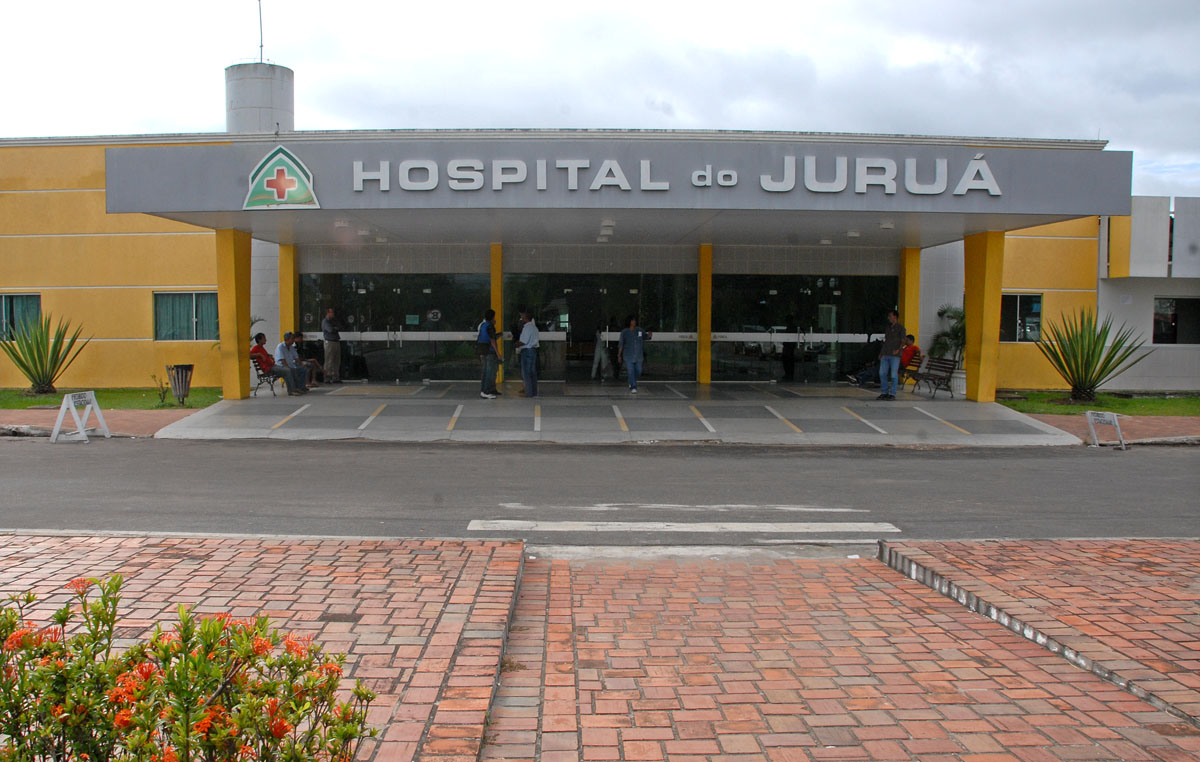
Juruá Hospital

Prefeitos de Cruzeiro do Sul
Office	Took office	Name	Notes
Departmental Prefect	7 September 1904	Marechal Gregório Thaumaturgo de Azevedo	
Departmental Prefect	1 October 1906	Dr. João Virgulino de Alencar	
Departmental Prefect	14 July 1907	Dr. Antônio Manuel Bueno de Andrada	
Departmental Prefect	9 May 1910	Cel. João Cordeiro	
Departmental Prefect	2 May 1911	Cel. Pedro Avelino	
Departmental Prefect	17 February 1912	Capitão Francisco Siqueira do Rego Barros	
Departmental Prefect	6 April 1916	Dr. Eleutério Frazão Muniz Varela	
Departmental Prefect	25 September 1916	Dr. José Augusto Carvalho Melo	
Departmental Prefect	11 April 1918	Dr. José Joaquim da Costa Pereira Braga	
Departmental Prefect	17 April 1920	Cel. Miguel Teixeira da Costa	Acting
Municipal Prefect	21 January 1921	Manuel Acrísio Xavier Bezerra	
Municipal Prefect	10 January 1923	Cel. Mâncio Agostinho Rodrigues Lima	
Municipal Prefect	30 July 1926	Cel. Miguel Teixeira da Costa	
Municipal Prefect	1 July 1927	Cel. Mâncio Agostinho Rodrigues Lima	
Municipal Prefect	13 November 1930	Pedro de Moraes	
Municipal Prefect	10 December 1931	Mâncio Agostinho Rodrigues Lima	
Municipal Prefect	28 September 1934	Mâncio Agostinho Rodrigues Lima	
Municipal Prefect	21 February 1936	Raimundo Augusto de Araújo	
Municipal Prefect	16 June 1939	Mário de Oliveira Lobão	
Municipal Prefect	14 August 1939	José Felipe da Costa Abreu	
Municipal Prefect	25 October 1941	Mário de Oliveira Lobão	
Municipal Prefect	5 November 1943	Silvestre Gomes Coelho	
Municipal Prefect	4 August 1945	Raimundo Mendes de Brito Arraes	
Municipal Prefect	26 November 1945	Dr. Abel Pinheiro Maciel Filho	
Municipal Prefect	23 May 1946	Alfredo Pereira Sales	
Municipal Prefect	26 January 1948	José Jeferson de Andrade	
Municipal Prefect	11 May 1949	Osvaldo d'Albuquerque Lima	
Municipal Prefect	3 December 1949	Antônio Miguel Nicolau	
Municipal Prefect	28 June 1950	José Klermann de Mesquita Meira	
Municipal Prefect	27 December 1951	Ten. Tancredo Maia	
Municipal Prefect	15 September 1953	Joaquim Lopes da Cruz	
Municipal Prefect	11 June 1956	Fernando Peres Nobre	
Municipal Prefect	10 June 1961	Ten. Francisco Aluizio de Queiroz	
Municipal Prefect	28 July 1962	Osvaldo d'Albuquerque Lima	
Municipal Prefect	17 October 1962	Francisco do Vale Vieira	
Municipal Prefect	12 October 1963	Maurício Peres Nobre	
Municipal Prefect	31 January 1967	Moacir de Souza Rodrigues	
Municipal Prefect	27 May 1971	Francisco Maciel Cardoso	President of the Municipal Council
Municipal Prefect	27 August 1971	Pedro Ranzi	
Municipal Prefect	19 September 1972	Francisco Maciel Cardoso	
Municipal Prefect	1 April 1975	João Soares de Figueiredo	
Municipal Prefect	31 March 1980	João Soares de Figueiredo	
Municipal Prefect	1985	Pedro da Silva Negreiros	Provisional
Municipal Prefect	1 January 1986	João Barboza de Souza	
Municipal Prefect	1 January 1990	Pedro da Silva Negreiros	
Municipal Prefect	1 January 1993	Orleir Messias Cameli	
Municipal Prefect	1994–1995	João Barboza de Souza	
Municipal Prefect	1 January 1997	Aluízio Bezerra de Oliveira	
Municipal Prefect	1 January 2001	Carlos César Correia de Messias	
Municipal Prefect	1 January 2005	Maria Zila Frota Bezerra de Oliveira	
Municipal Prefect	1 January 2009	Vagner José Sales	
Municipal Prefect	1 January 2013	Vagner José Sales	
Municipal Prefect	1 January 2017	Ilderlei Cordeiro	
Municipal Prefect	18 August 2020	Clodoaldo Rodrigues	President of the Municipal Council
Municipal Prefect	1 January 2021	Zequinha Lima	
