= Maria Antônia =

Brazilian politician

Member of the Legislative Assembly of Acre
- Incumbent
- Assumed office 1 February 2011
- Constituency: Acre

State deputy
- Incumbent
- Assumed office 1 February 2023

Personal details
- Born: Maria Antônia Pinheiro Barbosa; December 6, 1969 (age 56) Brasileia, Acre, Brazil
- Spouse: Francisco Eranilson de Amorim
- Profession: Politician

Maria Antônia Pinheiro Barbosa (born 6 December 1969) is a Brazilian politician and historian. She served as a member of the Legislative Assembly of Acre since 2011.

== Life and career ==
Maria Antônia Pinheiro Barbosa was born on 6 December 1969 in Brasiléia, Acre. She later moved to Rodrigues Alves. She studied in universities around her house and later got a degree in History. She worked as a public servant and high school teacher in the state schools. She was married to Francisco Eranilson de Amorim, mayor of Rodrigues Alves

Antônia started her political career in the 2010 Brazilian general election. She ran for the Legislative Assembly of Acre as a candidate for the Party of the Republic. She was elected to her first term with 4,500 votes, taking office on 1 February 2011. In 2014, she switched to the Republican Party of Social Order and got re-elected for the second term in the 2014 Brazilian general election, receiving 6,561 votes. She was re-elected for a third term in the 2018 Brazilian general election with the total of 8,260 votes.
