= Miotto =

Miotto is an Italian surname. Notable people with the surname include:

- Geraldo Antônio Miotto (1955–2021), Brazilian general
- Simon Miotto (born 1959), Australian footballer
