= Araujo Jordão =

Brazilian footballer (born 1985)

Personal information
- Full name: Antonio Araujo Silva
- Date of birth: 26 August 1985 (age 41)
- Place of birth: Jordão, Brazil
- Position: Forward

Team information
- Current team: Rio Branco–AC

Senior career*
Years	Team	Apps	(Gls)
2007–2009	Juventus–AC		
2010–2011	Rio Branco–AC	13	(1)
2012	São Luiz		
2012–2013	Rio Branco–AC	11	(1)
2014	Goianésia		
2014	CRAC	11	(0)
2014	Vitória da Conquista		
2015	Treze		
2016	Atlético–PB		
2016	Galvez		
2016–	Rio Branco–AC	5	(1)
- * Club domestic league appearances and goals as of 23 January 2017

Antonio Araujo Silva (born August 26, 1985 in Jordão), known by his nickname Araujo Jordão, is a Brazilian footballer who plays for Rio Branco–AC as forward. He already played for national competitions such as Copa do Brasil, Campeonato Brasileiro Série C and Campeonato Brasileiro Série D.

== Career statistics ==
As of 23 January 2017

Club	Season	League			State League		Cup		Conmebol		Other		Total	
Club	Season	Division	Apps	Goals	Apps	Goals	Apps	Goals	Apps	Goals	Apps	Goals	Apps	Goals
Rio Branco–AC	2010	Série D	5	0	12	5	—		—		—		17	5
Rio Branco–AC	2011	Série D	8	1	17	7	1	1	—		—		26	9
Rio Branco–AC	Subtotal		13	1	29	12	1	1	—		—		43	14
São Luiz	2012	Gaúcho	—		6	0	—		—		—		6	0
Rio Branco–AC	2013	Série D	11	1	14	6	1	0	—		—		26	7
Goianésia	2014	Série D	—		16	1	2	0	—		—		18	1
CRAC	2014	Série C	11	0	—		—		—		—		11	0
Treze	2015	Série D	—		15	2	—		—		—		15	2
Galvez	2016	Acreano	—		6	1	3	0	—		—		9	1
Rio Branco–AC	2016	Série D	5	1	—		—		—		—		5	1
Career total			40	3	86	22	7	1	0	0	0	0	133	26
