= Matsés National Reserve =

Protected area in Peru

- IUCN category VI (protected area with sustainable use of natural resources)
- Location within Peru
- Interactive map of Matsés National Reserve
- Location: Peru; Requena Province
- Coordinates: 5°43′47.87″S 73°22′29.09″W
- Area: 4,206.35 km^{2} (1,624.08 mi^{2})
- Established: August 27, 2009
- Visitors: 30,000 visitors/year (in annual estimate)
- Governing body: SERNANP
- Website: Reserva Nacional de Lachay (in Spanish)

The Matsés National Reserve is a protected area of Peru located in the Loreto Region, Peruvian Amazon. It has an area of 420,635.34 has. (4,206.35 km^{2}).

The proposed establishment of the Matsés National Reserve is an initiative of the Matsés Native Community, which is located in the area adjacent to the Protected Natural Area, which constitutes one of the greatest strengths of the itself, given the commitment shown through their active participation in the process of preparing the establishment proposal.

The reserve will also support regional conservation, as it is part of a bi-national biological corridor with the Sierra del Divisor National Park in Peru and the Sierra del Divisor National Park and the Extractive reserves in Brazil - Alto Juruá Extractive Reserve and Alto Tarauacá Extractive Reserve.

== History ==
In the 1960s, during the first contacts between the Matsés and Westerners, the former attacked the surrounding populations with bows and arrows and kidnapped their women. The Government's response was the bombing of their villages and the forced displacement of the indigenous people towards the border with Brazil, where they were subsequently handed over the first territorial reserve in the history of Peru.

In 1994, the Matsés, with the support of the NGO CEDIA, asked the Ministry of Agriculture to form a communal reserve that would guarantee them access to the food that the forest and rivers provide them. The Peruvian Government did not establish the reservation or explain the reasons for rejecting the proposal.

In the first week of October 2007, three letters from PerúPetro addressed to the Matsé community, reported on the upcoming signing of concession contracts for the exploration and exploitation of hydrocarbons on land owned by the natives and in other areas that for 14 years they had been proposing as a communal reserve for its great biodiversity.

In December of that year, the community informed the entities involved of its decision to "not allow companies to enter if the State did not first respond to their request".

Thus, after bureaucratic procedures, on August 27, 2009, the establishment of the Matsés National Reserve was made official.

== Objectives ==
According to Supreme Decree No. 014-2009-MINAM, the objectives of the Matsés National Reserve are as follows:

=== General ===
- Contribute to the conservation of the existing natural resources in the interfluvium between the Gálvez, Tapiche and Blanco rivers in Loreto, allowing the Matsés population to continue with the traditional, permanent and sustainable use of them.

=== Specific ===
- Guarantee the constant reproduction of fish resources and the conservation of wild flora and fauna, protecting the headwaters of the Gálvez and Yaquerana rivers to ensure the permanent supply of food for the Matsés population.
- Ensure the participation of the Matsés Native Community in the conservation of their environment,

promoting the improvement of their living conditions and respecting their legitimate rights to sustainable use.

- value and protect the Matsés cultural heritage as well as the productive systems adapted to the ecological characteristics of the area and its surroundings.
- Support regional conservation by being part of a bi-national biological corridor with the Sierra del Divisor national park in Peru and the Serra do Divisor national park and the Alto Juruá and Alto Tarauacá Extractivist Reserves in Brazil.

== Location ==
The Matsés National Reserve is located in the Yaquerana District, Requena District and Soplin District, Requena Province, Department of Loreto.

== Climate ==
Hot and humid, with temperatures that usually exceed 34 °C. Like the entire Amazon, it has two well-defined seasons: the emptying season, the dry or summer season (from May to October) is known as the Amazon summer due to the formation of white sand river beaches and the other is the growing season. of rains (from November to April), known as the Amazon winter.

== Hydrography ==
The main rivers in the reserve are Gálvez and Yaquerana (Javary River basin) and Tapiche and Blanco (Ucayali River basin).

== Biome ==
The Matsés region is recognized as an area with rich biodiversity, for its great variety of fish and animals. In addition, it is a wooded area, due to its location and the humidity characteristics in the area.

=== Fauna ===
During the two weeks of the sampling for the rapid biological inventory carried out in the area in November 2004, by a team made up of The Field Museum of United States in conjunction with Peruvian organizations such as Universidad Nacional de la Amazonía Peruana, the NGO CIMA, the NGO CEDIA, among others, 177 fish species were registered, 10 new to Peru and eight could be new to science, although it is estimated that there may be more than 300.

The team registered 43 species of large mammals, estimating 65 for the region, highlighting those of large primates with high densities, as well as that of various threatened species that do not show hunting indications. It is estimated between 100 and 120 species of amphibians of which 74 were recorded including a toad (Dendrobates) Possibly new to science and a new genus of toad for Peru (Synapturanus). Likewise, it was estimated between 80 and 100 species, with a total of 35 registered species.

As for birds, a total of 416 species were registered, including two specialist species of white sand forests, of which one could be new to science. It is estimated that there are around 550 species of birds.

=== Flora ===
According to the rapid biological inventory, the forests are remarkably intact and appear to harbor a higher diversity of plants than in any other Peruvian reserve in low jungle. In these forests 1500 species of plants were registered, many new for Peru and science, although it is estimated that the species of flora amount to 4000. Likewise, large extensions of variables or white sand forests were found, very rare throughout the Continental Amazon and especially rare in Peru. White sand forests are characterized by the poverty of their soils and low diversity, but above all, by their very high levels of endemism.

== See also ==
- Tourism in Peru
