= Geraldo Antônio Miotto =

Brazilian Army senior officer (1955–2021)

General Geraldo Antônio Miotto
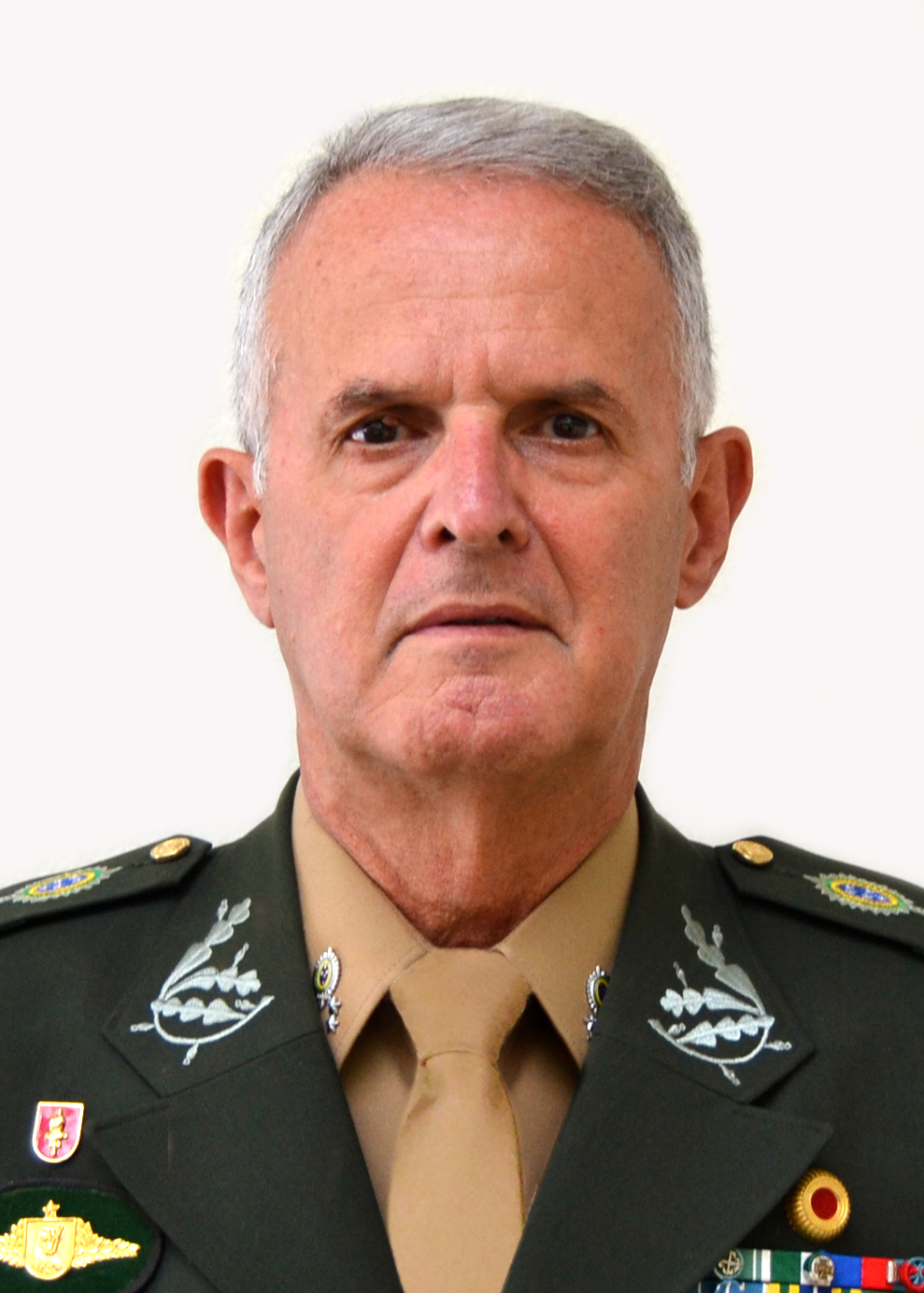

Commander of the Amazon Military Command
- In office 15 April 2016 – 16 March 2018
- Preceded by: Guilherme Cals Theophilo Gaspar de Oliveira
- Succeeded by: César Augusto Nardi de Souza

Commander of the Southern Military Command
- In office 26 April 2018 – 30 April 2020
- Preceded by: Edson Leal Pujol
- Succeeded by: Valério Stumpf Trindade

Personal details
- Born: 20 March 1955 São Marcos, Rio Grande do Sul, Brazil
- Died: 20 January 2021 (aged 65) Porto Alegre, Rio Grande do Sul, Brazil

Military service
- Allegiance: Brazil
- Branch/service: Brazilian Army
- Years of service: 1972–2021
- Rank: Army general
- Commands: Southern Military Command; Amazon Military Command; 3rd Army Division; 8th Motorized Infantry Brigade; Porto Alegre Reserve Officers Preparation Center; 16th Mechanized Cavalry Squadron

General Geraldo Antônio Miotto (20 March 1955 – 10 January 2021) was a senior officer of the Brazilian Army. As a member of the Army High Command, he was the Commander of the Amazon Military Command and Southern Military Command.

== Military career ==
Miotto joined the Army on 28 February 1972, at the Escola Preparatória de Cadetes do Exército, in Campinas. In 1975, he went to the Academia Militar das Agulhas Negras (AMAN) where, on 14 December 1978, he was declared aspirant of the Cavalry branch, being the first placed in his class. For this, he received the bronze Marshal Hermes Medal with a crown. Then, he was classified in the 3rd Squadron of the 1st Motorized Cavalry Regiment, in Passo Fundo.

He attended and completed the Basic Parachutist Course, the Jungle Operations Course, category “A”, the Communications Officer Course, the Intelligence Operations Internship at the National School of Information and the Intelligence Course at the Training and Improvement Center of Human Resources of the Brazilian Intelligence Agency.

=== Senior officer ===
Miotto attended the Escola de Aperfeiçoamento de Oficiais and the Escola de Comando e Estado-Maior do Exército, both in Rio de Janeiro. As a lieutenant colonel, he commanded the 16th Mechanized Cavalry Squadron in Passo Fundo. In Argentina, he took the Command and General Staff Course at the Escuela Superior de Guerra in Argentina, and after its conclusion in December 1997, he was appointed to exercise the function of Liaison Officer with the Command of the Military Institutes, of the Argentine Army, in Buenos Aires.

On 15 August 2000, Miotto was removed from office in Buenos Aires and appointed Commander of the Center for the Preparation of Officials of the Porto Alegre Reserve (CPOR). On 12 December 2001, he was promoted to the rank of colonel of cavalry. On 28 October 2003, being transferred from CPOR's command, he was assigned to attend the Higher Studies in Policy and Strategy Studies at the Escola Superior de Guerra in Rio de Janeiro. He was appointed officer of the Army Commander's Office on 1 July 2004, along with his colleague (also Colonel of Cavalry) Edson Leal Pujol.

=== General officer ===
Initially, on 31 July 2008, Miotto was promoted to the rank of Combatant Brigadier general being appointed Commander of the 8th Motorized Infantry Brigade, until on 19 March 2010 he was transferred to exercise the position of Military Assistant to the Command of the Escola Superior de Guerra. On 22 September 2010 he was appointed to the post of Chief of Staff of the Eastern Military Command, being transferred from the post of Military Assistant to the Command of the Superior School of War. On 22 March 2012, he was promoted to the rank of Divisional general.

On 23 November, Miotto was appointed Commander of the 3rd Army Division, which he held from January 2013 to February 2015. On 24 November 2014, he was appointed to the position of Director of Education for the Department of Personnel, Education, Health and Sports of the Ministry of Defense. On 14 April 2015, he was appointed to the position of Executive Secretary of the Institutional Security Office of the Presidency of the Republic. On 16 October, he was appointed to the post of Deputy Chief of the General Personnel Department, having been transferred from the post of Executive Secretary of the GSI.

Miotto reached the culmination of his career when he was promoted to the rank of army general on 31 March 2016. Also on that date, he was appointed to exercise the position of Military Commander of the Amazon, being transferred from the position of Deputy Chief of the General Department of the Personnel. During this period, he received the title of Citizen of Amazonas, granted by the Legislative Assembly of Amazonas. He was the head of Manaus' security during the Olympic Games of the same year. He stayed in Manaus between 15 April 2016 and 16 March 2018.

On 21 March 2018, he was appointed to the post of Military Commander of the South, being exonerated from the post of Military Commander of the Amazon and replacing former commander Gen Ex Edson Leal Pujol. He held this position between 26 April 2018 and 30 April 2020, when he was transferred to the reserve.

== Truckers' strike ==
During the Truckers' strike that took place in 2018 and before authorization by the Federal Executive for the use of force, Miotto adopted negotiation as the north and reinforced the importance of dialogue, as was said in an interview with the largest newspaper in the South of Brazil: "[...] we have federal troops stationed. The Army's mission is to solve the problem of logistics in the areas of health, safety and education. We have nothing against truck drivers" and "Our guideline is to negotiate until the end so that there is no confrontation with anyone." In the face of requests for intervention, he reaffirmed the legalistic character of the Brazilian Army. Miotto was the head of 54,000 men and, after the end of the strike, explained that rumors and fake news would be investigated. According to him, the “largest logistics operation in Latin America” had taken place.

== Death ==
Miotto died on 20 January 2021, in the midst of the COVID-19 pandemic in Brazil. Miotto was diagnosed with COVID-19 on 1 December 2020, and died at the Hospital de Clínicas de Porto Alegre (HCPA), after a long battle with the disease.
