= Alto Tarauacá Extractive Reserve =

- Reserva Extrativista do Alto Tarauacá
- IUCN category VI (protected area with sustainable use of natural resources)
- Location within Brazil
- Nearest city: Jordão, Acre
- Coordinates: 8.916117°S 71.973086°W
- Area: 150,923.24 ha (582.7179 sq mi)
- Designation: Extractive reserve
- Created: 8 November 2000
- Administrator: Chico Mendes Institute for Biodiversity Conservation

The Alto Tarauacá Extractive Reserve (Portuguese: Reserva Extrativista do Alto Tarauacá) is an extractive reserve in the state of Acre, Brazil.

== Location ==
Conservation units in the west of Acre 7: Alto Tarauacá Extractive Reserve

The Alto Tarauacá Extractive Reserve is divided between the municipalities of Tarauacá (37.63%), Marechal Thaumaturgo (4.64%) and Jordão (62.37%) in the state of Acre. It has an area of 150,923.24 hectares (372,939.4 acres). The Tarauacá River runs through the south of the reserve, then forms the eastern boundary of the north part of the reserve. The southwest of the reserve adjoins the Alto Juruá Extractive Reserve. The northwest of the reserve adjoins the Riozinho da Liberdade Extractive Reserve. The reserve would be included in the proposed Western Amazon Ecological Corridor.

Reserva Extrativista Alto Tarauacá

Climate chart (precipitation, max. and min. temperature)
J	F	M	A	M	J	J	A	S	O	N	D
363 24 22	271 24 20	363 23 21	235 24 21	146 22 21	111 23 21	43 24 20	51 26 21	123 27 20	225 27 20	296 24 21	283 23 21
- █ Average max. and min. temperatures in °C
- █ Precipitation totals in mm
Imperial conversion
J	F	M	A	M	J	J	A	S	O	N	D
14 75 72	11 75 68	14 73 70	9.3 75 70	5.7 72 70	4.4 73 70	1.7 75 68	2 79 70	4.8 81 68	8.9 81 68	12 75 70	11 73 70
- █ Average max. and min. temperatures in °F
- █ Precipitation totals in inches

== History ==
The Alto Tarauacá Extractive Reserve was created by decree on 8 November 2000 with an area of about 151,199.64 hectares (373,622.4 acres) to ensure sustainable exploitation and conservation of renewable natural resources traditionally used by extractive populations. The reserve is classed as IUCN protected area category VI (protected area with sustainable use of natural resources). An extractive reserve is an area used by traditional extractive populations whose livelihood is based on the extraction, subsistence agriculture and breeding small animals. Its basic objectives are to protect the livelihoods and culture of these populations, and to ensure the sustainable use of natural resources.

The Instituto Nacional de Colonização e Reforma Agrária (National Institute for Colonization and Agrarian Reform – INCRA) recognised the reserve on 3 November 2003 as meeting the agro-extraction needs of 170 families. This was corrected on 19 December 2006 to allow for 300 families. A working group to administer the reserve was created on 4 December 2006. The deliberative council was created on 14 December 2010. The reserve is administered by the Chico Mendes Institute for Biodiversity Conservation. It is supported by the Amazon Region Protected Areas Program. The reserve helps reduce illegal and predatory extraction of hardwood, especially cedar and mahogany.

== Economy ==
The nearest school is in the town of Jordão. About 30% of the population are illiterate. 25% of the population are aged between 7 and 14, but only 10% attend school. 90% of families use river or stream water, and only 10% use a well or spring. About 80% have no water filter in their home. Only 7% have an outhouse or latrine.

The main extracted products are rubber and nuts. Other forest products are extracted in smaller quantities. The residents grow beans, rice and cassava, and market their surplus. They raise ducks, chickens, pigs, sheep, goats, donkeys and horses. Transport is difficult, particularly in the dry season from June to September. Most tappers routinely hunt paca, pigs and pampas deer, and 90% of households consume fish from the streams and lakes.

== See also ==
- Matsés National Reserve

== Sources ==
- Ayres, José Márcio; Da Fonseca, Gustavo A. B.; Rylands, Anthony B.; Queiroz, Helder L.; Pinto, Luiz Paulo; Masterson, Donald; Cavalcanti, Roberto B. (2005), Os Corredores Ecológicos das Florestas Tropicais do Brasil (PDF) (in Portuguese), Sociedade Civil Mamirauá, archived from the original (PDF) on 2016-07-31
- Full list: PAs supported by ARPA, ARPA
- Resex Alto Tarauacá (in Portuguese), Chico Mendes Institute for Biodiversity Conservation
- RESEX do Alto Tarauacá (in Portuguese), ISA: Instituto Socioambiental
- Unidade de Conservação: Reserva Extrativista Alto Tarauacá (in Portuguese), MMA: Ministério do Meio Ambiente
