= Azul River (Acre) =

- Location within Brazil
- Native name: Rio Azul (Portuguese)

Location
- Country: Brazil

Physical characteristics
- Source
  - location: Acre state
- Mouth
  - coordinates: 7.421877°S 73.286823°W

Basin features
- River system: Môa River

Azul River is a river of Acre state in western Brazil. It is a tributary of the Môa River. The name is shared by multiple rivers, including one in Argentina and another that flows through southern Brazil's Paraná state and is a tributary of the Piquiri River.

The Azul River in Acre state defines the eastern boundary of the northern section of the Serra do Divisor National Park

== See also ==
- List of rivers of Acre
