= List of municipalities in Acre =

A map of Acre divided into municipalities

Acre is a state located in the west of the North Region of Brazil that is divided into 22 municipalities. According to the 2022 IBGE census, it is the third least populous state with a population of 830,018 inhabitants and the twelfth smallest in land area at 164,064,761 km^{2} (63,345,758 mi^{2}).

Each municipalities has its own seat, called a city, and may also be divided into smaller units called districts, whose seats are called towns. Municipalities enjoys political autonomy and are governed by an organic law; however, unlike the federal government and the states, they don't have a judicial branch, and are governed solely by a mayor and a city council, which constitute the executive and legislative branches, respectively.

The largest municipality by population is the state capital Rio Branco, with 364,756 residents, while the smallest is Santa Rosa do Purus, with 6,723 residents. The largest municipality by land area is Feijó, which spans 27,946.68 km^{2} (10,790.28 sq mi), and the smallest is Epitaciolândia, with 1,652.71 km^{2} (638.12 sq mi). The oldest municipality is the state capital Rio Branco, founded on December 28, 1882.

== Municipalities ==
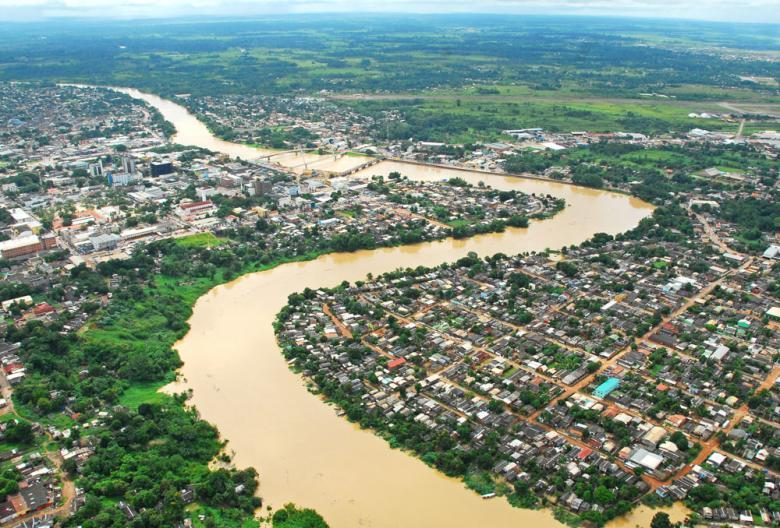
Rio Branco, the state capital and most populous municipality in Acre

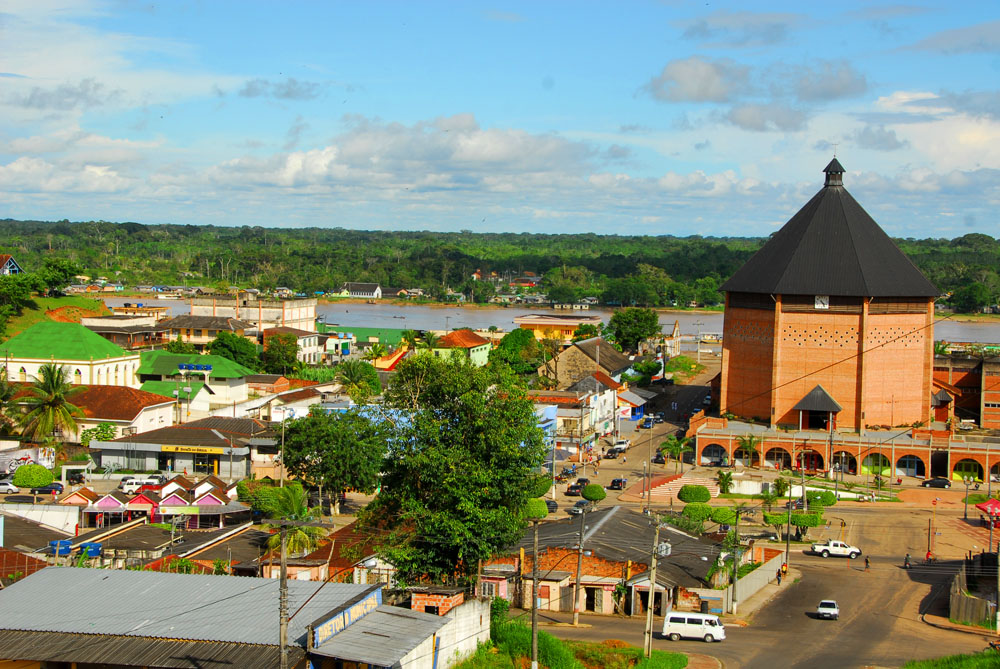
Cruzeiro do Sul, second largest municipality by population in Acre

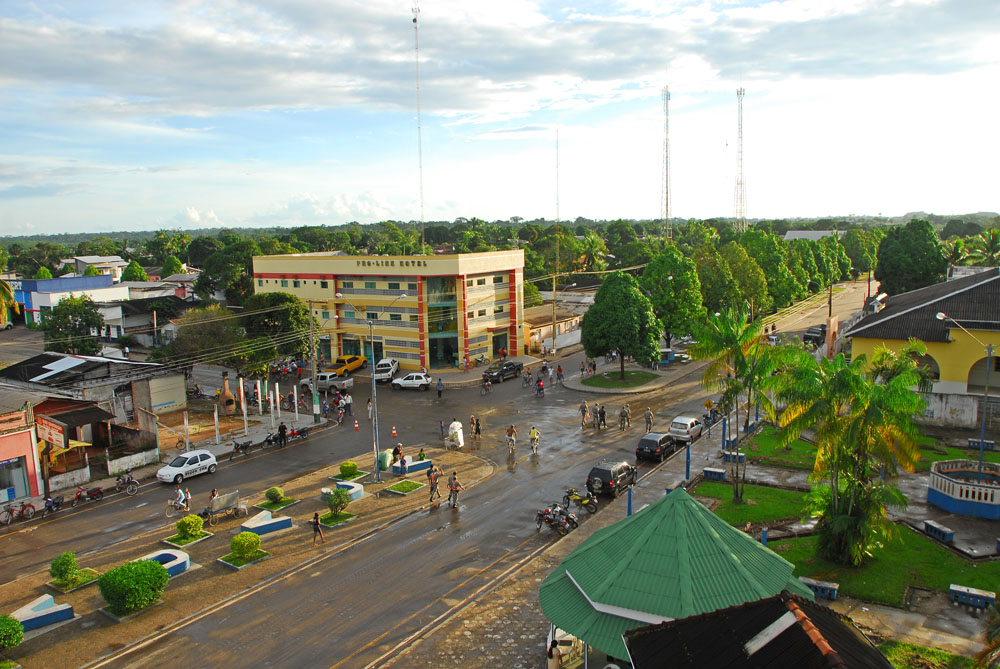
Tarauacá, the third most populous municipality in Acre

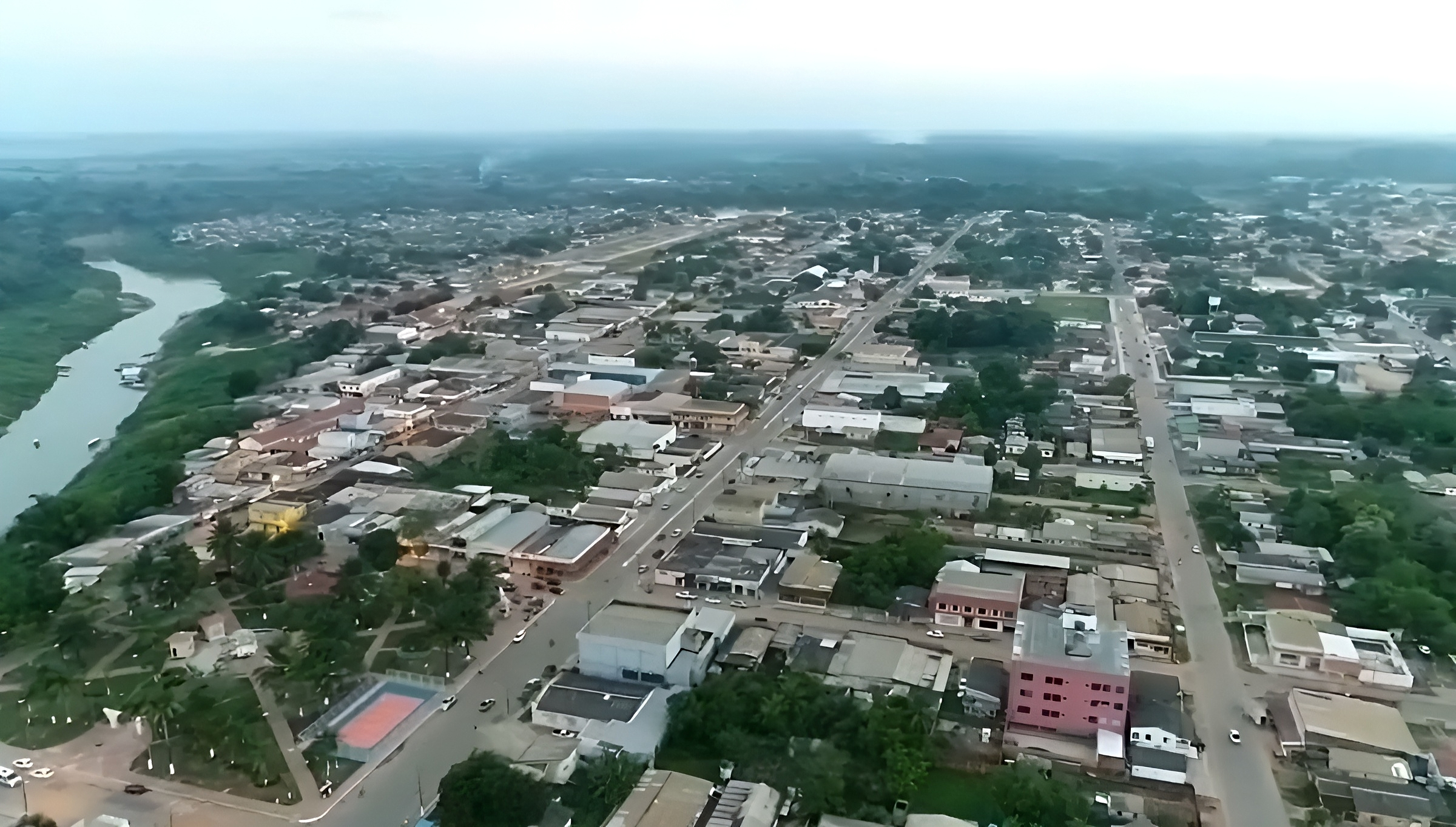
Sena Madureira is Acre's fourth most populous municipality.

† State capital

Municipalities in Acre
Name	Immediate region	Intermediate region	Population (2022 census)	Population (2010 census)	Population change	Land area (km²)	Population density (2022)
Acrelândia	Rio Branco	Rio Branco	14,021	12,538	+11.8%	1,811.612	7.8/km^{2}
Assis Brasil	Brasiléia	Rio Branco	8,100	6,072	+33.4%	4,968.527	1.6/km^{2}
Brasiléia	Brasiléia	Rio Branco	26,000	21,398	+21.5%	3,928.821	6.6/km^{2}
Bujari	Rio Branco	Rio Branco	12,917	8,471	+52.5%	3,035.547	4.3/km^{2}
Capixaba	Rio Branco	Rio Branco	10,392	8,798	+18.1%	1,705.236	6.1/km^{2}
Cruzeiro do Sul	Cruzeiro do Sul	Cruzeiro do Sul	91,888	78,507	+17.0%	8,793.341	10.5/km^{2}
Epitaciolândia	Brasiléia	Rio Branco	18,757	15,100	+24.2%	1,652.715	11.3/km^{2}
Feijó	Tarauacá	Cruzeiro do Sul	35,426	32,412	+9.3%	27,946.684	1.3/km^{2}
Jordão	Tarauacá	Cruzeiro do Sul	9,222	6,577	+40.2%	5,346.443	1.7/km^{2}
Mâncio Lima	Cruzeiro do Sul	Cruzeiro do Sul	19,294	15,206	+26.9%	5,414.073	3.5/km^{2}
Manoel Urbano	Sena Madureira	Rio Branco	11,996	7,981	+50.3%	10,634.5	1.1/km^{2}
Marechal Thaumaturgo	Cruzeiro do Sul	Cruzeiro do Sul	17,093	14,227	+20.1%	8,185.635	2.1/km^{2}
Plácido de Castro	Rio Branco	Rio Branco	16,560	17,209	−3.8%	1,952.531	8.5/km^{2}
Porto Acre	Rio Branco	Rio Branco	16,693	14,880	+12.2%	2,603.942	6.4/km^{2}
Porto Walter	Cruzeiro do Sul	Cruzeiro do Sul	10,735	9,176	+17.0%	6,452.756	1.7/km^{2}
Rio Branco†	Rio Branco	Rio Branco	364,756	336,038	+8.5%	8,834.832	41.3/km^{2}
Rodrigues Alves	Cruzeiro do Sul	Cruzeiro do Sul	14,938	14,389	+3.8%	3,082.396	4.9/km^{2}
Santa Rosa do Purus	Sena Madureira	Rio Branco	6,723	4,691	+43.3%	6,144.95	1.1/km^{2}
Sena Madureira	Sena Madureira	Rio Branco	41,343	38,029	+8.7%	23,748.843	1.7/km^{2}
Senador Guiomard	Rio Branco	Rio Branco	21,454	20,179	+6.3%	2,320.956	9.2/km^{2}
Tarauacá	Tarauacá	Cruzeiro do Sul	43,467	35,590	+22.1%	20,169.487	2.2/km^{2}
Xapuri	Brasiléia	Rio Branco	18,243	16,091	+13.4%	5,350.3	3.4/km^{2}
Acre	—	—	830,018	733,559	+13.15%	164,122.3	5.1/km^{2}
North Region	—	—	17,354,884	15,864,454	+9.39%	3,853,575.6	4.5/km^{2}
Brazil	—	—	203,080,756	190,755,799	+6.46%	8,502,728.3	23.9/km^{2}
