= Serra do Divisor National Park =

National park in Acre, Brazil

- Parque Nacional da Serra do Divisor
- IUCN category II (national park)
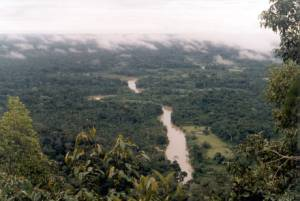
- Moa River in Serra do Divisor National Park

- Location within Brazil
- Location: Acre, Brazil
- Coordinates: 8°22′S 73°20′W
- Area: 8,463 km^{2} (3,268 mi^{2})
- Designation: National park
- Established: 1989
- Website: --

The Serra do Divisor National Park (Portuguese: Parque Nacional da Serra do Divisor) is a 8,463 km^{2} (3,268 mi^{2}) national park on the westernmost point of Brazil, in the state of Acre, near the Peruvian border. It also has the highest point in that state, reaching 609 meters above sea level. It has been nominated by the Brazilian government as a Tentative World Heritage Site since 1998.

== Location ==
Conservation units in the west of Acre.: 9. Serra do Divisor National Park

The Serra do Divisor National Park is divided between the municipalities of Rodrigues Alves (13.45%), Porto Walter (26.99%), Marechal Thaumaturgo (4.73%), Mâncio Lima (31.71%) and Cruzeiro do Sul (23.12%) in the state of Acre. It has an area of 846,633 hectares (2,092,080 acres). The park is bounded to the west by the border with Peru, which runs along the Serra Divisor mountain range. It adjoins the Alto Juruá Extractive Reserve along its southeast border. The Juruá River defines the eastern boundary of the southern section of the park. The Azul River defines the eastern boundary of the northern section. The conservation unit would be included in the proposed Western Amazon Ecological Corridor.

Main access is by boat, on the Moa or Jurua rivers, from the City of Cruzeiro do Sul. It has no tourism infrastructure.

== History ==
The Serra do Divisor National Park was created by decree 97.839 on 16 June 1989 to protect and preserve sample of ecosystems, ensure preservation of its natural resources, and allow controlled use by the public, education and scientific research. The consultative council was created on 5 July 2002. The management plan was approved on 24 December 2002. In 2013, Rainforest Trust launched a campaign to fund the establishment of another national park in the same area on the Peruvian side of the border. The conservation unit is supported by the Amazon Region Protected Areas Program.

== Environment ==
The park is in the Southwest Amazon moist forests ecoregion.

=== Climate ===
The climate is hot and humid tropical, with one to two month dry season. The average temperature in a year is over 24 °C (75 °F). Annual rainfall is 1,750 to 2,000 millimetres (69 to 79 in).

=== Terrain ===
Altitudes range from 200 to 600 metres (660 to 1,970 ft). Hilly and mountainous with large alluvial plains and some low tabular plateaus. Separating the two basins of Rio Ucayali (Peru) and Juruá (Brazil), the Park shelters main sources of Jurua 's left margin affluent. It is structured in four main hill massifs (Serras da Jaquirana, do Moa, do Jurua-Mirim & do Rio Branco), separated by flat plains and valleys of the corresponding affluent of the Juruá basin. Margins of the lower section of the Juruá and Moa rivers are regularly to permanently inundated, having many lakes, igapós and igarapés. Higher up, are found some tabular well-drained areas (250 m). Higher still, the landscape is mostly made of hills of up to 300 m with poorly marked valleys. The four sierras culminate up to 600 m, with asymmetric limestone crests dividing the basins.

=== Wildlife ===
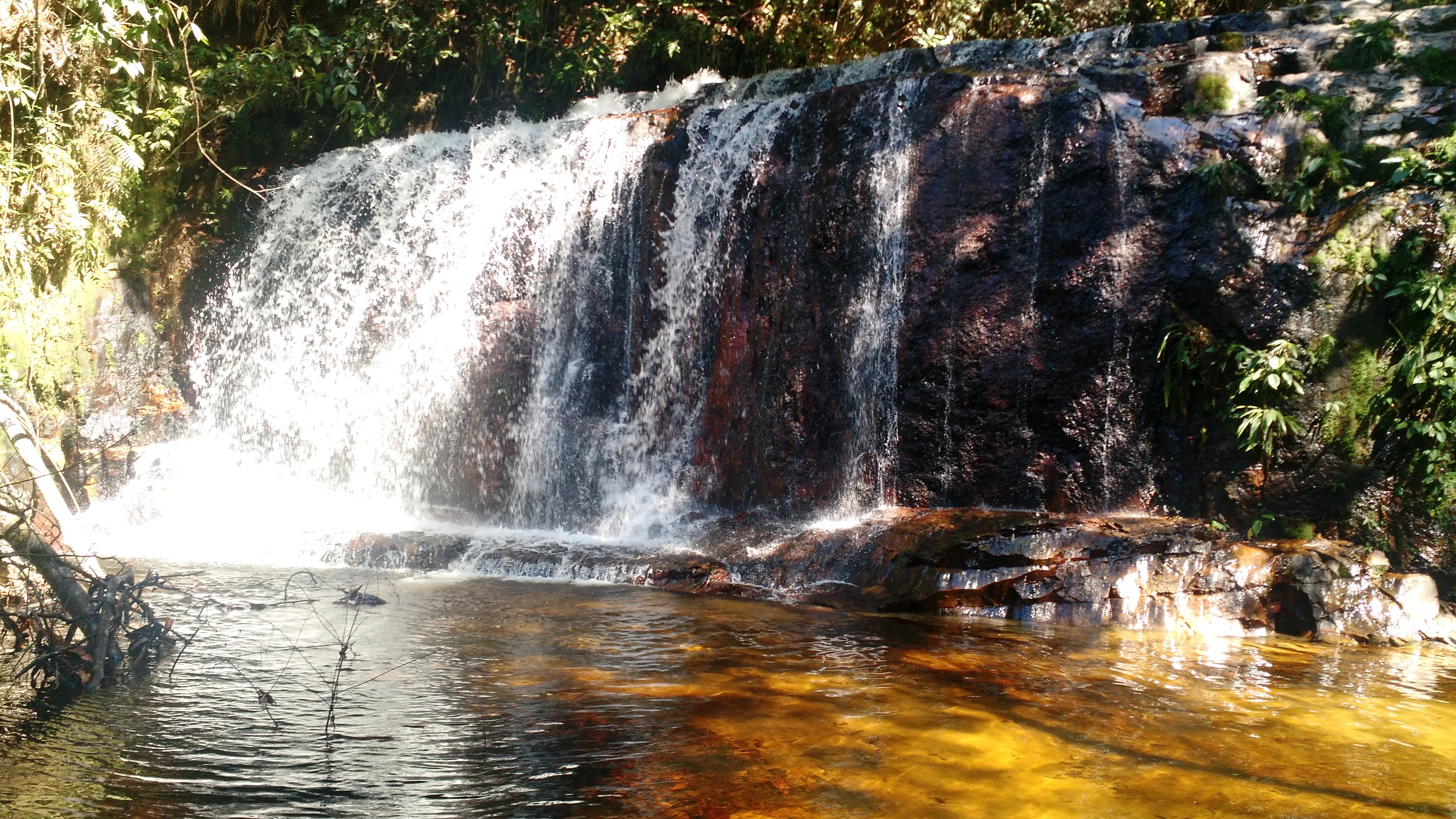
Serra do Divisor, Acre, Brazil

Vegetation: Rapid ecological assessment survey in 1991 characterised 10 forest types within the Park and recorded biodiversity. Most of the area is covered by open rainforest with palm trees or bamboos, dense and open sub-mountain rainforests, and dense and open alluvial rainforests (Periodically inundated forests). All forest types show quite differentiated structure, flora and tree species dominance. Open forest grows on poorly drained, wet or inundated soils. Palm-trees become more frequent on wetter soils. On dryer soils grow the dense lowland rainforests (Not-flooded forests) Open sub-mountain forests grow on the lower hillsides. Dense sub-mountain forests appear on the higher slopes. On the tops grows a " Low forest" with typical and rare sub-Andean species. Open alluvial forests grow on river margins frequently inundated by muddy waters. Dense alluvial forests appear in less frequently inundated areas.

Fauna: Rapid Ecological Assessment allowed to count in one month: 43 large mammal species, more than 100 amphibian and 30 reptile species, 485 bird species, 6 families, 33 genera and 55 species of bats, 21 genres and 64 species of Hymenopteres, and finally: 29 spider families (in the northern sector of the park, only). Of these, 17 mammals, 4 reptiles and 20 birds are considered to be threatened or rare species. Two new bird species were discovered. Local Population 1.200 families.

== People ==
Amazonian population live within or just at the margin of the Park's limits, most of whom have been collecting rubber for several generations. Low rubber prices induced these populations to start new and unsustainable activities, like cow ranching, timber cutting, commercial hunting and fishing and animal capturing, as well as fossils and stones trade. These activities are still incipient. It is planned to remove most of the population towards other, more favourable areas. The remaining population, having deep knowledge of the area, may be involved in the Park's surveillance, maintenance and tourism activities.

== Sources ==
- Ayres, José Márcio; Da Fonseca, Gustavo A. B.; Rylands, Anthony B.; Queiroz, Helder L.; Pinto, Luiz Paulo; Masterson, Donald; Cavalcanti, Roberto B. (2005), Os Corredores Ecológicos das Florestas Tropicais do Brasil (PDF) (in Portuguese), Sociedade Civil Mamirauá, archived from the original (PDF) on 2016-07-31
- Full list: PAs supported by ARPA, ARPA
- PARNA da Serra do Divisor (in Portuguese), ISA: Instituto Socioambiental
- Rhett Butler (2013-10-30), "Rebranded as the Rainforest Trust, green group launches push to protect 6M acres of Amazon rainforest", Mongay Bay
- "Serra Do Divisor National Park", protectedplanet.net, archived from the original on 2012-06-03
- "Southwest Amazon moist forests", Myers Enterprises II, archived from the original on 2017-03-17
