= Santa Rosa do Purus =

Municipality of Acre, Brazil

- Municipality
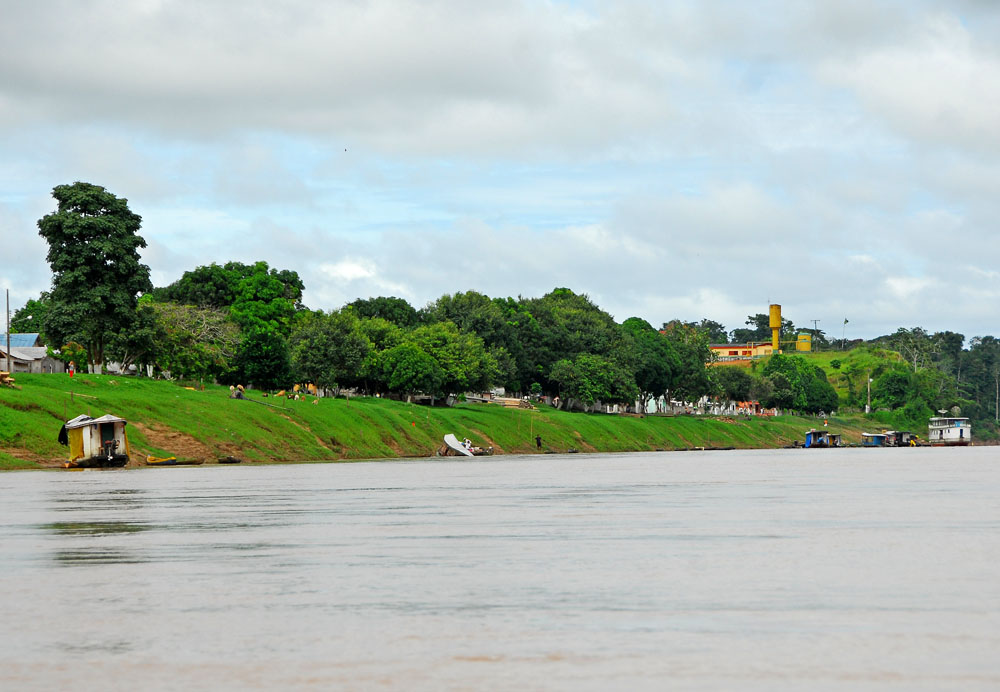

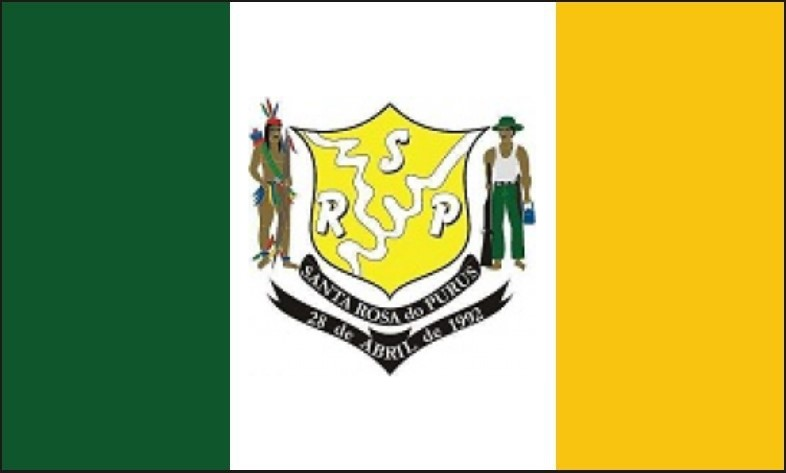
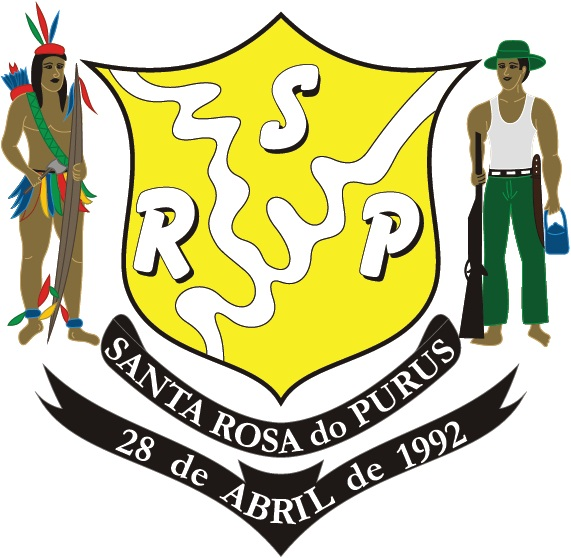
- Flag Coat of arms

- Location of municipality in Acre State
- Coordinates: 09°25′58″S 70°29′34″W
- Country: Brazil
- State: Acre

Government
  - Mayor: Assis Moura (PRP)

Area
  - Total: 2,309 sq mi (5,981 km^{2})

Population (2020 est)
  - Total: 6,717
- Time zone: UTC−5 (ACT)

Santa Rosa do Purus (Brazilian Portuguese pronunciation: [ˈsɐ̃tɐ ˈʁɔzɐ du puˈɾus]) is a municipality in the Brazilian state of Acre.

== Geography ==
Santa Rosa do Purus is the smallest city in Acre. It is located in the center of the state with the border of the Republic of Peru just across the river. Its population is 6,717 and its area is 5,981 km^{2}. Santa Rosa do Purus is one of the remotest communities in Brazil. 82% of the population is living in rural districts. The town of Santa Rosa lies on the banks of the Purus River. The only way to reach this town is by a two-three-day journey upriver by boat or by light aircraft. The only street is lined on either side with boxy, Monopoly-like wooden houses with corrugated metal roofs.

Connected to the ECT network since 2003, the local post office offers online operations and Internet access. This technological progress is a first in the history of the town, which previously had only two means of communication: the local radio station and the church's loudspeaker. The arrival of the Post Bank has made it easier for the town council to pay the salaries of its employees and those of state officials. The post office also collects municipal, state and federal taxes.

The municipality contains about 23% of the 695,303-hectare (1,718,130-acre) Chandless State Park, created in 2004, which protects an area of rainforest with bamboos that contains various endemic species of flora and fauna.
