= Marechal Thaumaturgo =

Municipality of Acre, Brazil

- Municipality
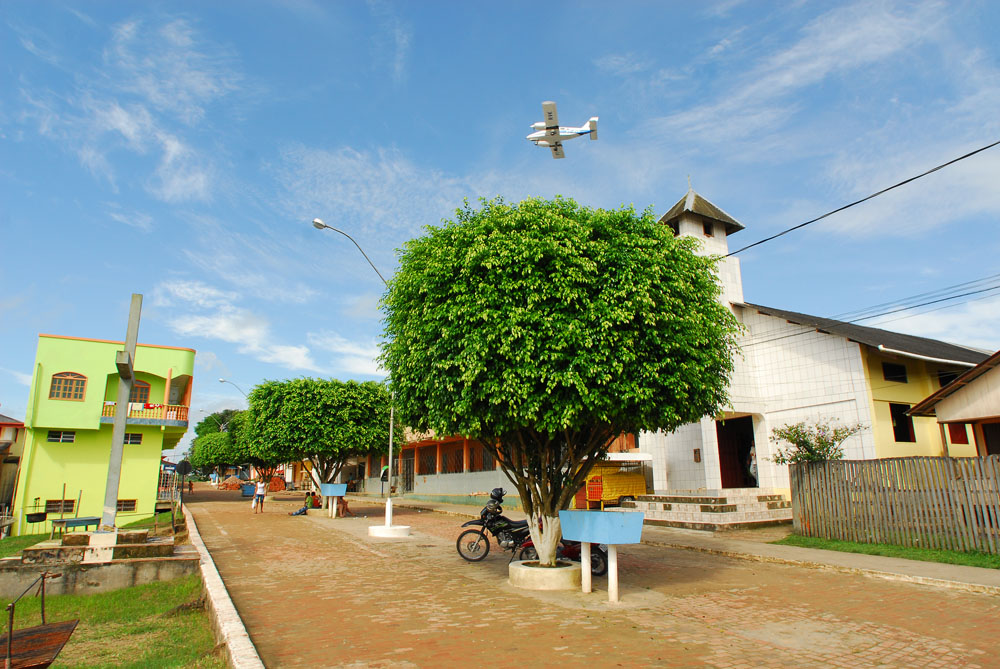

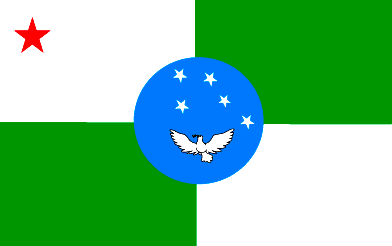
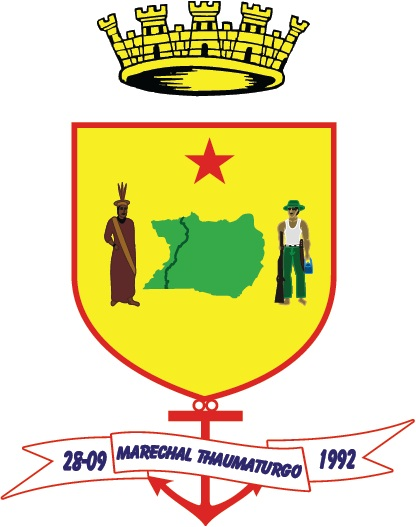
- Flag Coat of arms

- Location of municipality in Acre State

- Location in Brazil
- Coordinates: 8°56′50″S 72°47′25″W
- Country: Brazil
- State: Acre

Government
  - Mayor: Isaac Piyãko (PMDB)

Area
  - Total: 2,990 sq mi (7,744 km^{2})

Population (2020 est)
  - Total: 19,299
- Time zone: UTC−5 (ACT)

Marechal Thaumaturgo (Brazilian Portuguese pronunciation: [maɾeˈʃaw tawmɐˈtuʁɡu]) is a municipality located in the west of the Brazilian state of Acre. Its population is 19,299 and its area is 7,744 km^{2}.

== Geography ==
The municipality contains 5% of the 846,633-hectare (2,092,080-acre) Serra do Divisor National Park, created in 1989.

It contains most of the Alto Juruá Extractive Reserve, created in 1990, and 5% of the Alto Tarauacá Extractive Reserve, created in 2000.

=== Climate ===
Climate data for Marechal Thaumaturgo
Month	Jan	Feb	Mar	Apr	May	Jun	Jul	Aug	Sep	Oct	Nov	Dec	Year
Mean daily maximum °C (°F)	31.1 (88.0)	30.7 (87.3)	30.8 (87.4)	30.9 (87.6)	30.8 (87.4)	30.6 (87.1)	31.0 (87.8)	32.4 (90.3)	32.5 (90.5)	32.1 (89.8)	31.5 (88.7)	31.3 (88.3)	31.3 (88.4)
Daily mean °C (°F)	26.3 (79.3)	26.1 (79.0)	26.0 (78.8)	26.1 (79.0)	25.6 (78.1)	24.8 (76.6)	24.7 (76.5)	25.8 (78.4)	26.3 (79.3)	26.6 (79.9)	26.4 (79.5)	26.4 (79.5)	25.9 (78.7)
Mean daily minimum °C (°F)	21.6 (70.9)	21.5 (70.7)	21.3 (70.3)	21.3 (70.3)	20.5 (68.9)	19.1 (66.4)	18.5 (65.3)	19.2 (66.6)	20.2 (68.4)	21.2 (70.2)	21.4 (70.5)	21.5 (70.7)	20.6 (69.1)
Average precipitation mm (inches)	203 (8.0)	201 (7.9)	234 (9.2)	163 (6.4)	99 (3.9)	42 (1.7)	32 (1.3)	51 (2.0)	77 (3.0)	101 (4.0)	201 (7.9)	197 (7.8)	1,601 (63.1)
Source: http://en.climate-data.org/location/32412/
