= Jordão, Acre =

Municipality of Acre, Brazil

Jordão
- Municipality
- Municipality of Jordão; Município de Jordão (Portuguese)
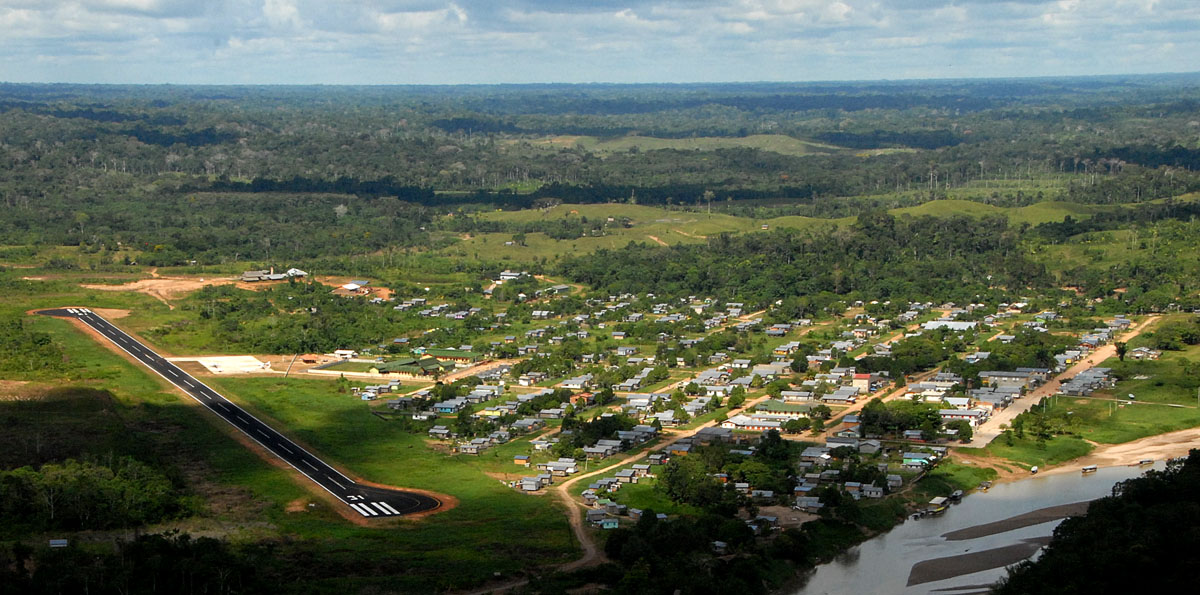

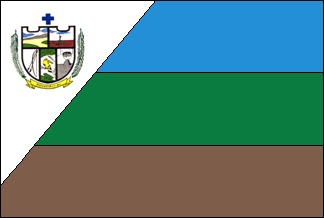
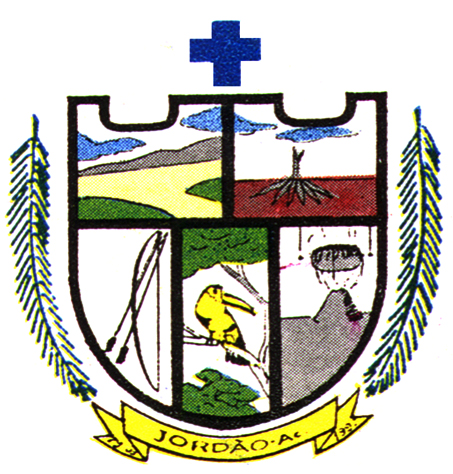
- Flag Coat of arms

- Location in Acre

- Location in Brazil
- Coordinates: 09°26′02″S 71°53′02″W
- Country: Brazil
- State: Acre

Government
  - Mayor: Elson Farias (PCdoB)

Area
  - Total: 2,096 sq mi (5,429 km^{2})

Population (2022)
  - Total: 9,222
- Time zone: UTC−5 (ACT)

Jordão (Brazilian Portuguese: [ʒoʁˈdɐ̃w]; 'Jordan') is a municipality located in the western region of the Brazilian state of Acre. Its population is 9,222 and its area is 5,429 km^{2}.

The municipality contains 62% of the Alto Tarauacá Extractive Reserve, created in 2000.

== Notable people ==
- Araujo Jordão, footballer
