= Porto Walter =

Municipality of Acre, Brazil

- Municipality
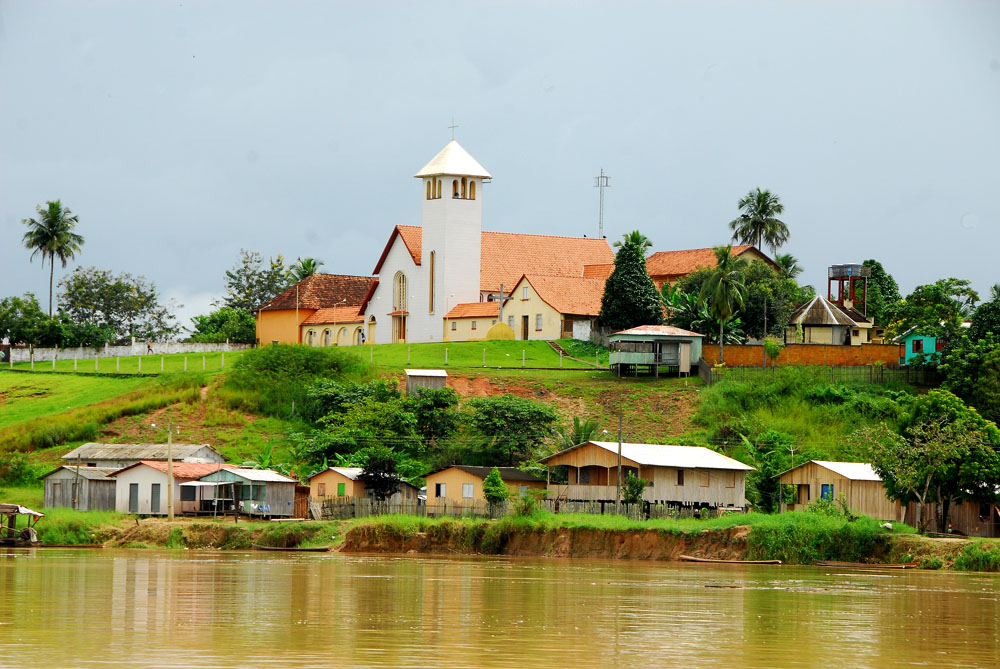

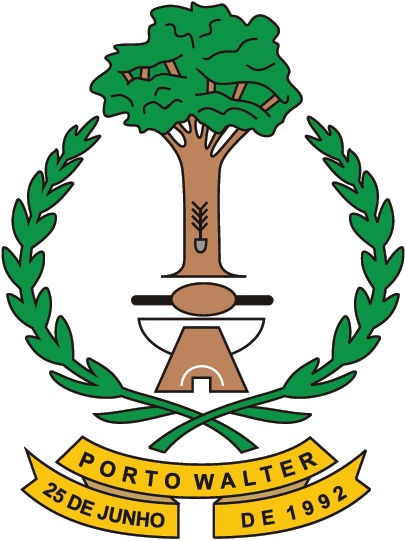
- Flag Coat of arms

- Location of municipality in Acre State

- Location in Brazil
- Coordinates: 08°16′08″S 72°44′38″W
- Country: Brazil
- State: Acre

Government
  - Mayor: Zezinho Barbary (PMDB)

Area
  - Total: 2,369 sq mi (6,136 km^{2})

Population (2020 est)
  - Total: 12,241
- Time zone: UTC−5 (ACT)

Porto Walter (Brazilian Portuguese pronunciation: [ˈpoʁtu ˈwawteʁ, - ˈvawteʁ]) is a municipality located in the west of the Brazilian state of Acre. Its population is 12,241 and its area is 6,136 km^{2}.

The municipality contains 27% of the 846,633-hectare (2,092,080-acre) Serra do Divisor National Park, created in 1989.
