= Rodrigues Alves, Acre =

Municipality of Acre, Brazil

- Municipality
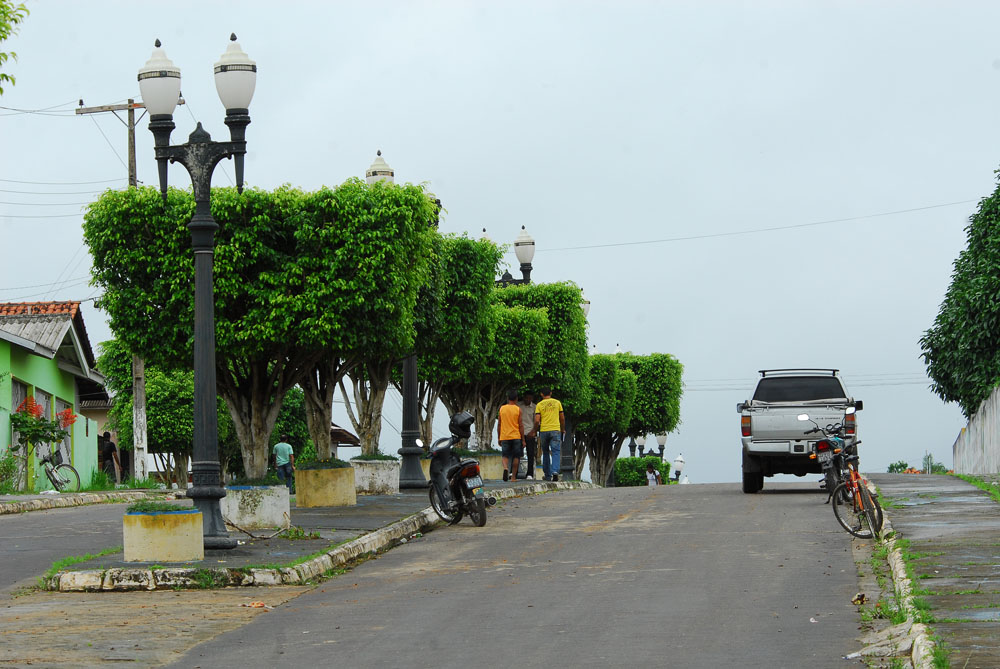

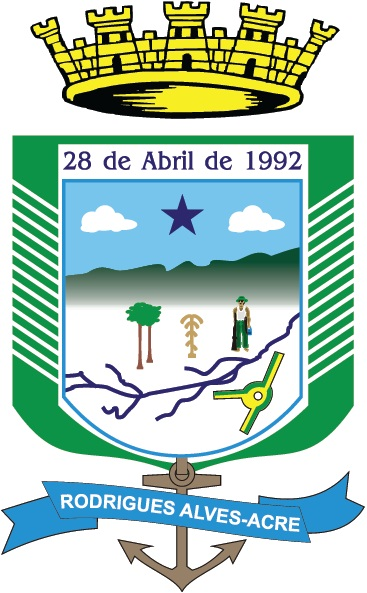
- Flag Coat of arms

- Location of municipality in Acre State

- Location in Brazil
- Coordinates: 07°44′31″S 72°38′49″W
- Country: Brazil
- State: Acre
- Established: April 28, 1992

Government
  - Mayor: Sebastiāo Correia (PMDB)

Area
  - Total: 1,276 sq mi (3,305 km^{2})

Population (2020 est)
  - Total: 19,351
- Time zone: UTC−5 (ACT)
- Website: www.rodriguesalves.ac.gov.br

Rodrigues Alves (Brazilian Portuguese pronunciation: [ʁoˈdɾiɡiz ˈawvis]) is a municipality located in the west of the Brazilian state of Acre. Its population is 19,351 according to the 2020 estimates.

Conservation units in the west of the state of Acre, Brazil

The municipality contains 13.45% of the 846,633-hectare (2,092,080-acre) Serra do Divisor National Park, created in 1989.

== Population ==
Historical population

Year	Pop.	±%
1991	4,704	—
1996	8,493	+80.5%
2000	8,093	−4.7%

Year	Pop.	±%
2007	12,428	+53.6%
2010	14,389	+15.8%
2020	19,351	+34.5%
