= Epitaciolândia =

Municipality of Acre, Brazil

- Municipality
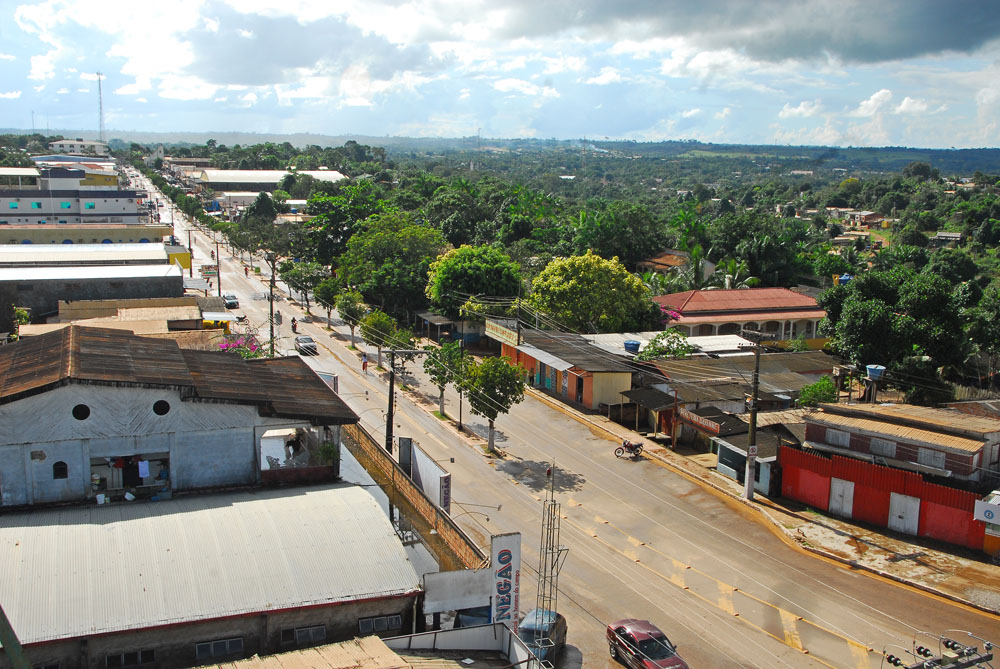

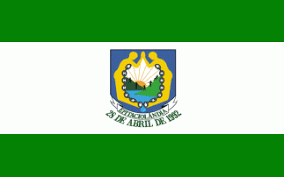
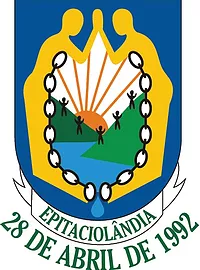
- Flag Coat of arms

- Location of municipality in Acre State

- Location in Brazil
- Coordinates: 11°01′44″S 68°44′27″W
- Country: Brazil
- State: Acre

Government
  - Mayor: Tião Flores (PSB)

Area
  - Total: 1,659 km^{2} (641 sq mi)

Population (2022)
  - Total: 18,757
- Time zone: UTC−5 (ACT)

Epitaciolândia (Brazilian Portuguese pronunciation: [epitasjuˈlɐ̃dʒi.ɐ]) is a municipality located in the southeast of state of Acre. Its population is 18,757 inhabitants and its area is 1,659 km^{2}. It is the southernmost municipality in Acre.

The municipality contains part of the 931,537-hectare (2,301,880-acre) Chico Mendes Extractive Reserve, a sustainable use environmental unit created in 1990.

== Consular representation ==
Bolivia has a Consulate in Epitaciolândia.
