= Amazofonia =

Portuguese dialect of the Amazon region, Brazil

- Native to: Pará, Amazonas, Acre, Roraima, Amapá
- Ethnicity: Caboclos and Bragantinos
- Native speakers: c. 12-13 million (2022)
- Language family: Indo-European: Italic; Latin; Romance; Western; Ibero-Romance; West Iberian; Galician-Portuguese; Portuguese; Vernacular Brazilian; Amazofonia

Language codes
- ISO 639-3: –
- Glottolog: None
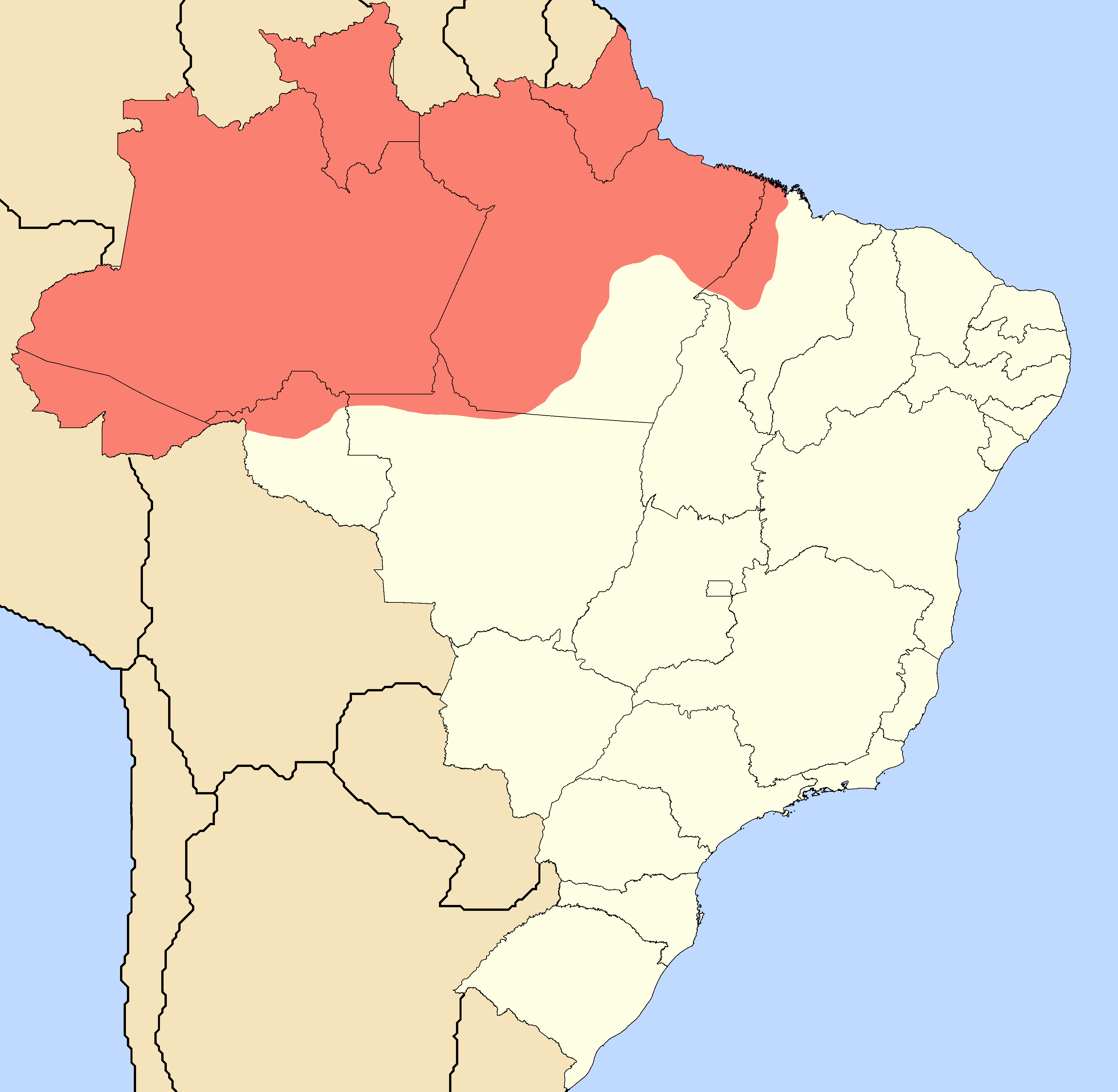
- Approximate range of the Nortista dialect over a map of Brazil.

Amazofonia or Nortista dialect is a dialect of Portuguese spoken by most people in Brazil's Amazônia Legal region. It is spoken in 5 of the 7 Northern states: Acre, Amapá, Amazonas, Pará (partially) and Roraima.

== Variation ==
Amazofonia has multiple subdialects:

- Traditional dialect: highly influenced by European Portuguese. Mainly spoken in Manaus (Amazonas) and Belém (Pará).
- Cametaense: spoken in Cametá (Pará) and some regions of Marajó (Pará).
- Metropolitano: spoken in the metropolitan regions of Manaus (Amazonas) and Belém (Pará).
- Bragantino: spoken in Bragança (Pará), Capanema (Pará) and Capitão Poço (Pará).
- Acreano: mainly influenced by Camba Spanish. Spoken in Brasiléia (Acre) and Plácido de Castro (Acre).
- Amapaense or Oiapoquês: spoken in Amapá.
- Roraimense: spoken in Roraima.

== General characteristics ==
- Preference for the pronoun tu over você (both meaning "you"), especially in colloquial speech. Você is sometimes used in formal speech, depending on the speaker.
- Palatalization of [d], [l], [n] and [t] to [dʒ], [ʎ], [ɲ] and [tʃ] before [i], [ĩ].
- Syllable-final [s] and [z] are both pronounced [ʃ].
- Unique vocabulary. For example: cunhã, carapanã, caba, muquira, etc.

== See also ==
- Brazilian Portuguese
- Portuguese dialects
