= Caboclo (disambiguation) =

Caboclo means a person having copper-coloured skin in Brazilian Portuguese. Caboclo may also refer to

- Bruno Caboclo (born 1995), Brazilian basketball player
- Caboclo people, a Brazilian ethnocultural group
- Faroeste Caboclo, a 1979 song recorded by Brazilian rock band Legião Urbana
- Brazilian corvette Caboclo (V19), an Imperial corvette of the Brazilian Navy
