= Guajara =

Guajara can refer to:

- Guajará, a Brazilian municipality
- Mount Guajara, a canarian mountain
- Guajara, a guanche princess
