= Capixaba, Acre =

Municipality of Acre, Brazil

Capixaba
- Municipality
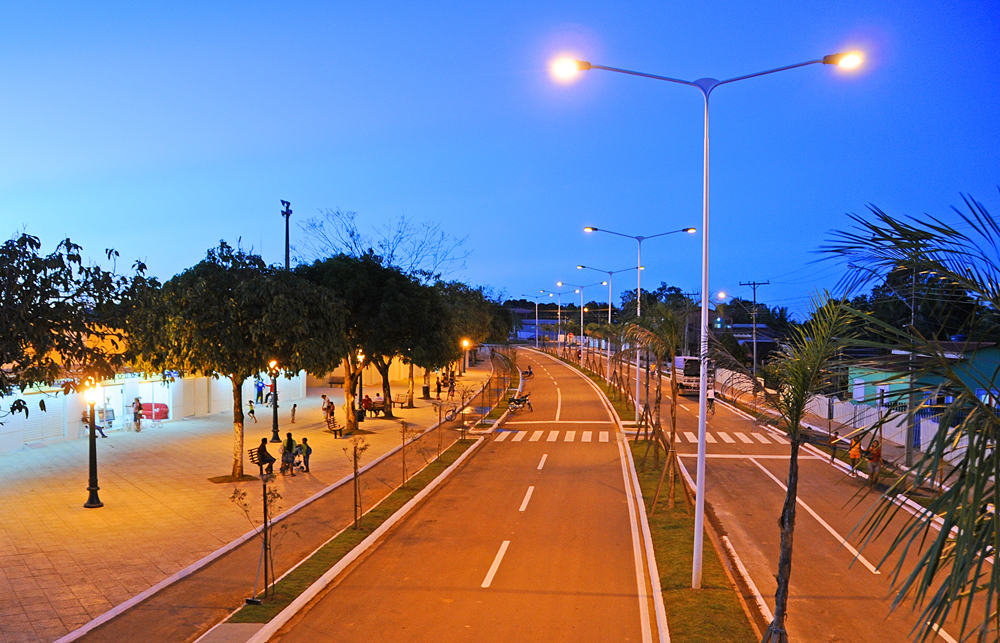
- Edmundo Pinto Avenue - Capixaba

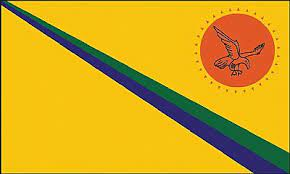
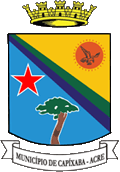
- Flag Coat of arms

- Location of municipality in Acre State

- Location in Brazil
- Coordinates: 10°34′22″S 67°40′33″W
- Country: Brazil
- State: Acre

Government
  - Mayor: José Augusto Gomes da Cunha (PP)

Area
  - Total: 661 sq mi (1,713 km^{2})

Population (2020 est)
  - Total: 12,008
- Time zone: UTC−5 (ACT)

Capixaba (Brazilian Portuguese pronunciation: [kapiˈʃabɐ]) is a municipality located in the southeast of the Brazilian state of Acre. Its population is 12,008 and its area is 1,713 km^{2}.

The municipality contains part of the 931,537-hectare (2,301,880-acre) Chico Mendes Extractive Reserve, a sustainable use environmental unit created in 1990.
