= Caboclo people =

Brazilian ethnic group

Povo Caboclo
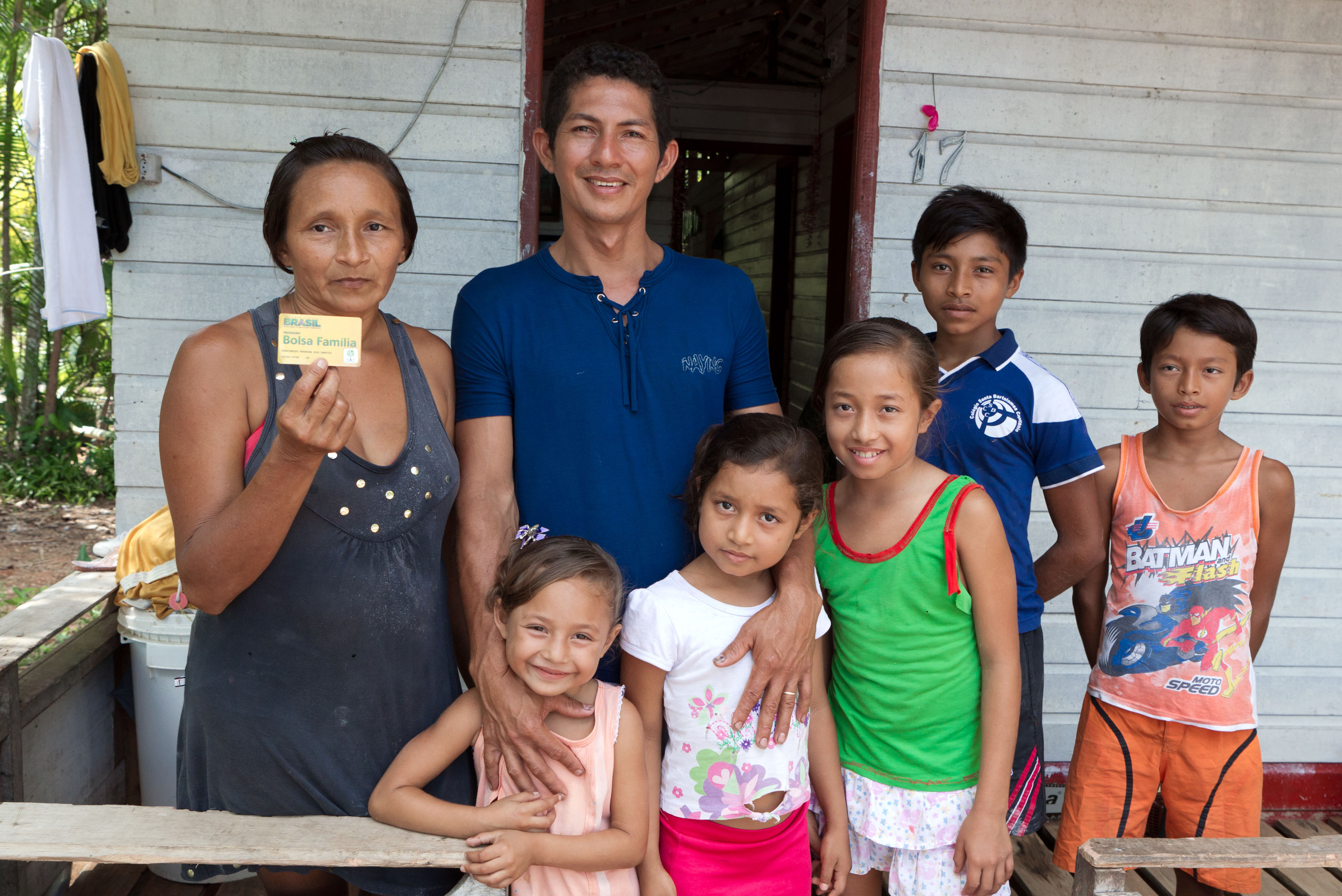
- Caboclo family in the village of Santa Isabel, Curralinho.

Total population
- c. 10-11 million (2022)

Regions with significant populations
- Brazil

Languages
- Portuguese language, Nortista dialect

Religion
- Close to evenly split between Roman Catholics and Protestants

Related ethnic groups
- Bragantinos, Maranhenses, Sertanejos, Portuguese, Tupis, Jês, Caribans, Arawaks and Bantus

The Caboclos (Natively: [kɐ'bokluʃ]), also known as Nortistas (Natively: [noʁˈt͡ʃiʃtɐʃ]) are a Brazilian ethnocultural group distributed across western Maranhão and most of the Northern region of Brazil, with exception of Indigenous reservations, northeastern Pará and parts of Rondônia and Tocantins.

Caboclos originated from the adaptation of Portuguese settlers to the climate and way of life of the Amazon rainforest and their admixing with the local indigenous populations and Africans imported as enslaved labour.

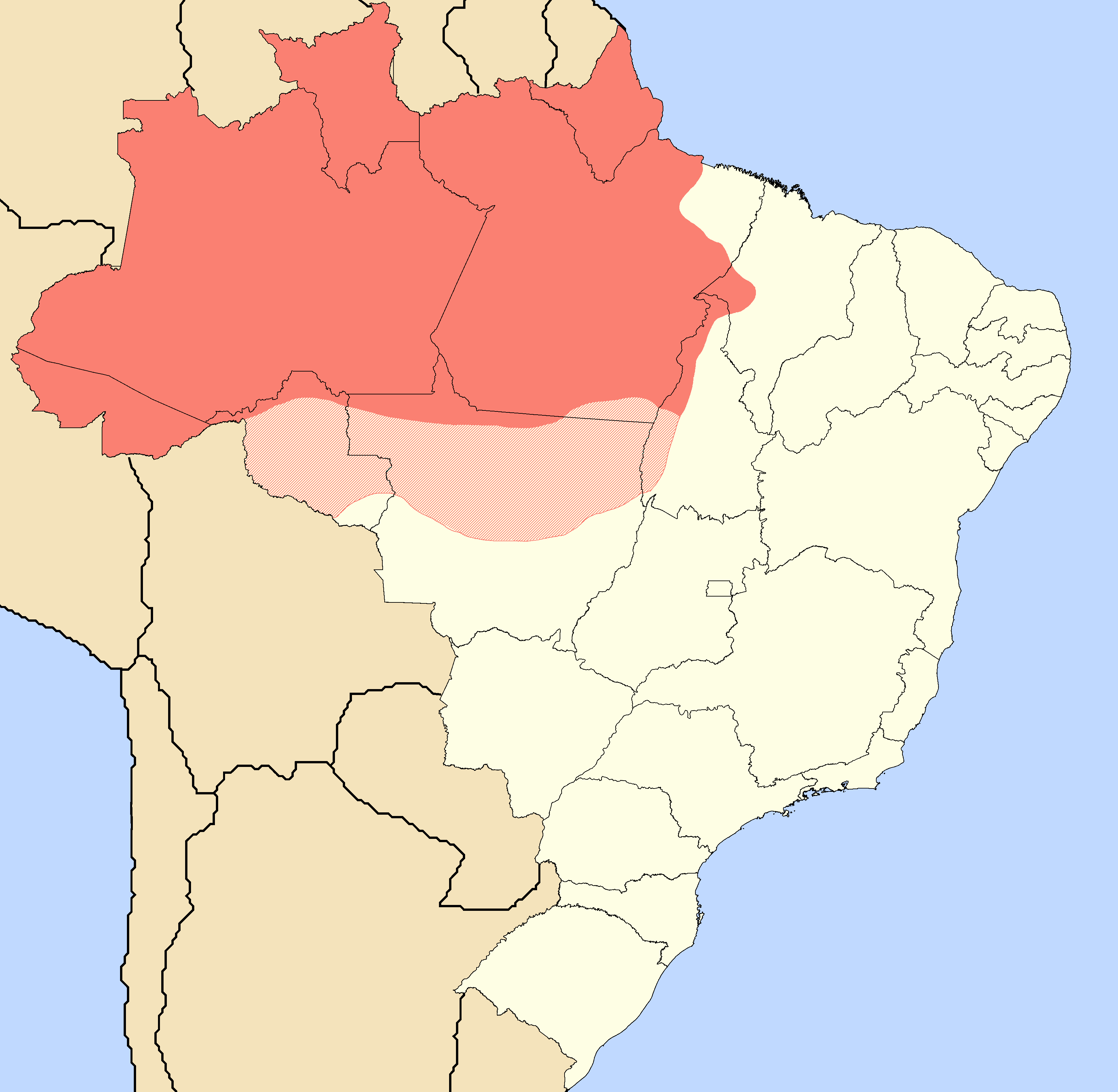
Area inhabited by the Caboclo people (red) and where they are a large minority (pink) over a map of Brazil.

== History ==
Portuguese settlement of the Amazon rainforest began in the early 17th century with the foundation of the village of Belém as well as sporadic hamlets and farms in the northeastern region of Pará. By the late 17th century colonists had already adventured upstream through the Amazon river and established the villages of Santarém and Manaus.

The equatorial and tropical climate of the region were unsuitable for European settlers, as they did not have immunity to tropical diseases such as malaria and yellow fever. However, the mixing with local indigenous populations that had lived in the Amazon basin for thousands of years gave origin to a population of mixed European and Amerindian ancestry, who were loyal to the Portuguese crown and followed Roman Catholicism while also being more resistant against the local illnesses. Caboclos and Bragantinos initially spoke Nheengatu, a lingua franca based on Tupi, but changes in colonial laws and policies regarding languages in the 18th century led to Portuguese slowly becoming the main language.

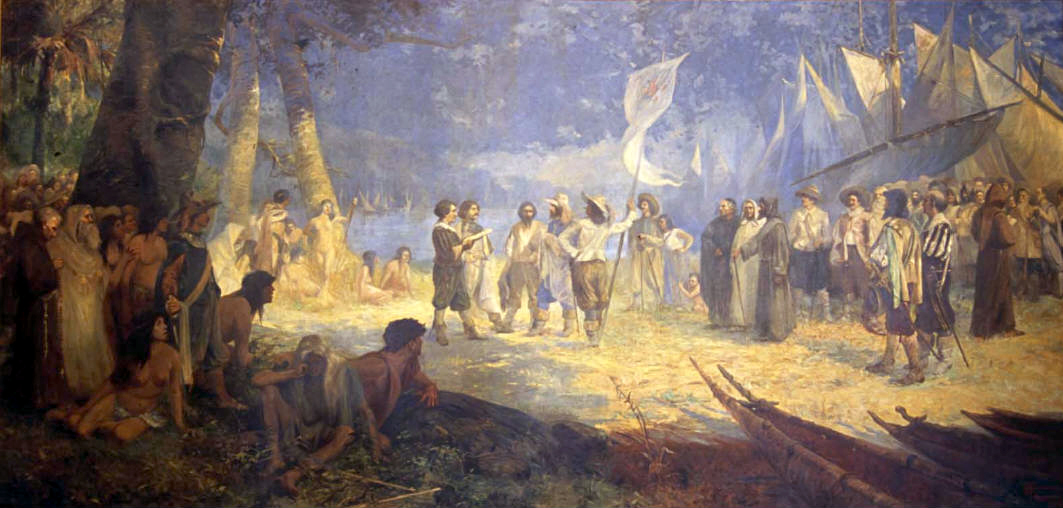
A Conquista da Amazônia, Antônio Parreiras, 1907. This painting portrays the colonization of the Amazon rainforest and the conversion of the natives to Catholicism.

Settlement of the deeper Amazon during colonial times was almost solely based on the banks of the Amazon, Tocantins, Negro, Madeira and other easily navigable rivers, as they could be defended from indigenous revolts by Portuguese fleets and were able to hold ports for exporting of products to mainland Portugal.

The economy of the colonial Brazilian Amazon was largely based on the extraction of "drogas do sertão", spices, fruits and other exotic products from the tropics that were very valuable in Europe, such as urucum, cravo-da-terra, guaraná, cinnamon, Brazil nut, copaíba, salsaparrilha, among others. As the fertility of the Amazonian soil for agricultural production is mediocre, the sustenance of the local Caboclos depended largely on fishing and gathering of local fruits, although the cultivation of cassava was able to provide decent nourishment, as the crop had been domesticated by indigenous peoples in the Amazon thousands of years before and therefore was already adapted to the local soil.

Northern Brazil received comparatively less African slaves than the rest of the Brazilian regions, around 50 thousand from 1550 to 1888. Despite this, the considerable amount of African ancestry among modern Caboclos (15 to 20% average) seen to point towards higher fertility and survival rates among black people in the region when compared to the rest of the country.

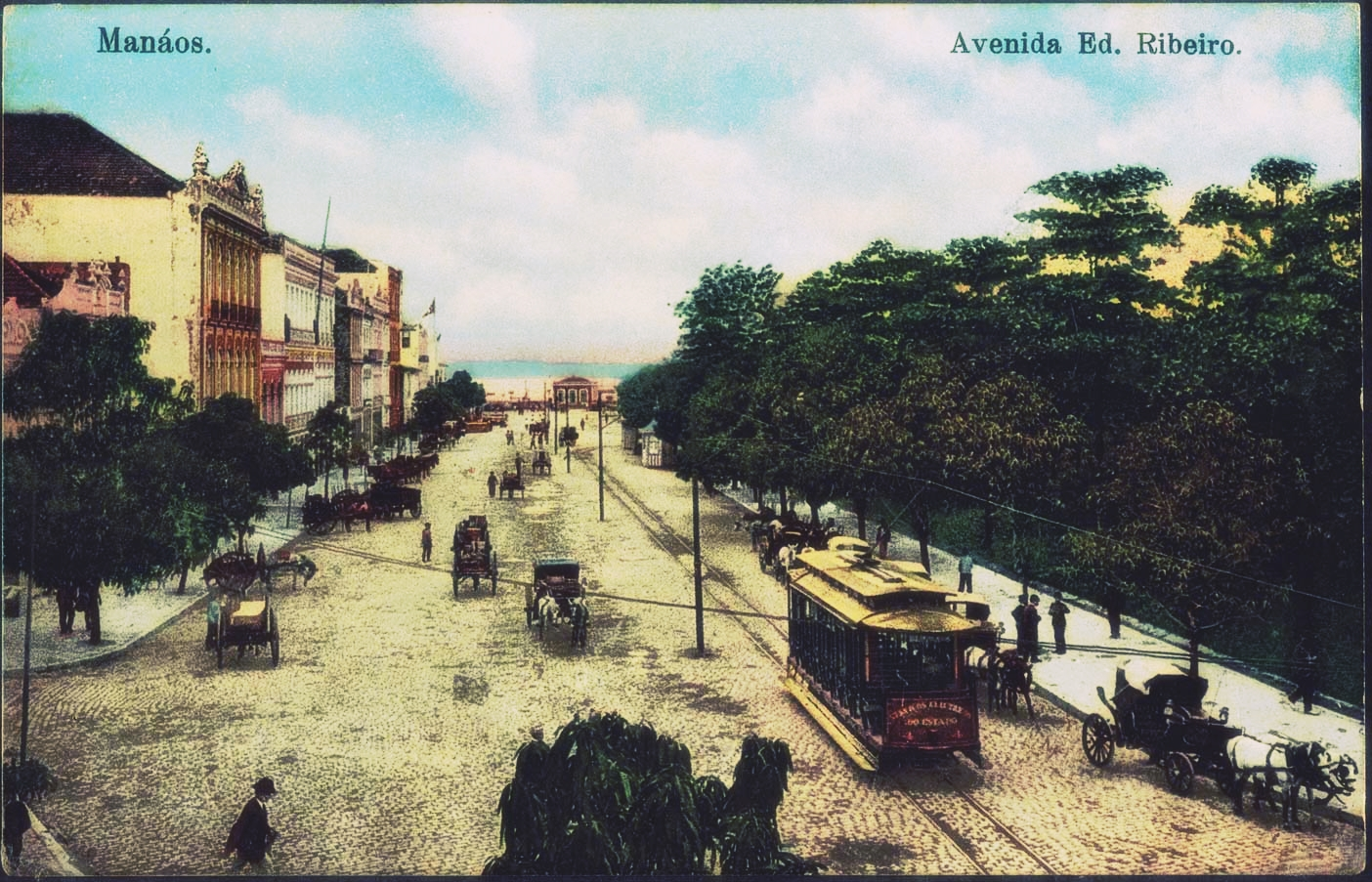
The city of Manaus in 1909.

The culture of northeastern Pará had more Portuguese and less indigenous cultural influence than those of the rest of the north, as well as having a lifestyle that had more presence of farming and animal husbandry. These differences in influences and way of life led to a differentiation from the Caboclo and the Bragantino cultures over the centuries, although the Bragantino culture is still the closest of the Brazilian cultures to the Caboclos, together with the Maranhense.

Caboclos are traditionally quite respectful to the forest and don't practice mass deforestation or logging, a cultural heritage that comes from the native Amazonian peoples. Technological advancements regarding the use of fertilizers in agriculture made the cultivation of some crops that were not apt for the local soil possible in the mid 20th century, which opened way for destruction of forest in the region. Despite this, the vast majority of deforestation in the amazon occurs in the arc of deforestation, an area that lays outside of the Caboclo heartland that was settled by Caipiras and Gaúcho frontier settlers in the 20th century.

== Culture ==
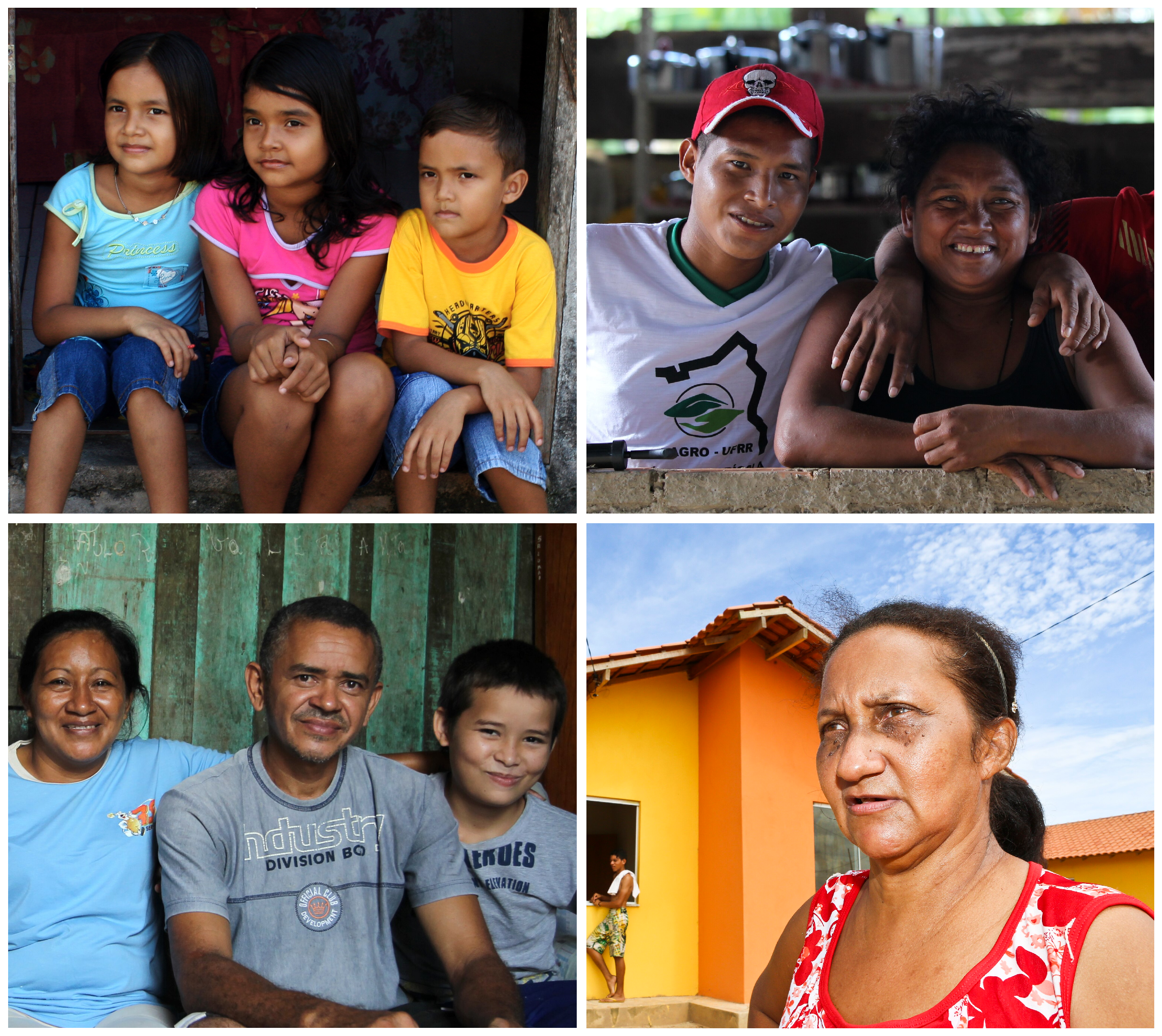
Caboclo people of various ages and genders.

Historically Caboclos were overwhelmingly Catholic, but the introduction of American-style Protestantism to Brazil in the late 20th century found great success in the Northern region of the country, with the number of Protestants in the state of Amazonas growing from 21% in 1990 to 39% in 2022. As of 2022 the population of the Caboclo territory was around 45% Roman Catholic, 40% Protestant and 9% irreligious.

Caboclo culture has the highest influence of Indigenous cultural influence of any Brazilian ethnic group, with exception of the Amerindian Brazilian ethnicities themselves. These influences are evident in Caboclo festivities, cuisine and folkloric figures such as the Boto, Curupira, Mapinguari, Iara and Boiúna.

Caboclos are considerably more family-oriented and adept of extended family households than the rest of the Brazilian ethnocultures. As of 2022 Northern Brazil had the highest average number of people per household of any Brazilian region, with the Caboclo territory averaging 3,5 people per household. They also have the highest fertility rates.

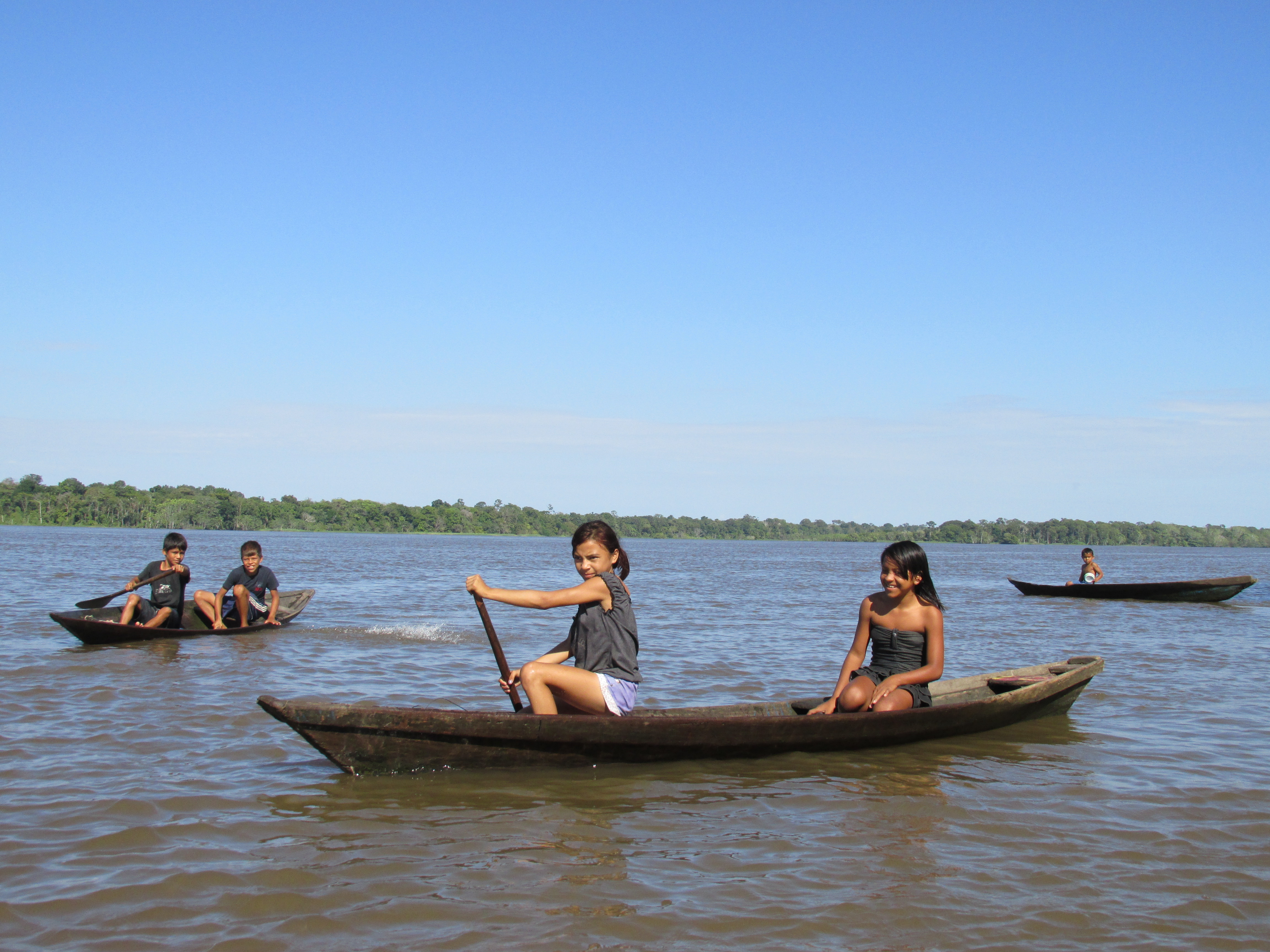
Ribeirinho Caboclo children crossing a river on small canoes, 2015.

Traditional foods and dishes of the Caboclos include Tacacá, Pirarucu de Casaca, Tambaqui, X-Caboquinho, Acaí with fish and cassava flour, Jaraqui, Tucunaré, Tapioca com Tucumã, Cupuaçu, Taperebá, Damurida, Banana da Terra, Jambu, Baixaria, Saltenha, Gurijuba, Camarão no Bafo and Gengibirra.

Dances, music and festivities of the Caboclos include the Festival de Parintins, Carimbó, fishing festivals, açaí and cassava harvest festivals, Boi-Bumbá, Ciranda, Maçarico, Toada, Beiradão, Marabaixo, Festival dos Botos, Festival dos Carás, among others. The very activities of navigating and fishing are a big part of the Caboclo culture.

== Genetics ==
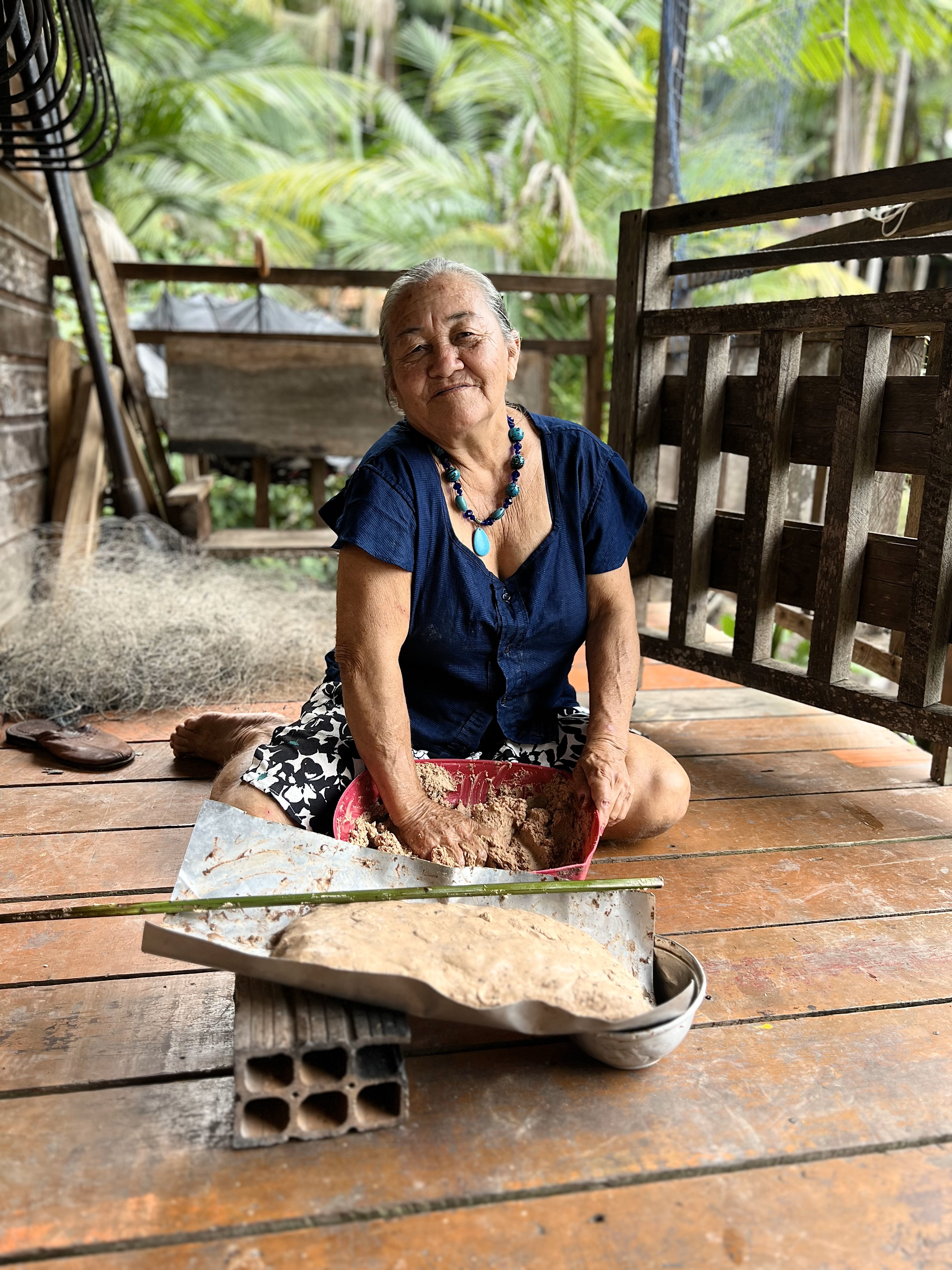
Woman extracting andiroba oil in Pará, 2025.

Caboclos are one of the Brazilian populations with the highest proportion of pardos, people that are identified as neither white nor black, but instead something in between. According to the 2022 Brazilian census 70% of Caboclos self-identified as pardo, 22% as white and 8% as black.

The vast majority of Caboclos are mixed to some degree, with varying rates of European, African or Amerindian ancestry. They have the highest proportion of Amerindian ancestry of any non-indigenous Brazilian population. A 2019 systematic scoping review of 51 studies analyzed the autosomal DNA composition of people from various cities and states across Brazil, the results for the Caboclo territory were as follows:

| Municipality | European ancestry | African ancestry | Amerindian ancestry |
|---|---|---|---|
| Santarém | 60% | 11% | 29% |
| Goianésia do Pará | 44% | 32% | 25% |
| Macapá | 48% | 24% | 28% |
| Manaus | 58% | 14% | 28% |
| Presidente Figueiredo | 44% | 18% | 38% |
| Porto Velho | 57% | 24% | 19% |

== Notable Caboclos ==
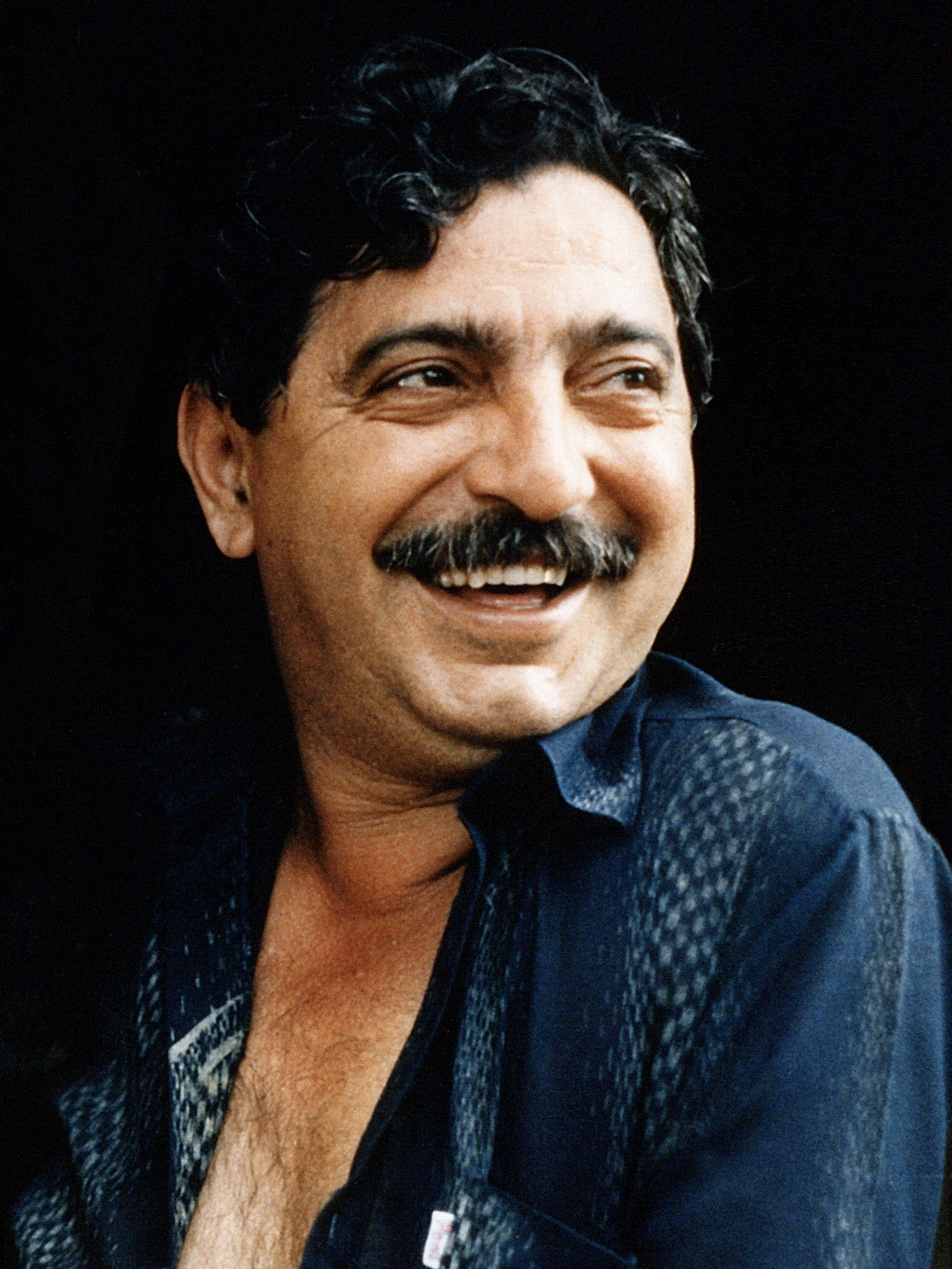
Francisco Alves Mendes Filho (1944-1988) was a Caboclo enviromentalist that dedicated his life to the protection of the Amazon rainforest and the rights of local Indigenous peoples.

- Chico Mendes - environmentalist
- José Veríssimo - writer
- Marina Silva - politician and environmentalist
- Enéas Carneiro - politician and writer
- Joelma - musician
- Weverton - footballer
- Malvino Salvador - actor
- João Donato - musician
- Dona Onete - musician
- Thiago Maia - footballer
- Patrícia Bastos - musician
