= Bujari =

Municipality in Acre, Brazil

- Municipality of Acre, Brazil
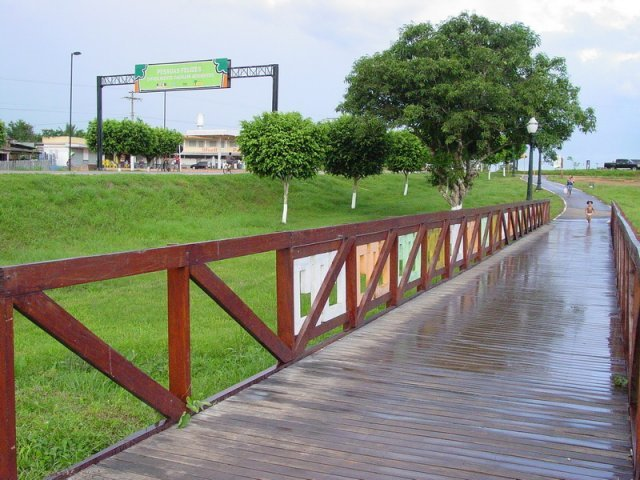

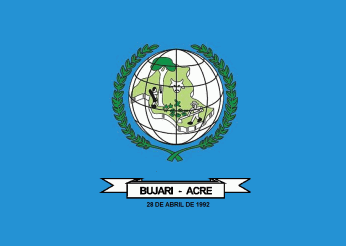
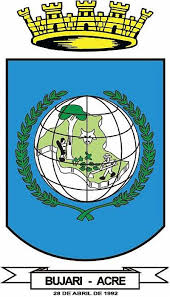
- Flag Coat of arms
- Etymology: Name of a former rubber tapping factory
- Location of Bujari in Acre

- Location within Brazil Location within South America
- Coordinates: 9°49′51″S 67°57′7″W
- Country: Brazil
- Region: North
- State: Acre
- Founded: 28 April 1992

Government
  - Mayor: João Edvaldo Teles de Lima (PDT) (2025-2028)
  - Vice Mayor: Maria Aparecida Oliveira da Rocha (PP) (2025-2028)

Area
  - Total: 3,034.869 km^{2} (1,171.769 sq mi)
- Elevation: 238 m (781 ft)

Population (2022)
  - Total: 12,917
  - Density: 4.26/km^{2} (11.0/sq mi)
- Demonym: Bujariense (Brazilian Portuguese)
- Time zone: UTC-05:00 (Acre Time)
- Postal code: 69926-000
- HDI (2010): 0.589 – medium
- Website: bujari.ac.gov.br

Bujari (Brazilian Portuguese pronunciation: [buʒaˈɾi]) is a municipality located in the northeast of the Brazilian state of Acre. The estimated population in 2020 is 10,420.
