= Acre (state) =

State of Brazil

- State
- Flag Coat of arms
- Motto: Nec Luceo Pluribus Impar (Latin) "I do not shine differently from the others"
- Anthem: "Hino do Acre"
- Location in Brazil
- Coordinates: 9°S 70°W
- Country: Brazil
- Capital and largest city: Rio Branco

Government
  - Type: Unitary state
  - Governor: Mailza Gomes (PP)
  - Vice Governor: Vacant
  - Senators: Alan Rick (REP); Márcio Bittar (PL); Sérgio Petecão (PSD)
  - Legislature: Legislative Assembly of Acre

Area
  - Total: 164,173 km^{2} (63,388 sq mi)
  - Rank: 16th

Population (2022)
  - Total: 830,018
  - Rank: 25th
  - Density: 5.06/km^{2} (13.1/sq mi)
  - Rank: 22nd
- Demonym: Acriano(a)

GDP (2024)
  - Total: R$28.322 billion (US$5.256 billion)

HDI
  - Year: 2024
  - Category: 0.754 – high (25th)
- Time zone: UTC−5 (ACT)
- Postal Code: 69900-000 to 69999-000
- ISO 3166 code: BR-AC
- Website: www.ac.gov.br

Acre (/ˈɑːkrə/, AH-krə; Portuguese: [ˈakɾi]) is a state located in the west of the North Region of Brazil and the Amazonia Legal. Located in the westernmost part of the country, at a two-hour time difference from Brasília, Acre is bordered clockwise by the Brazilian states of Amazonas and Rondônia to the north and east, along with an international border with the Bolivian department of Pando to the southeast, and the Peruvian regions of Madre de Dios, Ucayali and Loreto to the south and west. Its capital and largest city is Rio Branco. Other important places include Cruzeiro do Sul, Sena Madureira, Tarauacá and Feijó. The state, which has 0.42% of the Brazilian population, generates 0.2% of the Brazilian GDP.

Intense extractive activity in the rubber industry, which reached its height in the early 20th century, attracted Brazilians from many regions to the state. From the mixture of sulista, southeastern Brazil, nordestino, and indigenous traditions arose a diverse cuisine.

Fluvial transport, concentrated on the Juruá and Moa rivers, in the western part of the state, and the Tarauacá and Envira rivers in the northwest, is the principal form of transportation, especially between November and June. Heavy seasonal rains frequently make the BR-364 impassable in those months; it usually connects Rio Branco to Cruzeiro do Sul.

== Etymology ==
The name, which was given to the territory in 1904, and to the state in 1962, is derived from one of the local rivers, perhaps originates from the Tupi word a'kir ü "green river", or from the form a'kir, of the Tupi word ker, "to sleep, to rest". It is believed more likely to be derived from Aquiri, a transliteration by European explorers of the term Umákürü, or Uakiry, from the Ipurinã dialect. Another hypothesis is that Acquiri derives from Yasi'ri, or Ysi'ri, meaning "flowing or swift water".

According to one account, agriculturist João Gabriel de Carvalho Melo wrote during an 1878 trip on the Purús River to merchant Viscount of Santo Elias (from Pará), asking him for goods to be sent to the "mouth of the Aquiri River". In Belém, the local merchant or his employees either misinterpreted Gabriel's handwriting, or he spelled the name wrong: the goods and invoice which Gabriel received were marked as having been sent to the Acre River.

Acre possesses some nicknames: the End of Brazil, The Rubber Tree State, the Latex State (from when it was a center of rubber production) and the Western End.

The native inhabitants of Acre are called acrianos, in the singular acriano. Until the entry according to the Orthographic Agreement of 1990, the correct spelling was acreano in the singular and in the plural acreanos. In 2009, with the new orthographic agreement, the change generated controversy between the Academy of Letters of Acre (Academia Acreana de Letras) and the Brazilian Academy of Letters (Academia Brasileira de Letras). The latter said that the change would mean the denial of the state's historical and cultural roots, by changing the last letter of the toponym from "E" to "I".

== Geography ==
Climate types of Acre

The state of Acre occupies an area of 152,581 km^{2} (58,912 sq mi) (58,911 mi^{2}) in the extreme west of Brazil. It is located at 70º west longitude and at 9º south latitude. In Brazil, the state is part of the North Region, forming borders with the states of Amazonas and Rondônia, and with two countries: Peru and Bolivia.

Practically all of the terrain of the state of Acre is part of the low sandstone plateau, or terra firme, morphological unit which dominates most of the Brazilian Amazon. These terranes rise, in Acre, from the southeast to the northeast, with very tabular topography in general. In the extreme west is found the Serra da Contamana or Serra do Divisor, along the western border, with the highest altitudes in the state (609 m; 1,998 ft). About 63% of the state's surface lies between 200 and 300 m (660 and 980 ft) in height; 16% between 300 and 609 (984 and 1,998 ft); and 21% between 200 and 135 (656 and 443 ft).

The climate is hot and very humid, of the Am type in the Köppen climate classification system, and the monthly average temperatures vary between 24 and 27 °C (75 and 81 °F), being the lowest average of the North Region. The rainfall reaches an annual total of 2,100 mm (83 in), with a clear dry season in the months of June, July, and August.

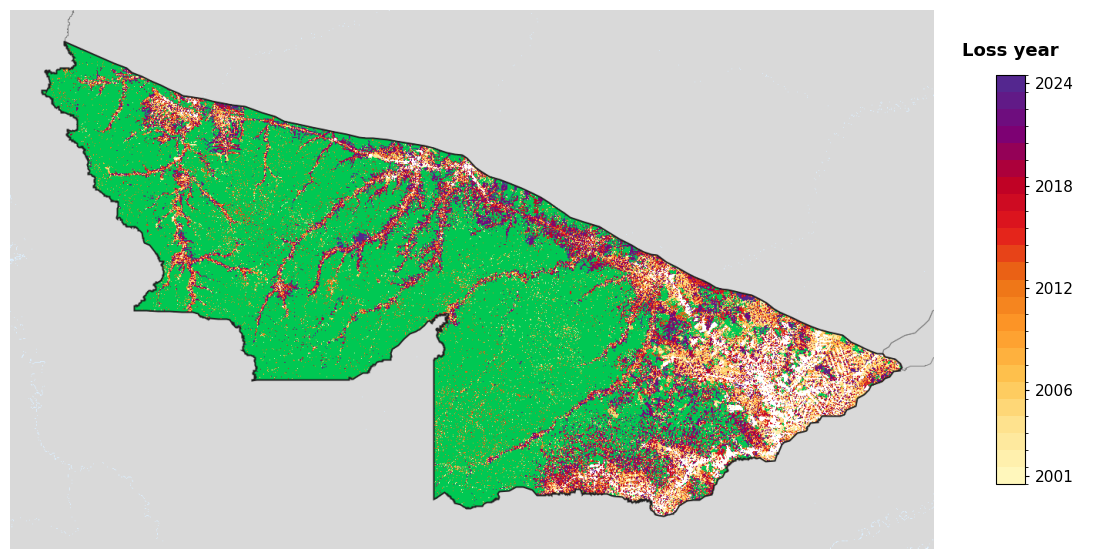
Tree-cover loss year in Acre, 2001-2024, from the Global Forest Change dataset.

The Amazon rainforest covers all of the state territory. Very rich in rubber trees of the most valuable species (Hevea brasiliensis) and Brazil nut trees (Bertholletia excelsa), the forest guarantees that Acre is the greatest national producer of rubber and nuts. Acre's principal rivers, mostly navigable during the wet season (the Juruá, Tarauacá, Envira, Purús, Iaco, and Acre), cross the state with almost parallel courses which converge only outside of its territory.

The largest recorded Black Caiman, measured at 7.7 metres (25 feet) and weighing 1,310 kg (2,890 lb), was shot in Acre in 1965.

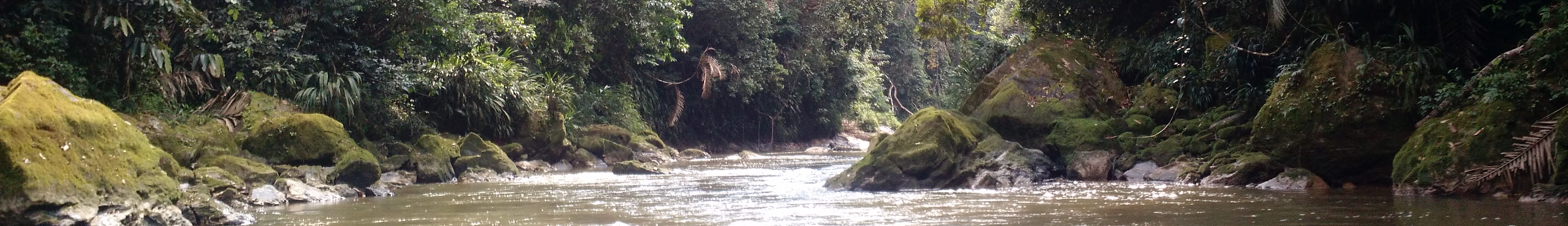
The Môa River, at the Serra do Divisor National Park, Juruá River Valley, Western Acre

The Amazon represents over half of the planet's remaining rainforests and comprises the largest and most species-rich tract of tropical rainforest in the world. Wet tropical forests are the most species-rich biome, and tropical forests in the Americas are consistently more species-rich than the wet forests in Africa and Asia. As the largest tract of tropical rainforest in the Americas, the Amazonian rainforests have unparalleled biodiversity. More than 1/3 of all species in the world live in the Amazon Rainforest.

== Statistical and legal subdivisions ==
Acre is divided into 22 municipalities, 5 immediate regions and 2 intermediate regions:

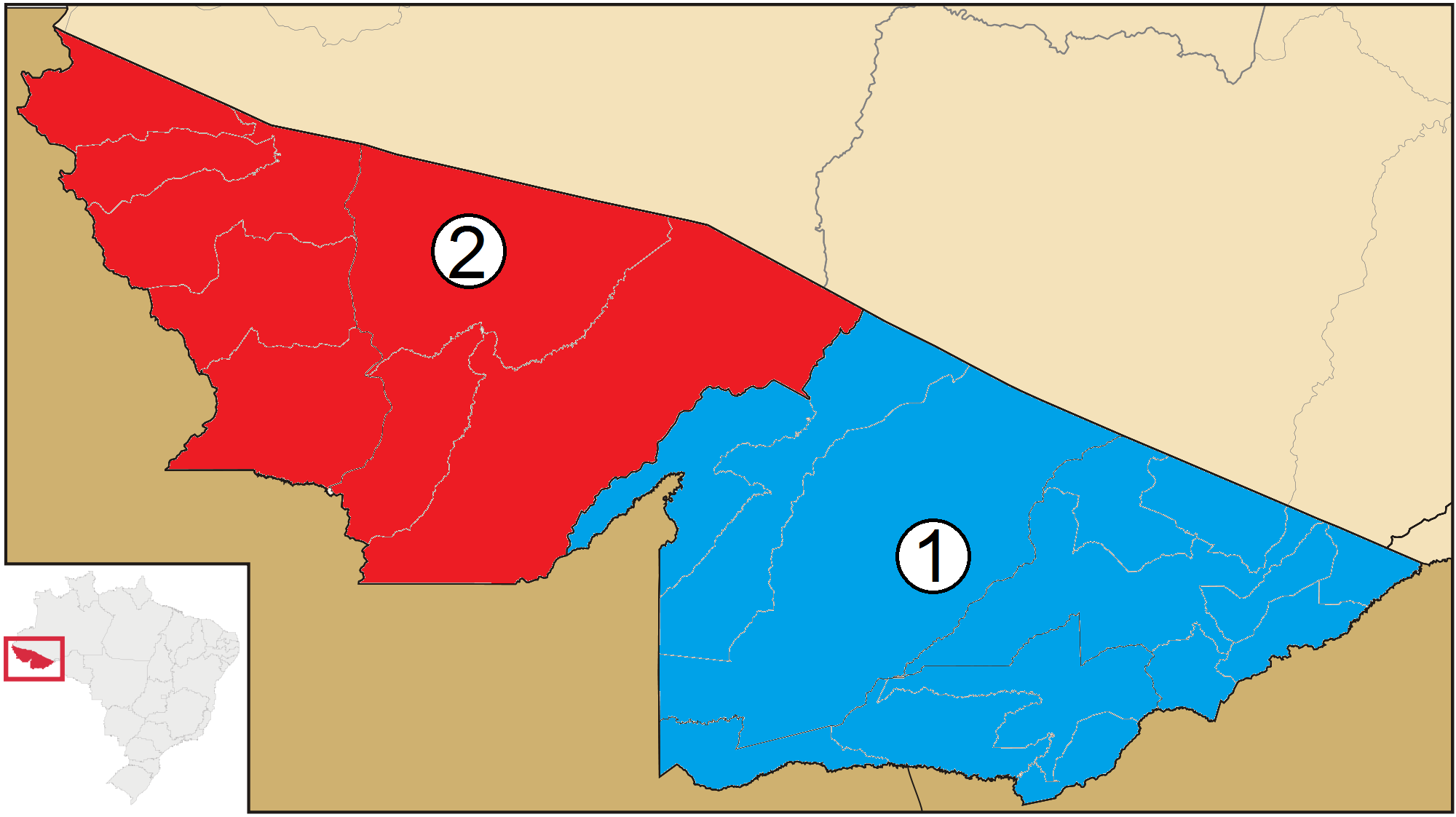
1 Mesoregion of Vale do Acre 2 Mesoregion of Vale do Juruá

=== Rio Branco ===
- Immediate Region of Brasileia
    - Assis Brasil
    - Brasiléia
    - Epitaciolândia
    - Xapuri
- Immediate Region of Rio Branco
    - Acrelândia
    - Bujari
    - Capixaba
    - Plácido de Castro
    - Porto Acre
    - Rio Branco
    - Senador Guiomard
- Microregion of Sena Madureira
    - Manoel Urbano
    - Santa Rosa do Purus
    - Sena Madureira

=== Cruzeiro do Sul ===
- Immediate Region of Cruzeiro do Sul
    - Cruzeiro do Sul
    - Mâncio Lima
    - Marechal Thaumaturgo
    - Porto Walter
    - Rodrigues Alves
- Immediate Region of Tarauacá
    - Feijó
    - Jordão
    - Tarauacá

== History ==
Historical affiliations

Viceroyalty of Peru 1542–1824
Peru and Bolivia 1825–1836
Peru-Bolivian Confederation 1836–1839
Peru and Bolivia 1839–1899
(Acre (state)) First Republic of Acre 1899–1900
Peru and Bolivia 1900
(Acre (state)) Second Republic of Acre 1900
Peru and Bolivia 1900–1903
Third Republic of Acre 1903
Brazil 1903–present

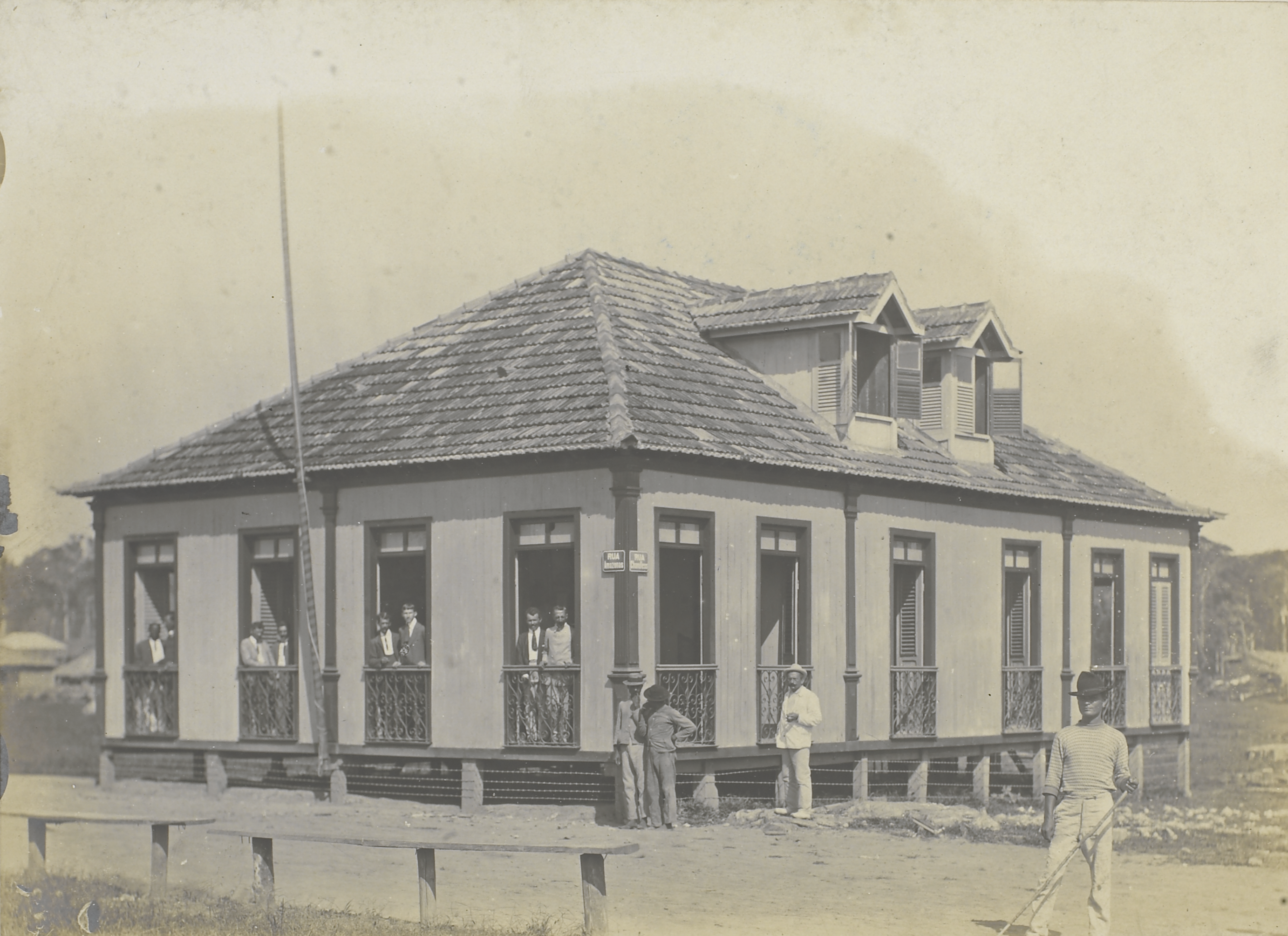
Sena Madureira City Hall, 1905, Acre, Brazil

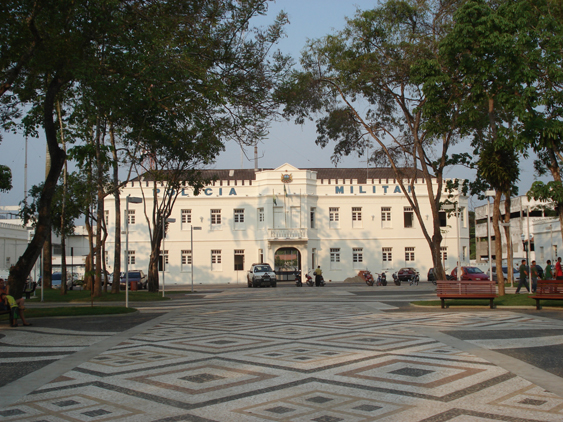
Military Police in Rio Branco

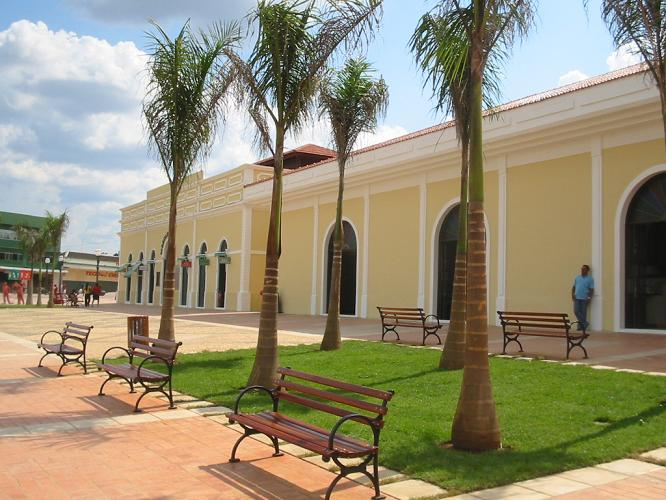
Rio Branco in the morning

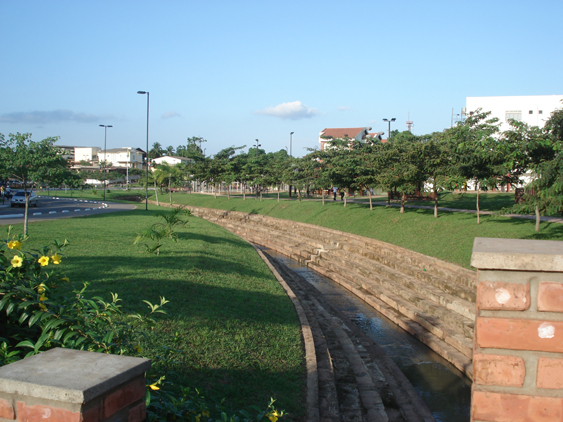
View of Rio Branco

=== Pre-Columbian era ===
The region of present-day Acre is thought to have been inhabited by Pre-Columbian civilizations since at least 2,100 years ago. Evidence includes complex geoglyphs of this age found in the area. The natives who crafted them are believed to have had a relatively advanced knowledge of this technology. Since at least the early 15th century, the region has been inhabited by peoples who spoke Panoan languages; their territory was geographically close to that of the Inca.

=== Bolivian–Peruvian rule ===
In the mid-18th century, the region was colonized by the Spanish and became part of the Viceroyalty of Peru. Following the Peruvian and Bolivian wars of independence, which ended in 1826, the region and large portions around it became part of both Peru and Bolivia respectively, but independent of Spain and both states disputed the territory. It was a territory of the short-lived Peru–Bolivian Confederation (1836–1839), until the two countries separated and most of the region returned to Bolivian control.

The discovery of rubber tree groves in the region in the mid-19th century attracted numerous immigrants, especially from Brazil and Europe, seeking to build on the rubber boom. Despite the increased numbers of Brazilians, the Treaty of Ayacucho (1867) determined that the region belonged to Bolivia. By 1877, Acre's population was composed almost entirely of Brazilians coming from the Northeast.

=== Brazilian acquisition ===
In 1899, Brazilian settlers in Acre declared an independent state known as the Republic of Acre. Bolivia attempted to reassert control, but Brazilian resistance led to armed clashes, culminating in the Acre War. On 17 November 1903, the Treaty of Petrópolis was signed, transferring final possession of the region to Brazil. Acre was incorporated as a Brazilian territory divided into three departments. Brazil acquired the land for two million pounds sterling, with the territory taken from Mato Grosso under terms that also facilitated the construction of the Madeira-Mamoré railway.

Once the Acre War was over, Peru did not recognize the annexation of Acre until 1909, with the Velarde-Río Branco Treaty, where the borders between Peru and Brazil were defined. It was signed in Rio de Janeiro, on September 8, 1909, by the Minister of Foreign Affairs of Brazil, Baron of Rio Branco, and the plenipotentiary minister of Peru in Brazil, Hernán Velarde, by President Augusto B. Leguía (first government) then ruled in Peru, and in Brazil by the president Nilo Pecanha, in order to solve the border problems between Peru and Brazil.

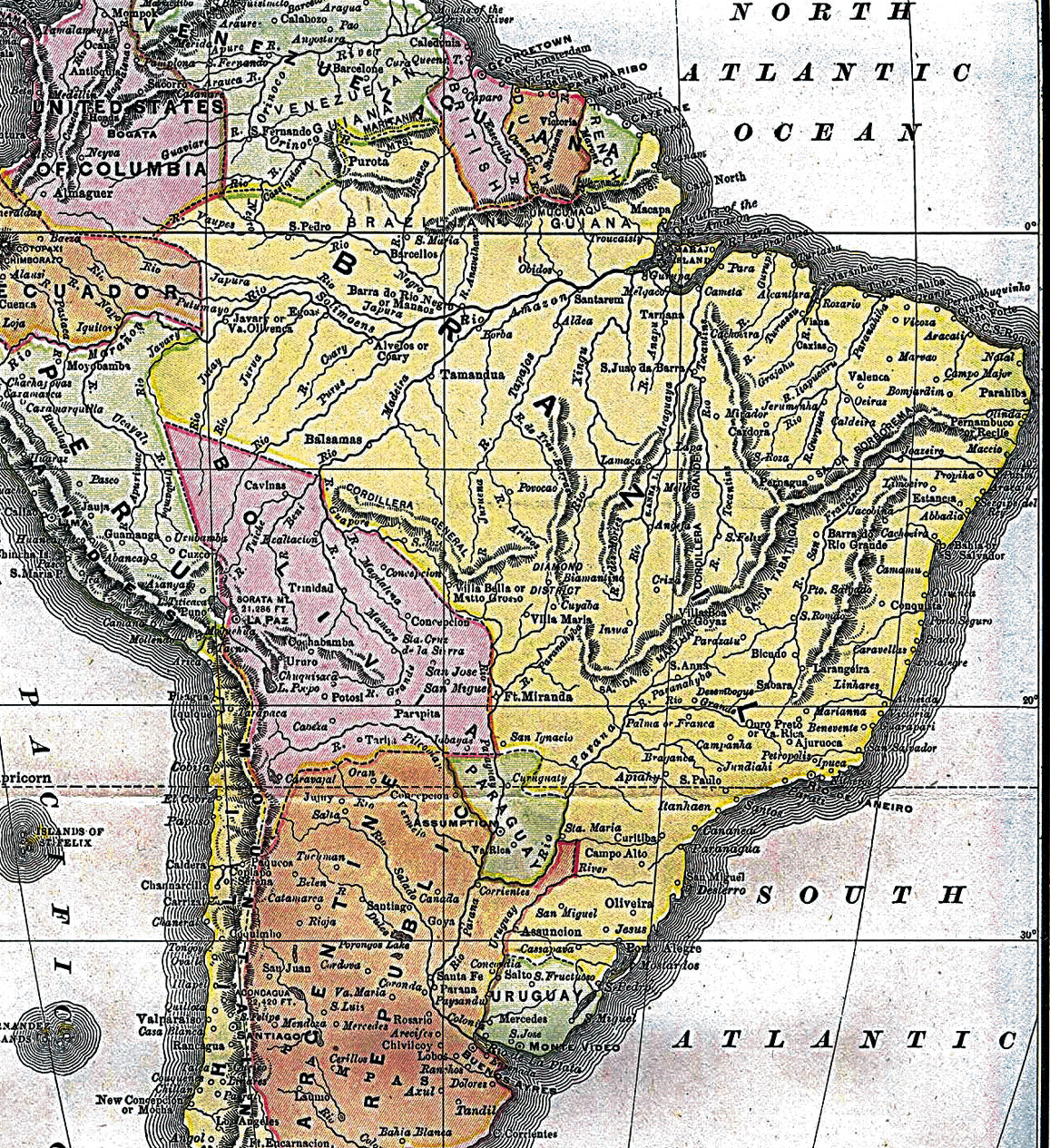
Map of Brazil during República Velha, 1892. Note the differences from current western borders in the areas of Pantanal and the Amazon basin — including the lack of Acre's territory, then still part of Bolivia

Acre was united in 1920. On June 15, 1962, it was elevated to the category of state, and was the first to be governed by a woman, Iolanda Fleming, a teacher. During the early twentieth century, rubber seedlings were taken to Southeast Asia, where competitive plantations were established, reducing the importance of the Amazon in production. During the Second World War, Japanese forces took over the rubber tree groves of British Malaya.

Acre was called on to produce rubber for the Allied war effort. The Rubber Soldiers, natives mostly of the Ceará plantation, increased production and provided critical supplies to the Allies. Acre's decisive contribution to the Allied victory may have helped Brazil attract North American investment to form the National Steel Company (Companhia Siderúrgica Nacional) in the postwar era. This company aided in the industrialization of the Central-south, which did not yet possess basic heavy industries.

On April 4, 2008, Acre won a judicial debate with the state of Amazonas in relation to the dispute surrounding the Cunha Gomes Line. It annexed part of the municipalities of Envira, Guajará, Boca do Acre, Pauini, Eirunepé and Ipixuna. The territorial redefinition consolidated the incorporation of 1.2 million hectares of the Liberdade, Gregório, and Mogno forest complex to the territory of Acre, which corresponds to 11,583.87 km^{2} (4,472.56 sq mi).

==== Initial settlement ====
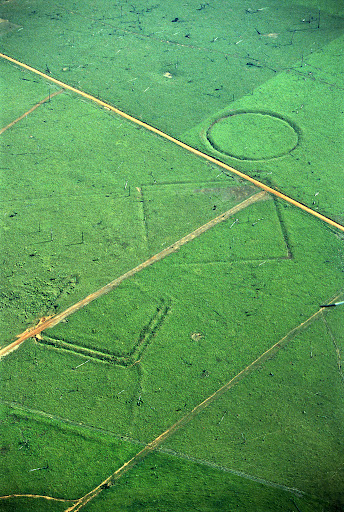
Geoglyphs in the Amazon rainforest, Acre

Since the 1970s, numerous geoglyphs, major geometric earthworks, have been discovered on deforested land in Acre, and dated to between 1–1250 AD. These are cited as evidence of complex Pre-Columbian societies. The BBC's Unnatural Histories explored studies of this area, concluding that the Amazon rainforest, rather than being a pristine "wilderness", has been shaped by man for at least 11,000 years. Traditional ancient practices included forest gardening. Ondemar Dias is credited as the first to discover the geoglyphs in 1977. Alceu Ranzi expanded their findings by flying over Acre.

During the 17th century, Portuguese expeditions reached many of the far ends of present-day Brazil. The expansion of the exploration to the west followed, and they reached lands under control by the Spanish colonies. The two nations negotiated to establish their territories, under the Treaties of Madrid (1750) and San Ildefonso (1777). Both of the treaties were based on the explorations of Portuguese bandeirante Manoel Félix de Lima of the Guaporé and Madeira river basins. The treaties established the riverbeds of the Mamoré and Guaporé to their maximum western limits on the left bank of the Javari as the border between the Spanish and Portuguese territories.

The Portuguese created the new royal captaincy of Mato Grosso (1751), stimulating settlement toward the frontier. New centers developed: Vila Bela (1752) on the banks of the Guaporé, Vila Maria (1778) on the Paraguay River, and Casalvasco (1783). Until the mid-19th century, there was little effort to settle the area systematically. At that time, the great virgin source of rubber attracted commercial interest, and development followed.

The empire was directed towards agricultural exports, based on coffee as the most important commodity. The territories of the extreme west were unknown and usually overlooked. For example, although Cândido Mendes de Almeida's Atlas of the Empire of Brazil (1868), was considered a model of its time, geographers knew nothing of the Acre River and its principal tributaries, which did not appear at all in the atlas.

Some few armed bands of Brazilian explorers exploited the rural and unpopulated region, not knowing and little interested in whether they were "controlled" by Brazil, Peru, or Bolivia.

But the rubber boom of the mid-19th century, stimulated exploration by various expeditions to survey this resource and develop a plan for colonial settlement. At that time, João Rodrigues Cametá initiated the conquest of the Purús River; Manuel Urbano da Encarnação, an Indian with extensive knowledge of the region, reached the Acre River, traveling up it as far as the vicinity of the Xapuri; and João da Cunha Correia reached the drainage basin of the upper Tarauacá. For the most part, these expeditions took place on Bolivian land.

Exploitative activities, the industrial importance of the rubber reserves, and the penetration of Brazilian colonists in the region raised the attention of Bolivia, which solicited a better fixation of boundaries. After much failed negotiation, in 1867 the Treaty of Ayacucho was signed, which recognized the colonial uti possidetis, or use of that territory by Brazil. A border was established parallel to the confluence of the Beni and Mamoré rivers, running eastward to the headwaters of the Javari River, even though the source of this river was not yet known.

==== Northeast occupation ====
As the price of rubber rose in the market, the demand for it grew. The race to the Amazon increased. Plantations multiplied in the valleys of the Acre, Purús and, farther west, the Tarauacá. In the year 1873–1874, in the drainage basin of the Purús, the population rose from around one thousand to four thousand inhabitants. The Brazilian imperial government, already sensitive to the resulting offerings of rubber, considered the entire valley of the Purús to be Brazilian.

In the second half of the 19th century, disturbances were registered in the demographic and geo-economic balance of the empire. The coffee boom in the south attracted financial resources and workers, to detriment of the northeast. The growing impoverishment of that region stimulated migratory waves to the states of Rio de Janeiro, Minas Gerais, and São Paulo. The movement of population became particularly active during the prolonged drought of the northeastern interior, from 1877 to 1880. Hundreds of Ceará indigenous people headed for the rubber plantations in search of work.

The Cearense migration reached the banks of the Juruá and accelerated the occupation of land which Bolivia would later reclaim. The great fluvial rivers and their tributary systems were full of small ship fleets transporting colonists, goods, and supply material to the most isolated centers. The governments of Amazonas and Pará quickly established supply houses, which financed various types of operations, guaranteed credit, and promoted the commercial incentive of the rubber tree groves.

The rubber race had the frantic urgency of gold rushes of the 18th century. The situation drew the attention of the government to the economic use and development of an almost completely unknown area. The activities of private businesses would enable the government to incorporate the new region.

==== Land dispute ====
In 1890, José Manuel Pando, a Bolivian official, alerted his government to the fact that more than three hundred rubber plantations had been developed in the Jura basin, and most were occupied by Brazilians on what was nominally Bolivian territory. The Brazilian penetration had advanced west from the 64th meridian to beyond the 72nd, in an extension of one thousand kilometers, despite the borders having been established. The Treaty of 1867 limited Brazil to land above the confluence of the Beni and Mamoré rivers.

In 1895 a new commission to define the borders was created. The Brazilian representative, Gregório Taumaturgo de Azevedo, resigned after verifying that the ratification of the Treaty of 1867 would harm the Brazilian rubber gatherers already settled in Bolivian territory. In 1899, the Bolivians established an administrative post in Puerto Alonso, exacting taxes and customs duties upon Brazilian activities. The following year, Brazil accepted the sovereignty of Bolivia in the zone, when it officially recognized the old boundaries at the confluence of the Beni and Mamoré rivers.

Distant from the diplomatic process, the rubber workers judged their interests to have been cheated, and initiated insurrection movements. Some of this was in response to brutal treatment and abuse by forces managed by the major rubber companies. In the same year that Bolivia established administration in Puerto Alonso (1899), two serious uprisings occurred.

In April, a Cearense lawyer, José Carvalho, led an armed movement, which culminated in the expulsion of the Bolivian authorities. Shortly thereafter, Bolivia began negotiations with an Anglo-American trust, the Bolivian Syndicate, in order to promote, with exceptional force (exacting of taxes, armed force), the political and economic incorporation of Acre into its territory. The governor of Amazonas, Ramalho Júnior, informed of the agreement by a functionary of the Bolivian consulate in Belém, Luis Gálvez Rodríguez de Arias, sent military contingents forward to occupy Puerto Alonso. Gálvez proclaimed the independence of Acre, in the form of a republic. He became its president with the acquiescence of the rubber gatherers. Under protests from Bolivia, President Campos Sales abolished the ephemeral republic (March 1900).

Bolivians, reinstated in the region, suffered in 1900 from the assault of the so-called Floriano Peixoto expedition, or "expedition of the poets". It was made up of intellectual bohemians from Manaus. Following brief fighting in the area surrounding Puerto Alonso, the expedition was completely scattered. Ultimately, the Bolivian government signed a contract with the Bolivian Syndicate (July 1901). The Brazilian congress, shocked by the arbitrariness of the act, took measures, canceling commercial accords and navigation between the two countries, and suspending the right of travel to Bolivia.

At the same time, Brazilians organized a large armed assault on the disputed area. The operations were led by a former student of the Military School of Rio Grande do Sul (Escola Militar do Rio Grande do Sul), José Plácido de Castro. The rubber gatherers occupied the village of Xapuri in Alto Acre (August 1902), and took Bolivian officials into custody. Finally, Plácido de Castro's forces besieged Puerto Alonso, proclaiming the Independent State of Acre, after the capitulation of Bolivian troops (February 1903).

==== Diplomatic intervention ====
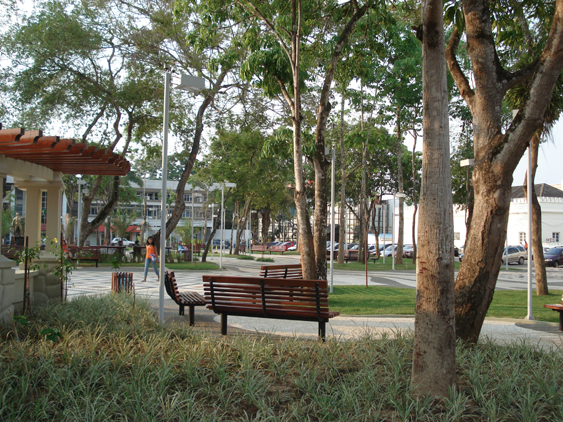
Revolução Square (Praça Plácido de Castro) in the capital, Rio Branco

José Plácido de Castro was proclaimed governor of the new Independent State of Acre, and he had to discuss the question of borders in the diplomatic sphere. The Baron of Rio Branco, who had just assumed the role of Brazil's Minister of External Relations, immediately opened channels which were meant to have put an end to the question.

The simplest problem, with the Bolivian Syndicate, was resolved by Brazil paying one hundred and ten thousand pounds to renounce the contract (February 1903). Next, commercial relations were reestablished with Bolivia, while a part of the territory on the upper Purús and Juruá, militarily occupied in March 1903, was declared litigious.

Bolivia finally agreed to cede to Brazil an area of 142,800 km^{2} (55,100 sq mi), in exchange for two million pounds sterling, paid in two installments. Brazil committed to the construction of a Madeira-Mamoré Railway, connecting Porto Velho to Guajará-Mirim, at the confluence of the Beni and Madeira rivers. These actions were ratified in the Treaty of Petrópolis (November 17, 1903), through which Brazil acquired the future territory, now state of Acre.

Peru had also claimed sovereignty over the entire territory of Acre and part of the state of Amazonas, based on historic colonial titles. After armed conflicts between Brazilians and Peruvians on the upper Purús and Juruá, a joint administration was established in those regions (1904). The studies to determine the borders proceeded until the end of 1909, when a treaty was signed that completed the political integration of Acre into Brazilian territory.

==== Development from territory to statehood ====
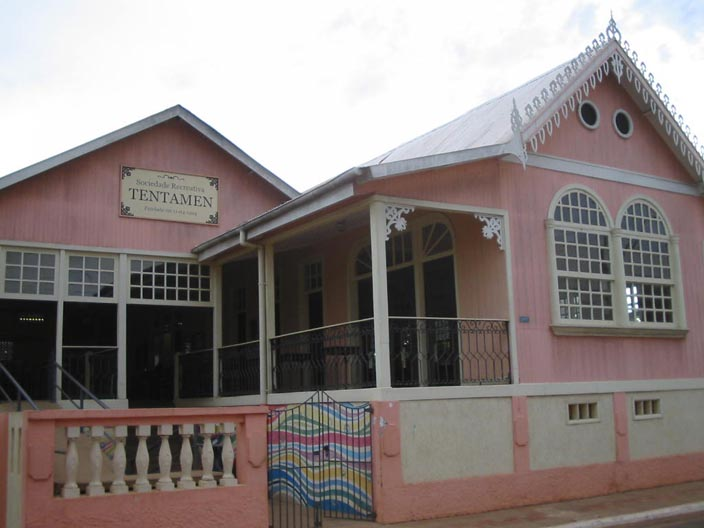
The Sociedade Recreativa Tentâmen, in Rio Branco, built in 1924, with Rural Gothic architecture, was, for many years, a symbol of Acre's bohemia, a reflection of the prosperous years from the rubber cycle

Exercising a prominent role in national exports until 1913, when rubber was introduced to European and North American markets, Acre enjoyed a period of great prosperity. At the start of the 20th century, in a period of less than ten years, it grew to have more than 50,000 inhabitants.

From 1946 on, the federal government undertook actions to revive the economy of the Amazon Basin, and to include it in regional development projects.

Attending to the judicial arrangements of the Treaty of Petrópolis, President Rodrigues Alves sanctioned the law which created the Territory of Acre (1904), further dividing it into three departments: Alto Acre, Alto Purús, and Alto Juruá, the latter being separated to form Alto Tarauacá (1912). The departmental administration was exercised until 1921 by mayors appointed by the President of Brazil. At that time the arrangements were altered, passing the administration to a governor. The second Constitution of Brazil (1934) conceded to Acre the right to elect representatives to the National Congress of Brazil.

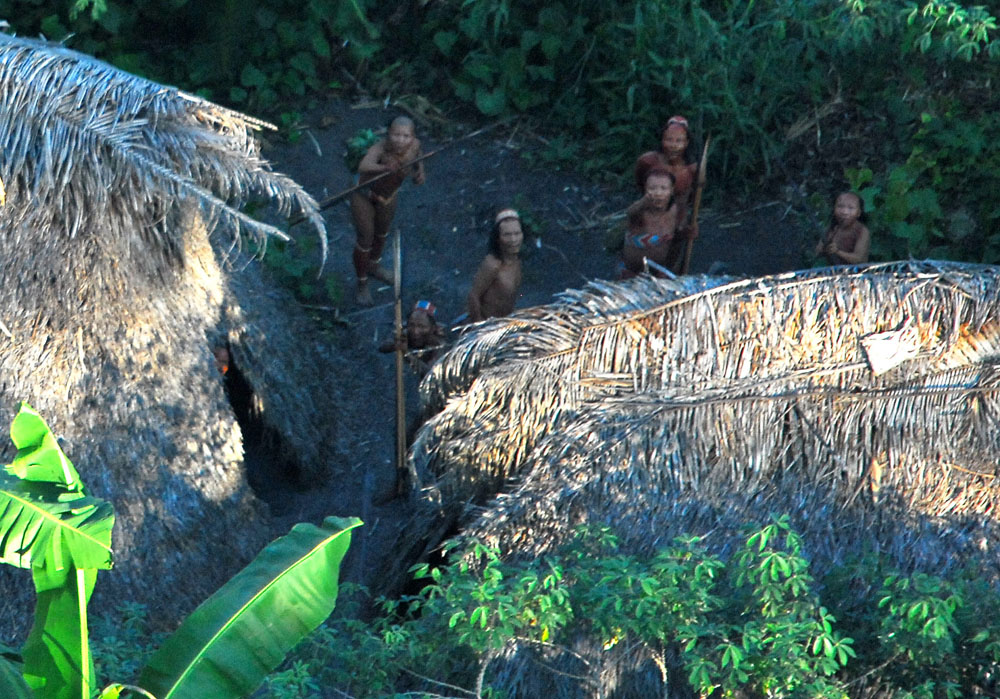
Members of an uncontacted tribe encountered in 2008, at the Brazil–Peru border

During the Estado Novo (New State) political ideas involving the valorization of the interior took hold, with the intention of promoting the articulation of more isolated areas. Thereafter, the vote of 1946 commended the channeling of budgetary resources from the Union to the Amazon, determining that the Territory of Acre would be elevated to the condition of state as soon as its revenue reached the equivalent of the lowest state tax exaction.

In the 1960s, the second cycle of efforts to accelerate the progress of the Amazon area was begun with the Superintendency of the Development of the Amazon (Superintendência do Desenvolvimento da Amazônia or SUDAM, 1966). Better networking of regional sub-sectors within the state was sought out, thus connecting the branch lines of the Transamazônica, which connected Rio Branco and Brasiléia, on the upper course of the Acre River, and Cruzeiro do Sul, on the banks of the Juruá, crossing the valleys of the Purús and the Tarauacá. Planning politics developed, therefore, destined to correct the demographic, economic, and political distortions of national integration.

== Demographics ==
Racial groups of Acre (2022 census)
1. Multiracial (66.2%)
2. White (21.4%)
3. Black (8.56%)
4. Indigenous (3.51%)
5. East Asian (0.24%)

According to the IBGE of 2022, there were 830,018 people residing in the state. making Acre the third least populated state. The population density was 4.5 inh./km^{2}.

Urbanization: 69.6% (2006); Population growth: 3.3% (1991–2000); Houses: 162,000 (2006).

The last Census in 2022 revealed the following numbers: 549,889 Brown (Multiracial) people (66.3%), 177,992 White (21.4%), 71,086 Black (8.6%), 29,163 Amerindian people (3.5%).

=== Religion ===
As of 2022, Acre is one of two states in Brazil where Protestants outnumber Catholics.

Religious makeup of Acre (2022 census)
1. Protestant (44.4%)
2. Roman Catholic (38.9%)
3. No religion (11.2%)
4. Other (5.49%)
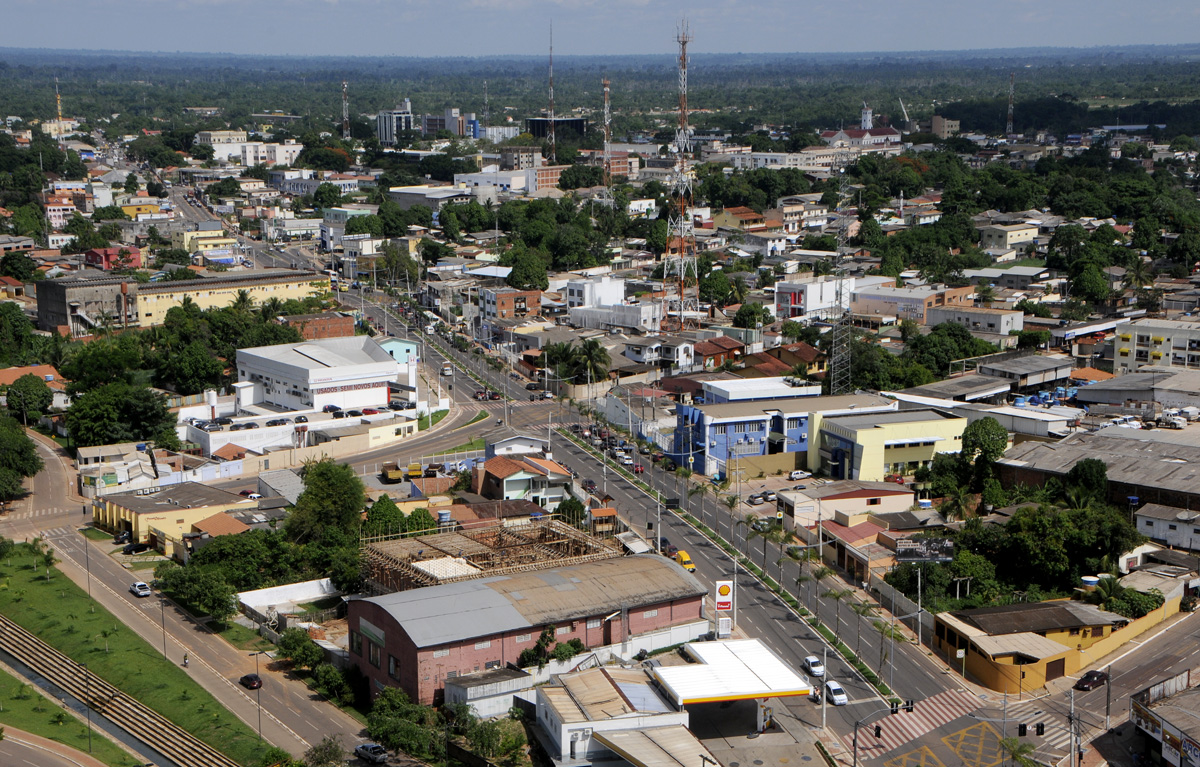
Rio Branco in the afternoon

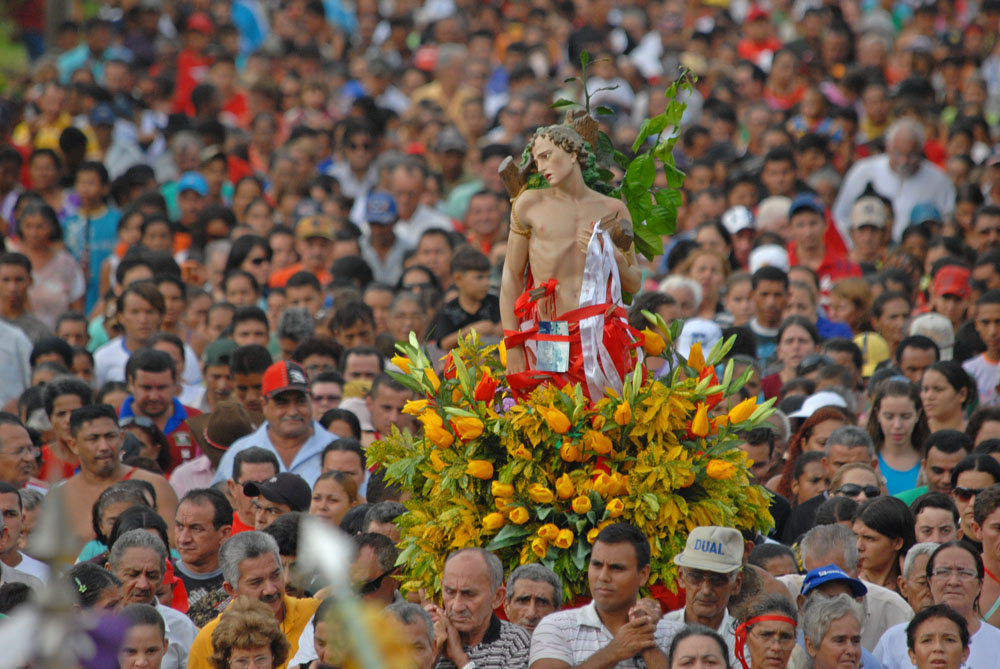
Saint Sebastian Festivities in Xapuri

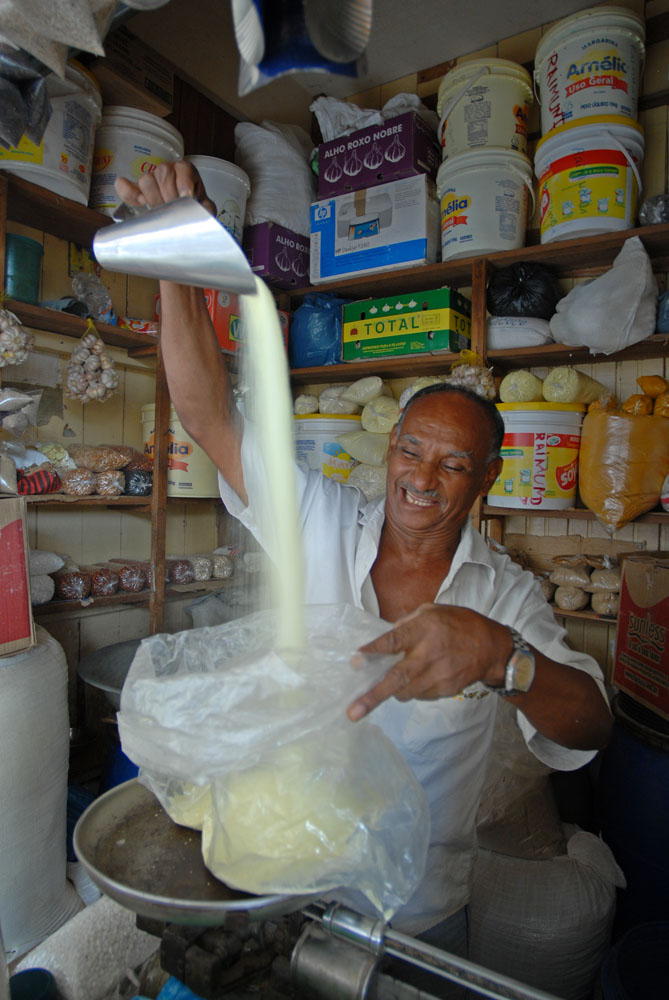
A seller of the nationally renowned and appreciated Cruzeiro do Sul cassava flour

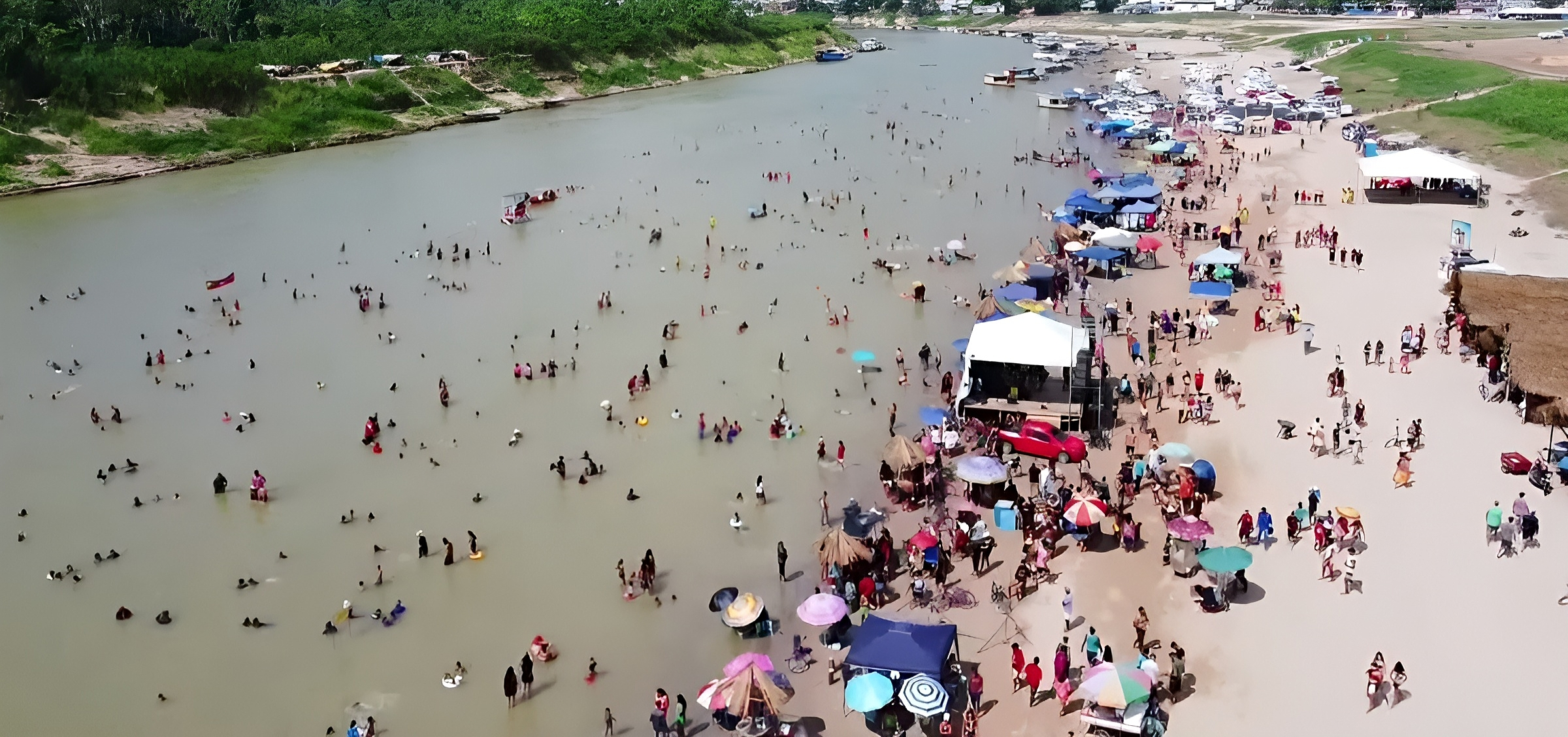
Beach & Açaí Festival of Feijó, Acre

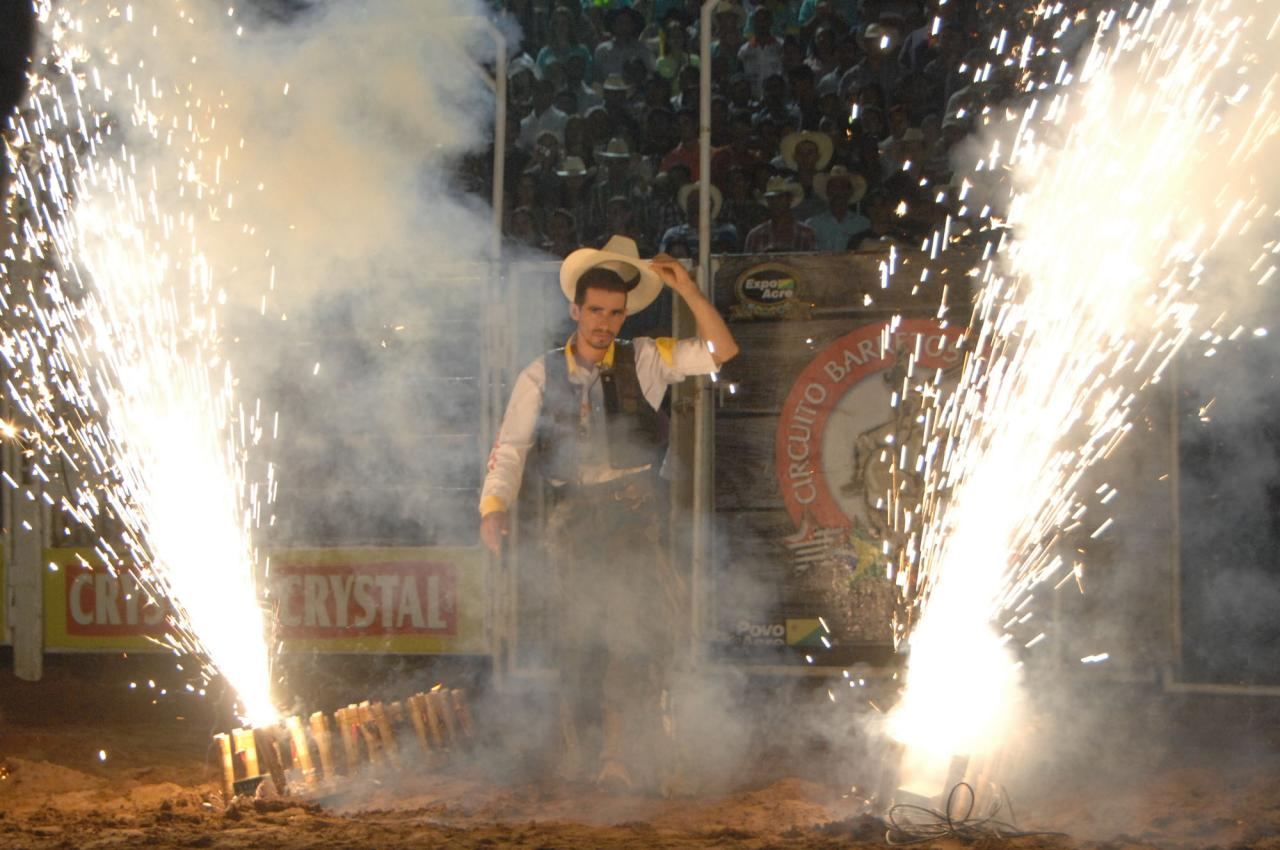
Opening ceremony of the ExpoAcre Field Day

=== Largest cities ===
Largest cities or towns in Acre (state) (2010 census by the Brazilian Institute of Geography and Statistics)
Rank		Mesoregion	Pop.	Rank		Mesoregion	Pop.
1	Rio Branco	Vale do Acre	335,796	11	Epitaciolândia	Vale do Acre	15,126
2	Cruzeiro do Sul	Vale do Juruá	78,444	12	Porto Acre	Vale do Acre	14,806
3	Sena Madureira	Vale do Acre	37,993	13	Rodrigues Alves	Vale do Juruá	14,334
4	Tarauacá	Vale do Juruá	35,526	14	Marechal Thaumaturgo	Vale do Juruá	14,200
5	Feijó	Vale do Juruá	32,311	15	Acrelândia	Vale do Acre	12,538
6	Brasiléia	Vale do Acre	21,438	16	Porto Walter	Vale do Juruá	9,172
7	Senador Guiomard	Vale do Acre	20,153	17	Capixaba, Acre	Vale do Acre	8,810
8	Plácido de Castro	Vale do Acre	17,203	18	Bujari	Vale do Acre	8,474
9	Xapuri	Vale do Acre	16,016	19	Manoel Urbano	Vale do Acre	7,989
10	Mâncio Lima	Vale do Juruá	15,246	20	Jordão	Vale do Juruá	6,531

Historical population
Year	Pop.	±%
1920	92,379	—
1940	79,768	−13.7%
1950	114,755	+43.9%
1960	160,208	+39.6%
1970	218,006	+36.1%
1980	306,893	+40.8%
1991	417,165	+35.9%
2000	557,882	+33.7%
2010	733,559	+31.5%
2022	830,018	+13.1%

=== Education ===
Portuguese is the official national language, and thus the primary language taught in schools. English and Spanish are also part of the official high school curriculum.

==== Educational institutions ====
- Universidade Federal do Acre (Ufac) (Federal University of Acre);
- Faculdade da Amazônia Ocidental (Faao) (College of Western Amazon);
- Faculdade de Ciências Jurídicas e Sociais Applicadas Rio Branco (Firb);
- Instituto de Educação, Ciência e Tecnologia do Vale do Juruá (Ieval);
- Instituto de Ensino Superior do Acre (Iesacre);
- União Educacional do Norte (Uninorte).

== Economy ==
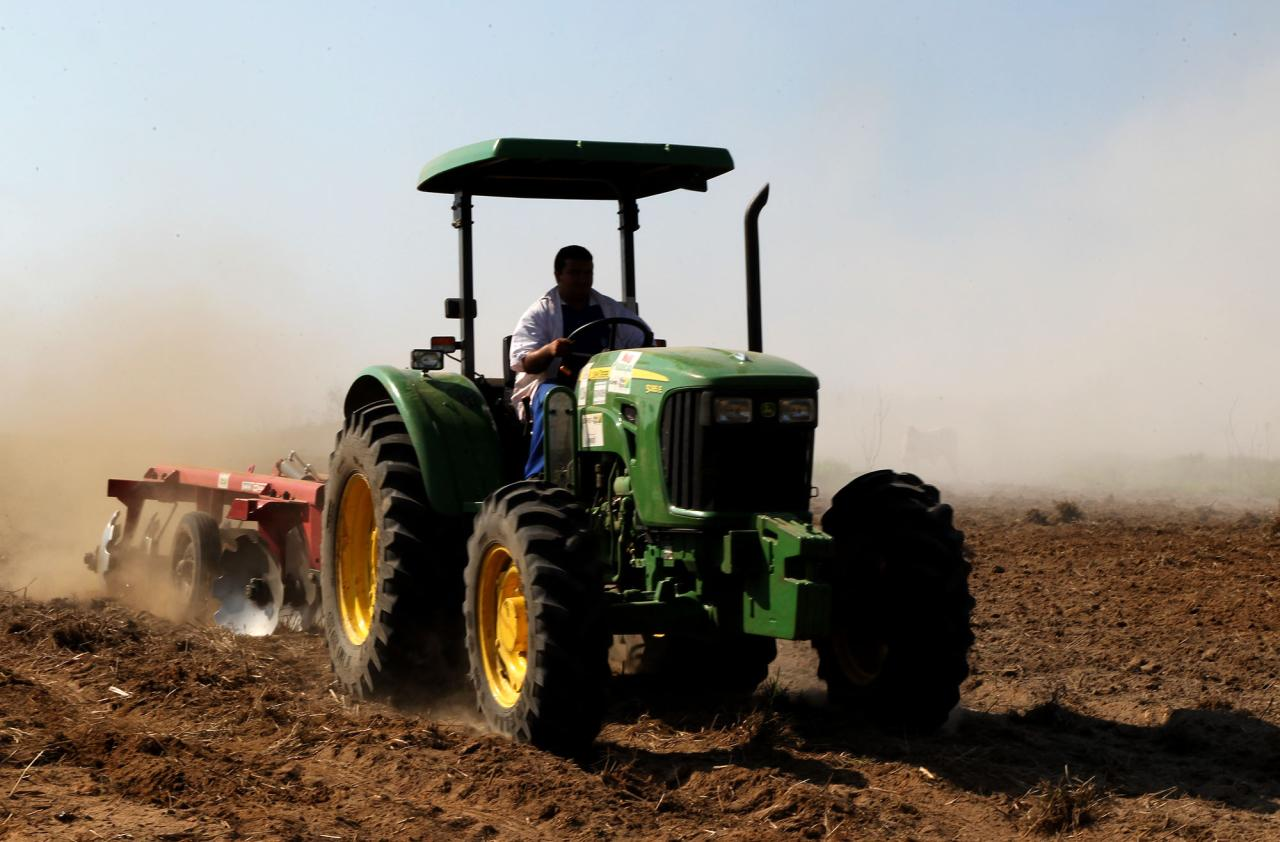
Agriculture in Mâncio Lima

The service sector is the largest component of GDP at 66%, followed by the industrial sector at 28.1%. Agriculture represents 5.9%, of GDP (2004). Acre exports: wood 85.6%, poultry (chicken and wild turkey) 4.7%, wood products 1.7% (2002).

Share of the Brazilian economy: 0.2% (2005).

== Infrastructure ==
=== Airports ===
- Rio Branco

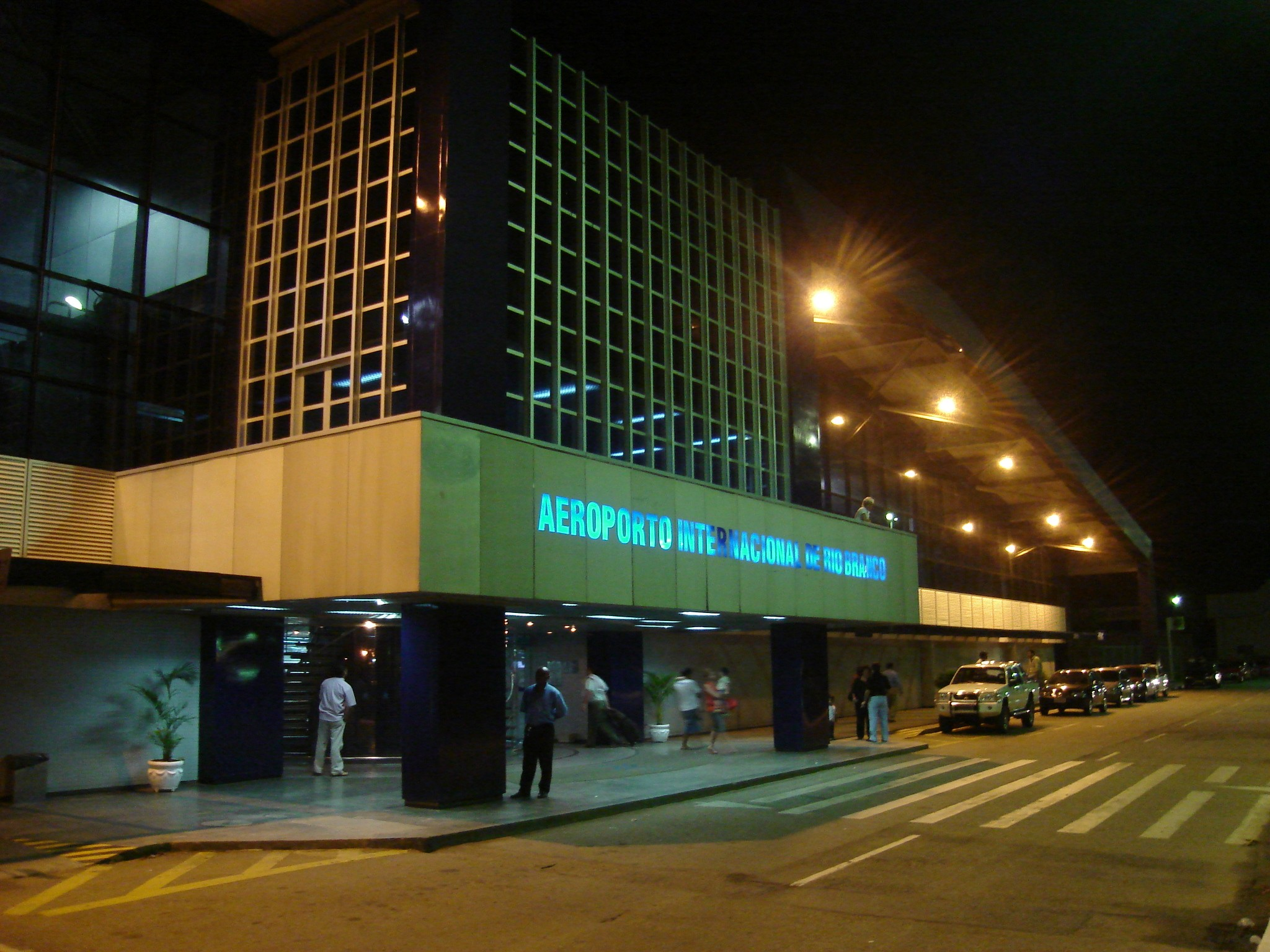
Rio Branco International Airport

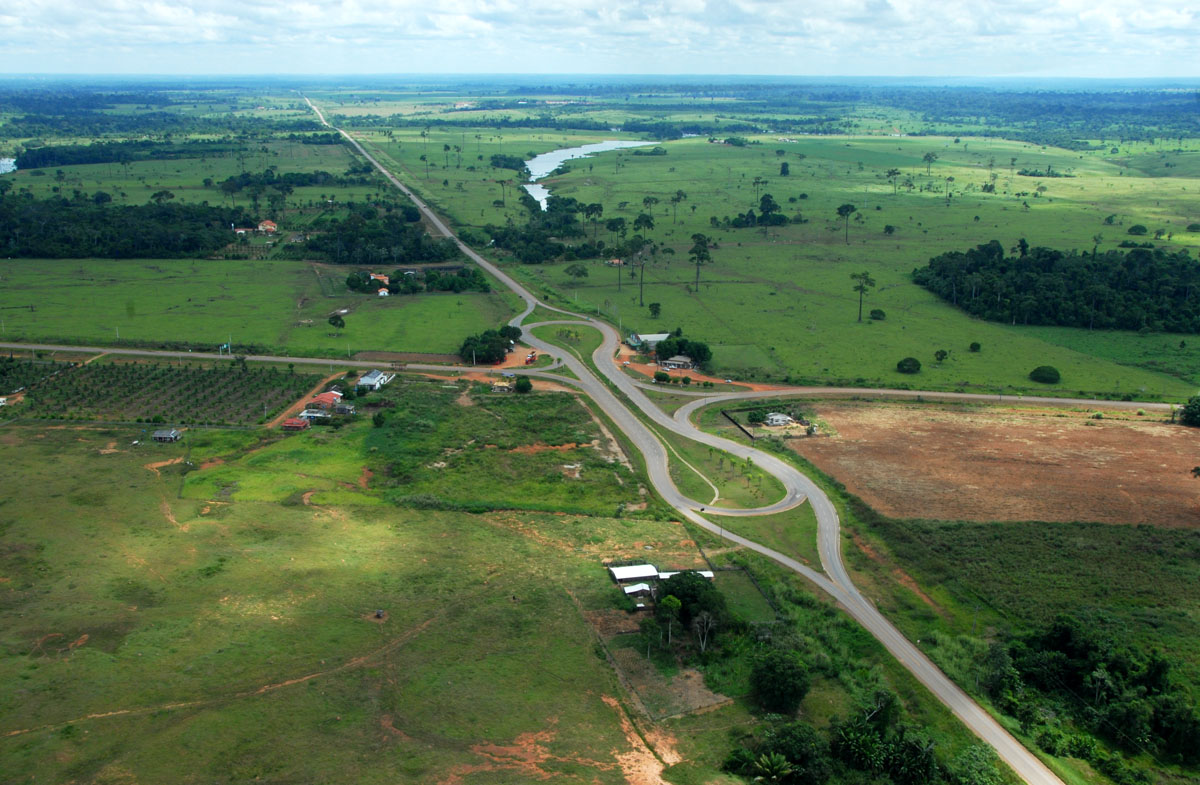
Intersection of the BR-364 and the Interoceanic Highway in Senador Guiomard, Greater Rio Branco

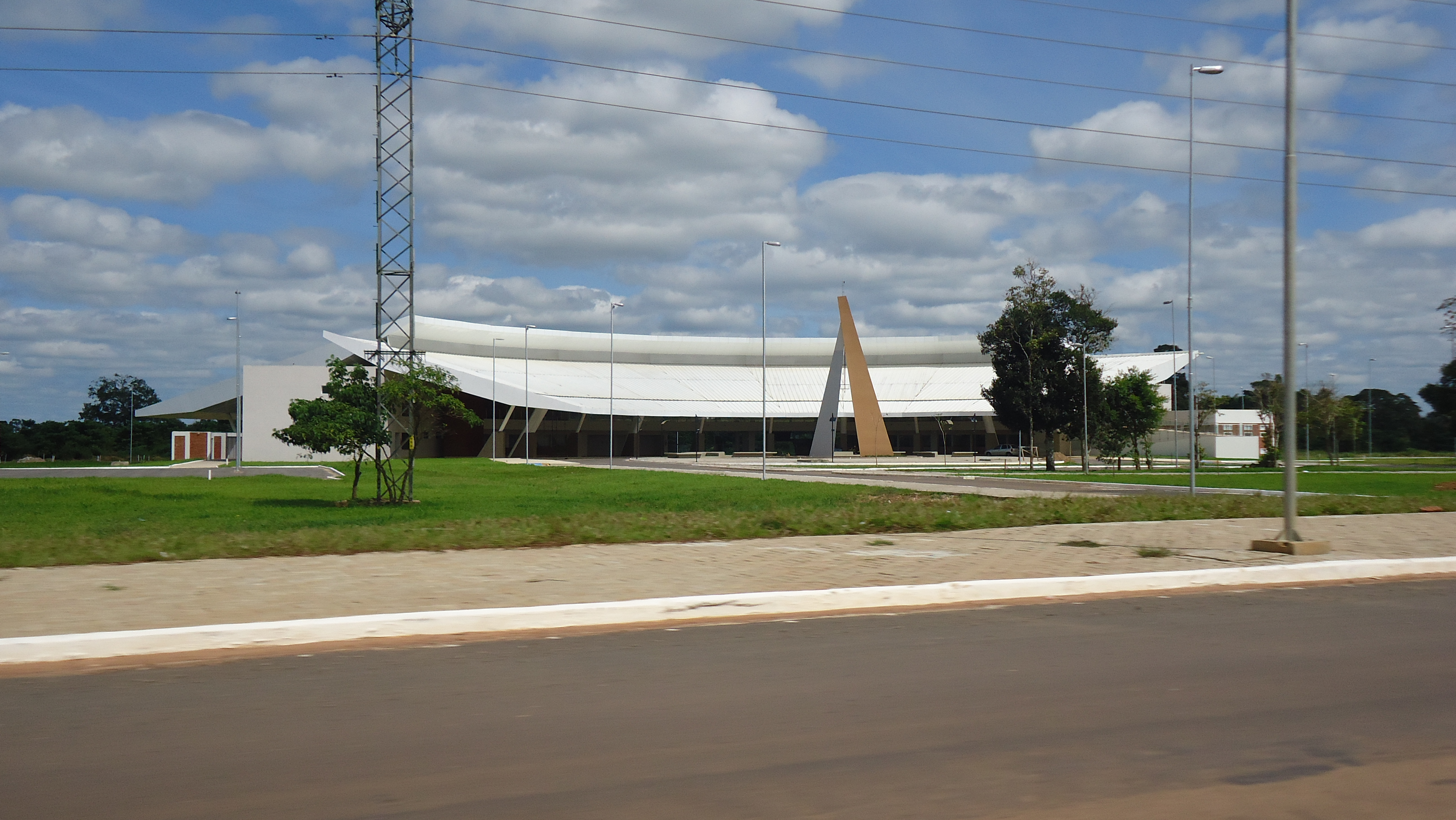
Rio Branco International Bus Station

Rio Branco International Airport is located in a rural zone of the municipality of Rio Branco, in the state of Acre. It was opened on November 2, 1999, with a unique characteristic: it moved 22 kilometers away from the previous airport site. Rio Branco Airport serves domestic and international flights (by scheduled carriers and air taxi firms) along with general and military aviation. The terminal can receive 270 thousand passengers a year and serves an average of 14 daily operations.

- Cruzeiro do Sul

Cruzeiro do Sul International Airport is located 18 kilometers away from the city center, which helps access to the Alto Juruá region. It was opened on October 28, 1970, and absorbed by Infraero on March 31, 1980. The airport infrastructure was built in 1976 by the municipal government. In 1994, the runway was completely renovated.

There are domestic airports at Tarauacá, Sena Madureira and Brasiléia.

=== Highways ===
- BR-364 (Rio Branco to Southeastern Brazil);
- BR-317 (Rio Branco to south of Acre);
- AC-040 (Rio Branco to Plácido de Castro);
- AC-401 (Plácido de Castro to Acrelândia);
- AC-010 (Rio Branco to Porto Acre).

Two roads to Peru:

- at Boqueirão
- BR-317 from Assis Brasil to Highway 30C to Iñapari and Highway 26 to Cuzco.

Three roads to Bolivia:

- from Rio Branco at Plácido de Castro,
- from Rio Branco to Santa Rosa,
- from BR-317 in Brasileia to Ruta 13 in Cobija.

Three roads (interstates) to Amazonas:

- Rio Branco — Boca do Acre
- Feijó — Envira
- Cruzeiro do Sul — Guajará

One road to Southeastern Brazil:

- BR-364

== Sports ==
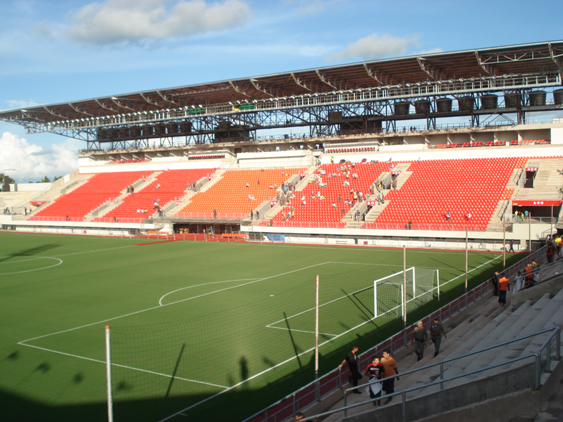
Arena da Floresta stadium in Rio Branco

Rio Branco provides visitors and residents with various sport activities.

=== Stadiums ===
- Arena da Floresta stadium;
- José de Melo stadium;
- Federação Acreana de Futebol stadium;
- Dom Giocondo Maria Grotti stadium;
- Adauto de Brito stadium;
- and many others.

The Arena da Floresta stadium in Rio Branco was one of the 18 candidates to host games in the 2014 FIFA World Cup, which was held in Brazil, but did not make it to the final 12 chosen.

== Culture ==
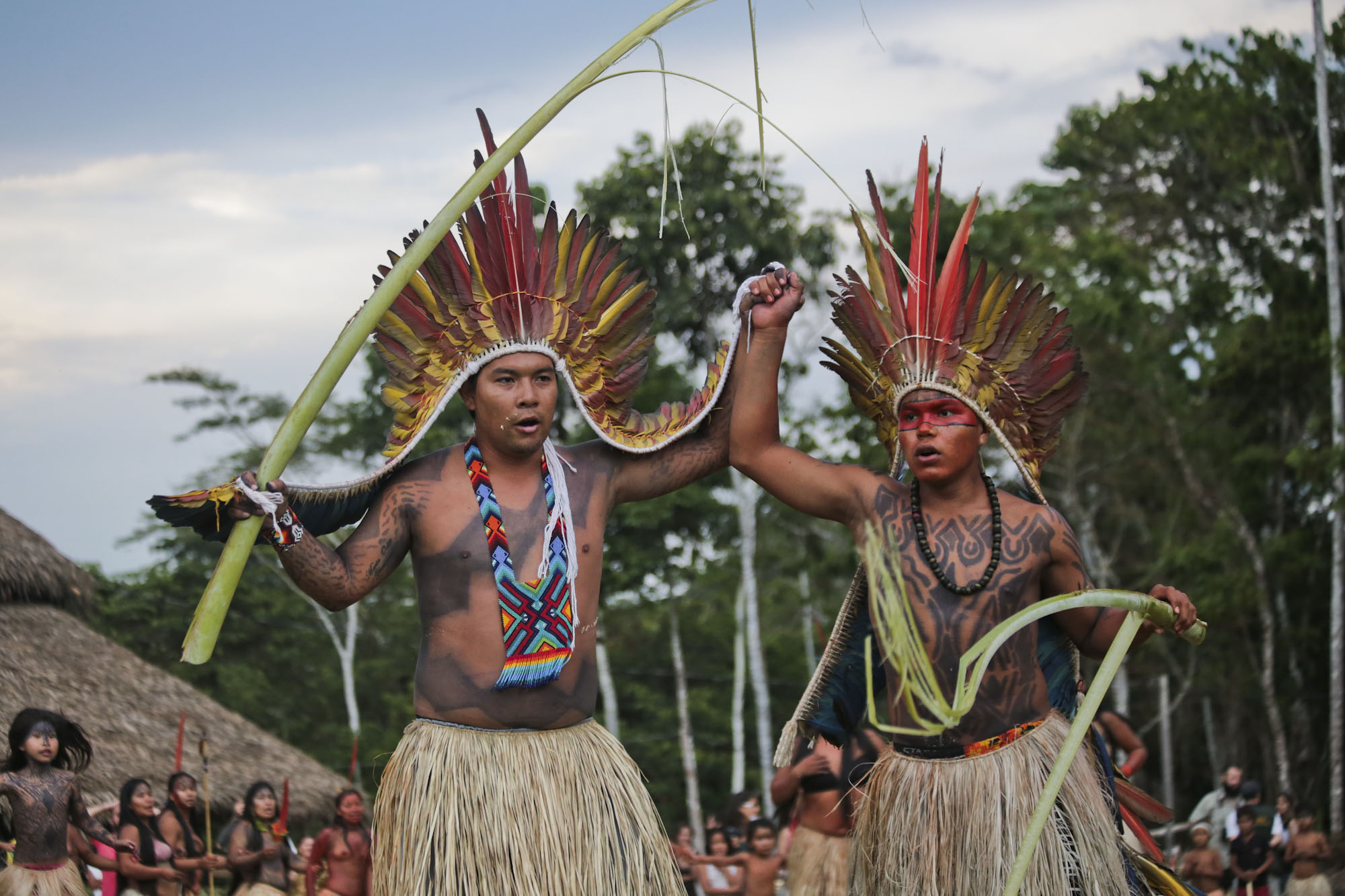
Yawa festival in Tarauacá

Despite gaining statehood through war, Acre's culture is close to that of other Northern Brazilian states, alongside a high affinity for Northeastern Brazilian culture.

In Rio Branco, there is a religious community of typical Acre indigenous origin, called Alto Santo (Universal Christian Enlightenment Center) that practices the Santo Daime Ritual with Daime, a natural tea made with leaves and vines, which indigenous tradition understands as a way of approaching God. The ritual involves drinking the tea, wearing uniforms, and singing hymnals.

The best-known dish consumed by Acreans is called Baixaria, which combines duck, tucupi, cassava flour and pirarucu fish with a wide variety of Amazonian fruits traditionally consumed by Acre's Indigenous peoples.

Some famous people from Acre include João Donato, Sansão Campos Pereira, Chico Mendes, Sergio Souto and Tião Natureza.

== Flag ==
The flag was adopted on March 15, 1921. It is a variation of the flags used by the secessionist state of Acre, with the yellow and green parts exchanged and mirrored. The yellow color symbolizes peace, green hope, and the star symbolizes the light which guided those who worked to make Acre a state of Brazil.

== See also ==
- Acre conspiracy
- Amazon rubber cycle
- List of rivers of Acre
- List of municipalities in Acre
- List of governors of Acre
