= Baixaria =

Brazilian meal popular in Acre

- Course: Main course
- Place of origin: Brazil
- Region or state: Acre
- Associated cuisine: Brazilian cuisine

Baixaria (lit. 'disorder, mess') is a meal from the Brazilian state of Acre that consists of cuscuz, ground beef, and a runny fried egg. The dish is sometimes served with tomato, onion, and cheiro-verde. The dish is popular throughout the state and is typically served at restaurants and markets at breakfast and dinner. It is well known for its heartiness.

== Origin ==
Baixaria in Brazilian Portuguese is a term that refers to a disagreement or conflict between multiple people. In slang, the term is used to refer to a messy situation or messes, in general.

While the origin of Baixaria is unknown, there are several theories as to how it was created. According to journalist Alexandre Nunes, the name of the dish came from a vendor trying to convince drunk patrons that a group of well dressed strangers were referring to a dish rather than the arrival of the patrons when they said "Here comes the baixaria (confusion, disorder)". Another story explains that the dish has had various names, but the name Baixaria stuck in the 1980s when journalist Wilson Barros wrote about a then new dish with this name. Another tale tells of a famished vaqueiro who inadvertently created the dish when he ordered a meal that had everything the restaurant had to offer and then later asked how much was the bill for the Baixaria (mess) that he ate.
