= Guajará =

Municipality of Amazonas, Brazil

- Municipality
- Flag

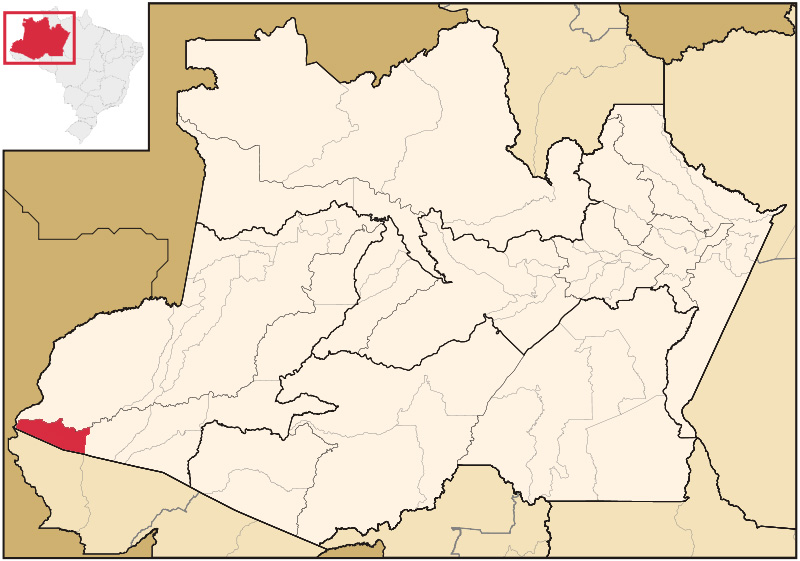
- Location of the municipality inside Amazonas

- Location in Brazil
- Coordinates: 7°32′45″S 72°35′2″W
- Country: Brazil
- Region: North
- State: Amazonas

Population (2020)
  - Total: 16,937
- Time zone: UTC−4 (AMT)

Guajará (Guanjeras) is a municipality located in the Brazilian state of Amazonas. Its population was 16,937 in 2020 and its area is 8,904 km^{2}.
