= Piabanha River =

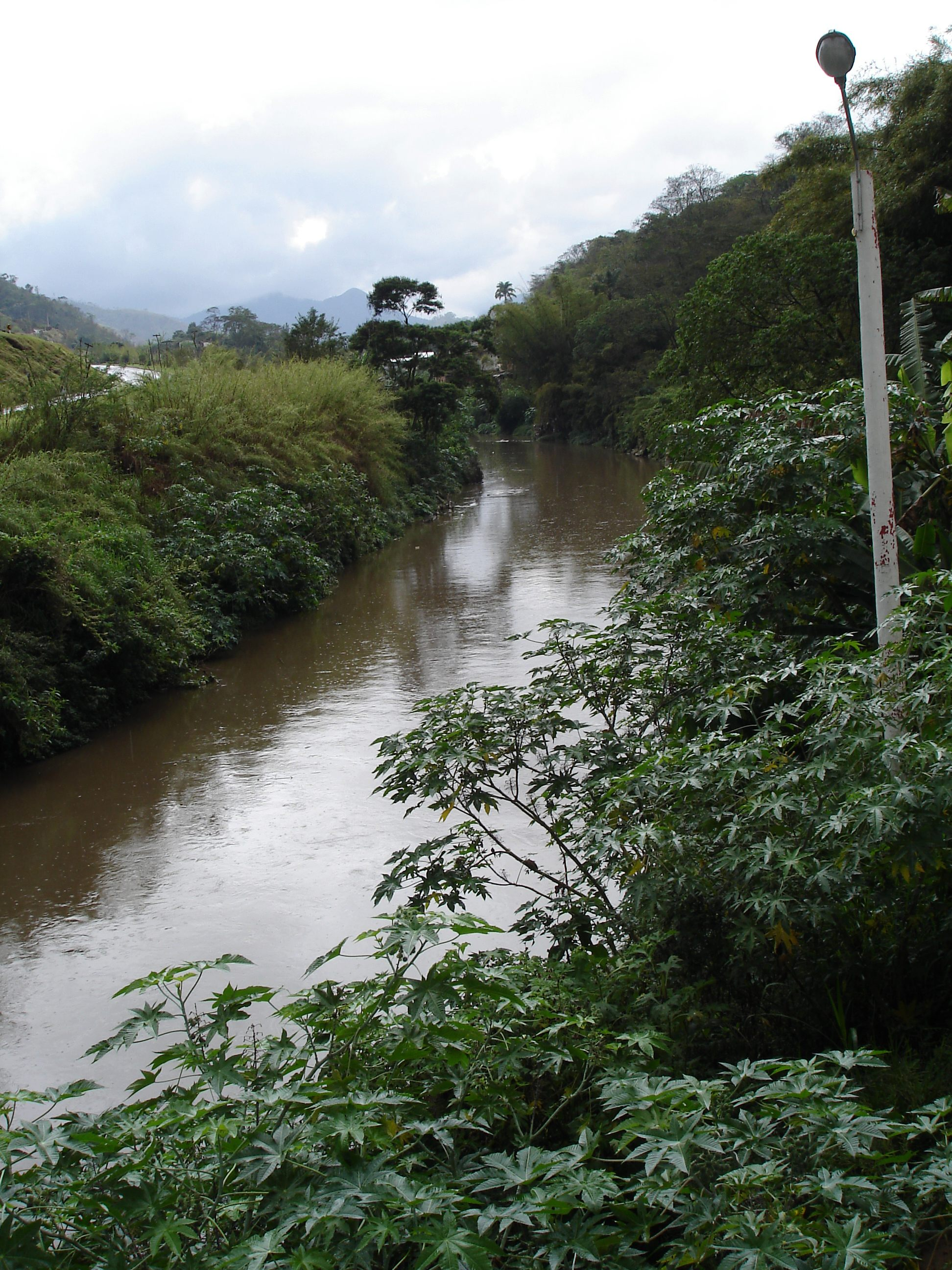

- Location within Brazil
- Native name: Rio Piabanha (Portuguese)

Location
- Country: Brazil

Physical characteristics
- Source
  - location: Petrópolis, Rio de Janeiro
  - coordinates: 22.497837°S 43.222616°W
- Mouth
  - coordinates: 22.111863°S 43.137605°W
- Length: 80 kilometres (50 mi)

Basin features
- River system: Paraíba do Sul

The Piabanha River (Portuguese: Rio Piabanha) is a river of Rio de Janeiro state in southeastern Brazil. It is a tributary of the Paraíba do Sul.

== Basin ==
The basin of the Piabanha River includes the basins of the upper Piabanha, Preto, Fagundes and Paquequer rivers. It fully drains the municipalities of Teresópolis, Carmo, Sapucaia, Sumidouro, Areal and São José do Vale do Rio Preto, and partially drains the municipalities of Petrópolis, Paty do Alferes, Paraíba do Sul, Duas Barras and Três Rios. The headwaters of the river are protected by the Três Picos State Park, Serra dos Órgãos National Park, Petrópolis Municipal Nature Park, Montanhas de Teresópolis Municipal Nature Park, Araras State Biological Reserve and Araponga Municipal Nature Park among others.

== Course ==
The Piabanha rises in Petrópolis and runs for 80 kilometres (50 mi) to join the Paraíba do Sul, passing through Areal and Três Rios. The Preto drains the municipalities of Teresópolis and São José do Vale do Rio Preto, and joins the Piabanha in Areal. The Piabanha also receives the Fagundes in Areal.

== See also ==
- List of rivers of Rio de Janeiro

== Sources ==
- Reis Soares, Vinicius dos; Brandão Assis, Erika Melo (2012), Relatório de Situação da Região Hidrográfica Méio Paraíba do Sul (PDF) (in Portuguese), Petrópolis – RJ: Associação Pró-Gestão das Águas da Bacia Hidrográfica do Rio Paraíba do Sul
