= List of rivers of Rio de Janeiro =

List of rivers in Rio de Janeiro (Brazilian State).

The list is arranged by drainage basin from north to south, with respective tributaries indented under each larger stream's name and ordered from downstream to upstream. All rivers in Rio de Janeiro drain to the Atlantic Ocean.

== By Drainage Basin ==
- Itabapoana River
- Guaxindiba River
- Paraíba do Sul
  - Muriaé River
    - São Domingos River
    - Carangola River
      - Conceição River
  - Do Colégio River
  - Dois Rios River
    - Negro River
    - Grande River
      - Bengala River
  - Pomba River
  - Pirapetinga River
  - Paquequer River
    - São Francisco River
  - Calçado River
  - Paraibuna River
    - Preto River
      - Das Flores River
        - Bonito River
      - São Fernando River
  - Piabanha River
    - Fagundes River
    - Preto River
      - Paquequer River
      - Das Bengalas River
      - Dos Frades River
  - Alegre River
  - Piraí River
  - Cachimbau River
  - Barra Mansa River
  - Bananal River
    - Bocaina River
  - Turvo River
  - Barreiro de Baixo River
  - Pirapetinga River
  - Sesmarias River
  - Campo Belo River
  - Do Salto River
- Pitangueiras River
- Ururaí River
  - Preto River
    - Bela Joana River
  - Do Imbé River
    - Mocotó River
  - Urubu River
- Macabu River
  - Do Meio River
  - Macabuzinho River
  - Santa Catarina River
  - Carucango River
  - Campista River
- Macaé River
  - São Pedro River
  - Sana River
  - Bonito River
  - Das Flores River
- Imboacica River
- São João River
  - Indaiaçu River
    - Aldeia Velha River
  - Capivari River
  - Bacaxá River
- Una River
- Mataruna River
- Regame River
- Ubatiba River
- Guaxindiba River
  - Alcântara River
    - Maria Paula River
      - Pendotiba River
- Caceribu River
  - Porto das Caixas River
    - Da Aldeia River
  - Do Gado River
  - Dos Duques River
  - Bonito River
- Macacu River
  - Soberbo River
  - Guapi-Áçu River
- Magé River
- Iriri River
- Suruí River
- Estrela River
  - Inhomirim River
  - Saracuruna River
  - Imbariê River
- Iguaçu River
  - Sarapuí River
  - Capivari River
  - Botas River
  - Tinguá River
- São João de Meriti River (Meriti River)
  - Acari River
  - Pavuna River
- Jequiá River (on Governador Island)
- Faria Timbó River
- Maracanã River
  - Trapicheiros River
- Carioca River
- Grande River
- Piraquê River
  - Cabuçu River
- Guandu River
  - Piranema River
  - Guandu-Mirim River
  - Queimados River
    - Dos Poços River
      - Santo Antônio River
  - São Pedro River
  - Santana River
  - Ribeirão das Lajes
- Da Guarda River (Itaguaí River)
  - Mazomba River
- Do Saco River
- Japuiba River
- Bracuí River
- Mambucaba River
  - Do Funil River
- Da Barra Grande River
- Perequê-Áçu River
- Dos Meros River
- Pará Mirim River

== Alphabetically ==
- Acari River
- Alcântara River
- Da Aldeia River
- Aldeia Velha River
- Alegre River
- Bacaxá River
- Bananal River
- Da Barra Grande River
- Barra Mansa River
- Barreiro de Baixo River
- Bela Joana River
- Bengala River
- Das Bengalas River
- Bocaina River
- Bonito River
- Bonito River
- Bonito River
- Botas River
- Bracuí River
- Cabuçu River
- Caceribu River
- Cachimbau River
- Calçado River
- Campista River
- Campo Belo River
- Capivari River
- Capivari River
- Carangola River
- Carioca River
- Carucango River
- Do Colégio River
- Conceição River
- Dois Rios River
- Dos Duques River
- Estrela River
- Fagundes River
- Faria Timbó River
- Das Flores River
- Das Flores River
- Dos Frades River
- Do Funil River
- Do Gado River
- Grande River
- Grande River
- Guandu River
- Guandu-Mirim River
- Guapi-Áçu River
- Da Guarda River (Itaguaí River)
- Guaxindiba River
- Guaxindiba River
- Iguaçu River
- Imbariê River
- Do Imbé River
- Imboacica River
- Indaiaçu River
- Inhomirim River
- Iriri River
- Itabapoana River
- Japuiba River
- Jequiá River (on Governador Island)
- Macabu River
- Macabuzinho River
- Macacu River
- Macaé River
- Magé River
- Mambucaba River
- Maracanã River
- Maria Paula River
- Mataruna River
- Mazomba River
- Do Meio River
- Dos Meros River
- Mocotó River
- Muriaé River
- Negro River
- Paquequer River
- Paquequer River
- Pará Mirim River
- Paraíba do Sul
- Paraibuna River
- Pavuna River
- Pendotiba River
- Perequê-Áçu River
- Piabanha River
- Piraí River
- Piranema River
- Pirapetinga River
- Pirapetinga River
- Piraquê River
- Pitangueiras River
- Dos Poços River
- Pomba River
- Porto das Caixas River
- Preto River
- Preto River
- Preto River
- Queimados River
- Regame River
- Ribeirão das Lajes
- Do Saco River
- Do Salto River
- Sana River
- Santa Catarina River
- Santana River
- Santo Antônio River
- São Domingos River
- São Fernando River
- São Francisco River
- São João de Meriti River (Meriti River)
- São João River
- São Pedro River
- São Pedro River
- Saracuruna River
- Sarapuí River
- Sesmarias River
- Soberbo River
- Suruí River
- Tinguá River
- Trapicheiros River
- Turvo River
- Ubatiba River
- Una River
- Urubu River
- Ururaí River
