= Paquequer River =

Paquequer River may refer to:

- Paquequer River (Sumidouro), a river in Brazil
- Paquequer River (Teresópolis), a river in Brazil
