= Das Flores River =

There are several rivers named Das Flores River or Rio das Flores in Brazil:

- Das Flores River (Maranhão)
- Das Flores River (Preto River tributary)
- Das Flores River (Rio de Janeiro)
- Das Flores River (Santa Catarina)
