= Montanhas de Teresópolis Municipal Nature Park =

- Parque Natural Municipal Montanhas de Teresópolis
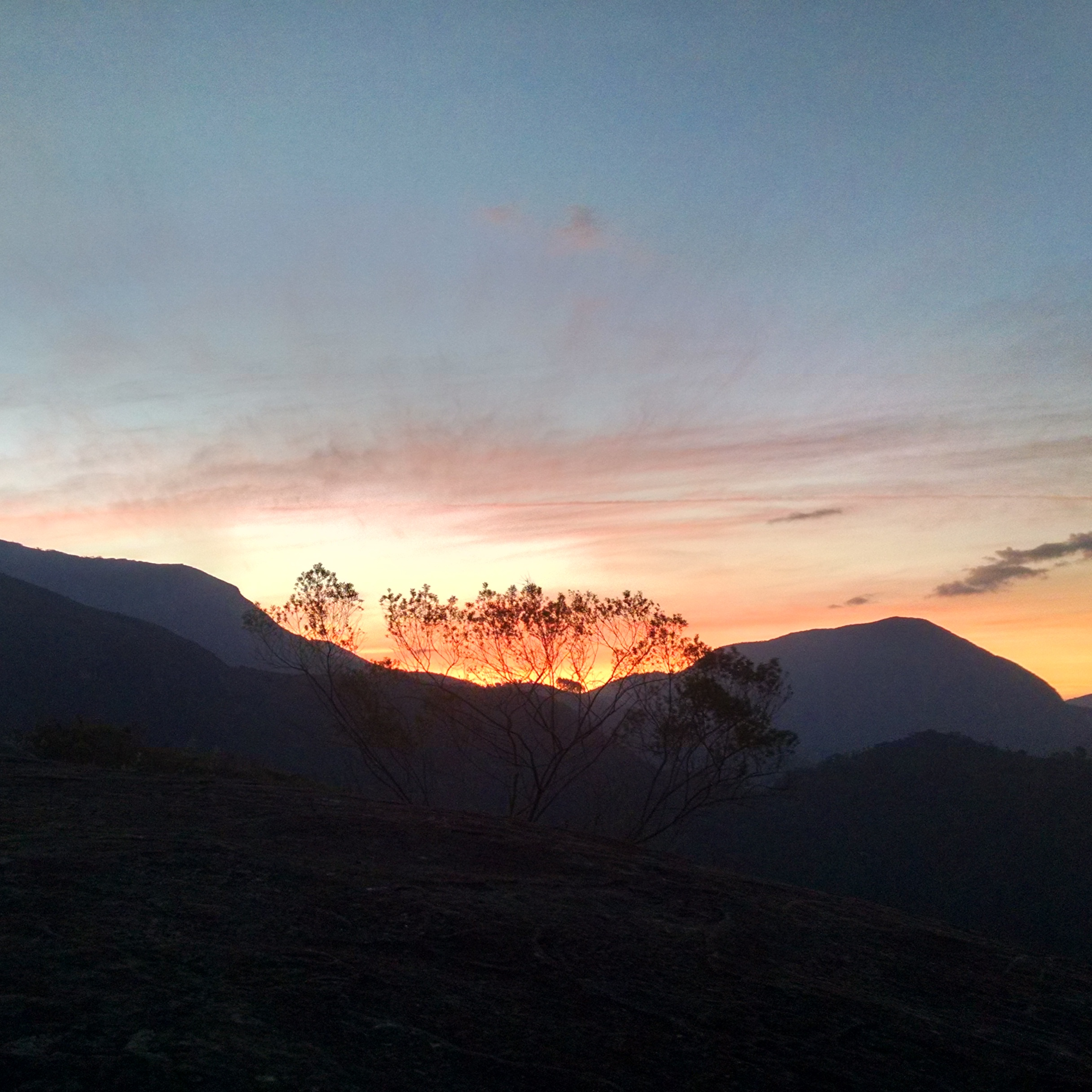
- The park at sunset in May 2014

- Location within Brazil
- Nearest city: Teresópolis, Rio de Janeiro
- Coordinates: 22°20′03″S 43°00′54″W
- Area: 4,397 hectares (10,870 acres)
- Designation: Municipal nature park
- Created: 6 July 2009
- Administrator: Secretaria Municipal de Meio Ambiente

The Montanhas de Teresópolis Municipal Nature Park (Portuguese: Parque Natural Municipal Montanhas de Teresópolis) is a municipal nature park in the state of Rio de Janeiro, Brazil. It protects an area of Atlantic Forest. The area has been badly degraded in some areas by human activity before the park was created, but efforts are being made to restore the former ecology.

== Location ==
The Montanhas de Teresópolis Municipal Nature Park is in the northwest part of the municipality of Teresópolis, adjoining the municipalities of Petrópolis and São José do Vale do Rio Preto. With an area of 4,397 hectares (10,870 acres), it is the largest fully protected municipal conservation unit in the state of Rio de Janeiro. It is in the hydrological basin of the Piabanha, Preto and Paquequer rivers. The park contains an imposing mountain range that contains large rocky outcrops such as the Tartaruga, Camelo and Santana. The park is used by students of the municipality's Alpine Farming |School for environmental education projects in a partnership between the environment and education departments. The park adjoins the Serra dos Órgãos National Park at the Caleme Dam.

== History ==
The Montanhas de Teresópolis Municipal Nature Park was created by municipal decree 3.693 of 6 June 2009. The objectives are to preserve natural ecosystems of great ecological importance and scenic beauty, enabling scientific research and education, recreation in contact with nature and eco-tourism. The park was included in the Central Rio de Janeiro Atlantic Forest Mosaic, which had been created in December 2006. As of 2016 the park did not have a management plan.

== Environment ==
The park protects many springs and important remnants of Atlantic Forest. An ecological survey identified 121 bird species, 31 mammals, including some endangered species, 19 reptiles, 10 amphibians and 8 groups of insects. Much damage was done to the ecology in the past, but it is slowly recovering. Extraction of minerals was common, but is now prohibited, and the traces of quarrying are being covered by vegetation. A partnership between the park and the Federal University of Rio de Janeiro is to plant seedlings of native Atlantic Forest trees in the most degraded areas. Hunting and trapping of birds has been almost eliminated with the help of the people living around the conservation unit.

== Headquarters ==
The Santa Rita center contains a settlement founded by the Swiss zoologist Émil Goeldi in 1891. It was expropriated by the Instituto Nacional de Colonização e Reforma Agrária (INCRA: National Institute for Colonization and Agrarian Reform) in 1990 and made into a rural settlement project with about 100 plots. It contains the park headquarters, accommodation, a leisure area and an interpretive trail. The region was hit by the massive storm of January 2011. The headquarters of the park occupy an area of 42 hectares (100 acres) that was purchased by the municipality in late 2012. Damage to the area from the January 2011 storm had been repaired by 2014. The headquarters include the administrative center, an auditorium, library and areas for research work and permanent exhibitions. Another building to accommodate visitors was planned in 2013.

== Other centers ==
For administrative purposes there are two other distinct centers. The Pedra da Tartaruga (Turtle Rock) center contains the rock mass including the Tartaruga, Camelo and Arrieiro rocks. It has easy trails, a camping area, clean water and toilets. It is used for sports such as hiking, climbing and abseiling. Some damage is caused by motorcyclists on the trails and by granite extractors. The Ponte Nova center is the best preserved area of the park, with well-preserved forest remnants and little human disturbance. Some organic farming is practiced in this area. However, it is threatened by intensive agriculture on the boundary with São José do Vale do Rio Preto. This area is closed to the public.

== Sources ==
- Costa, Cláudia; Lamas, Ivana; Fernandes, Rosan (December 2010), Planejamento Estratégico do Mosaico Central Fluminense (PDF) (in Portuguese), Reserva da Biosfera da Mata Atlântica
- Parque Natural Municipal Montanhas de Teresópolis (in Portuguese), Prefeitura Municipal de Teresópolis: Secretaria de Meio Ambiente, archived from the original on 2016-10-06
- Sede do Parque Municipal em Santa Rita Melhora Estrutura Para Receber Visitantes (in Portuguese), Prefeitura Municipal de Teresópolis: Secretaria de Meio Ambiente, 11 March 2014
- "Sede do Parque Natural Montanhas de Teresópolis será inaugurada em julho", visiteteresopolis.com.br (in Portuguese), 18 April 2013
