= Da Aldeia River =

Location
- Country: Brazil

Physical characteristics
- Source
  - location: Rio de Janeiro state
- Mouth: Porto das Caixas River
  - coordinates: 22°43′S 42°53′W

The Da Aldeia River is a river of Rio de Janeiro state in southeastern Brazil.

== See also ==
- List of rivers of Rio de Janeiro
