= Do Meio River (Rio de Janeiro) =

Location
- Country: Brazil

Physical characteristics
- Source
  - location: Rio de Janeiro state
- Mouth: Macabu River
  - coordinates: 22°3′S 41°33′W

The Do Meio River is a river of Rio de Janeiro state in southeastern Brazil. It is a tributary of the Macabu River.

== See also ==
- List of rivers of Rio de Janeiro
