= Bonito River (Caceribu River tributary) =

River in Rio de Janeiro state, Brazil

Location
- Country: Brazil

Physical characteristics
- Source
  - location: Rio de Janeiro state
- Mouth: Caceribu River
  - coordinates: 22°43′S 42°43′W

The Bonito River is a river of Rio de Janeiro state in southeastern Brazil. It is a tributary of the Caceribu River.

== See also ==
- List of rivers of Rio de Janeiro
