= São Domingos River (Rio de Janeiro) =

Location
- Country: Brazil

Physical characteristics
- Source
  - location: Rio de Janeiro state
- Mouth: Muriaé River
  - coordinates: 22°24′S 42°13′W

The São Domingos River is a river of Rio de Janeiro state in southeastern Brazil.

== See also ==
- List of rivers of Rio de Janeiro
