= Cabuçu River =

River in South Eastern Brazil

Location
- Country: Brazil

Physical characteristics
- Source
  - location: Rio de Janeiro state
- Mouth: Piraquê River
  - coordinates: 22°57′S 43°36′W

The Cabuçu River is a river situated in South Eastern Brazil within the state of Rio de Janeiro.

== See also ==
- List of rivers of Rio de Janeiro
