= Preto River (Ururaí River tributary) =

Location
- Country: Brazil

Physical characteristics
- Source
  - location: Rio de Janeiro state
- Mouth: Ururaí River
  - coordinates: 21°46′S 41°28′W

The Preto River is a river of Rio de Janeiro state in southeastern Brazil. It is a tributary of the Ururaí River.

== See also ==
- List of rivers of Rio de Janeiro
