= Barra Grande River =

There are several rivers named Barra Grande River:

== Brazil ==
- Barra Grande River (Ivaí River tributary), Paraná state
- Barra Grande River (Santa Catarina)
- Barra Grande River (Tibagi River tributary), Paraná state
- Da Barra Grande River, Rio de Janeiro state
