= Ribeirão das Lajes =

Location
- Country: Brazil

Physical characteristics
- Source
  - location: Rio de Janeiro state
- Mouth: Guandu River
  - coordinates: 22°39′S 43°42′W

The Ribeirão das Lajes is a river of Rio de Janeiro state in southeastern Brazil.

== See also ==
- List of rivers of Rio de Janeiro
