= Jequiá River =

Jequiá River may refer to:

- Jequiá River (Alagoas), a river in the state of Alqagoas, Brazil
- Jequiá River (Rio de Janeiro), a river in the state of Rio de Janeiro, Brazil
