= Bonito River (Macaé River tributary) =

- Location within Brazil
- Native name: Rio Bonito River (Portuguese)

Location
- Country: Brazil

Physical characteristics
- Source
  - location: Rio de Janeiro state
- Mouth
  - coordinates: 22.386763°S 42.309695°W

The Bonito River (Portuguese: Rio Bonito) is a river of Rio de Janeiro state in southeastern Brazil. It is a tributary of the Macaé River.

The river is protected by the 35,038 hectares (86,580 acres) Macaé de Cima Environmental Protection Area, created in 2001.

== See also ==
- List of rivers of Rio de Janeiro
