= Urubu =

Urubu or Urubú may refer to:

- Urubu River (disambiguation), several rivers
- Urubu people (Ka'apor)
- Urubu language
- Black vulture
- Urubu (album), a 1976 album by Antonio Carlos Jobim
- Urubu (film), an American film
- I.Ae. 41 Urubú, a glider built in Argentina
- CR Flamengo, a Brazilian football club known as the Urubus (Vultures)
