= Frades =

Frades may refer to:

- Frades, A Coruña, municipality in Galicia, A Coruña, Spain
- Frades de la Sierra, municipality in Castile and León, Spain
- Oliveira de Frades, municipality in Portugal
- Frades, Portugal, parish in the municipality of Póvoa de Lanhoso
- Frades River (disambiguation), name of two rivers in Brasil.
