= Guapiaçú River =

- Location within Brazil
- Native name: Rio Guapiaçú (Portuguese)

Location
- Country: Brazil

Physical characteristics
- Source
  - location: Rio de Janeiro state
- Mouth
  - location: Macacu River, Itaboraí, RJ
  - coordinates: 22.654946°S 42.906334°W

The Guapiaçú River (Portuguese: Rio Guapiaçú, sometimes Guapi-Áçu River) is a river of Rio de Janeiro state in southeastern Brazil. It is a tributary of the Macacu River.

The Guapiaçú River forms part of the eastern boundary of the 15,582 hectares (38,500 acres) Guapi-Guapiaçú Environmental Protection Area, created in 2004. It rises in the Serra do Mar between Nova Friburgo and Cachoeiras de Macacu. In its lower reaches, it defines the boundary between the municipalities of Cachoeiras de Macacu to the east and Guapimirim to the west.

== See also ==
- List of rivers of Rio de Janeiro

== Sources ==
- Área de Proteção Ambiental Guapi-Guapiaçú (PDF) (in Portuguese), RBMA: Reserva da Biosfera da Mata Atlântica
