= Pendotiba River =

Location
- Country: Brazil

Physical characteristics
- Source
  - location: Rio de Janeiro state
- Mouth: Maria Paula River
  - coordinates: 22°53′S 43°2′W

The Pendotiba River is a river of Rio de Janeiro state in southeastern Brazil.

== See also ==
- List of rivers of Rio de Janeiro
