= Bengalas River =

Bengala River
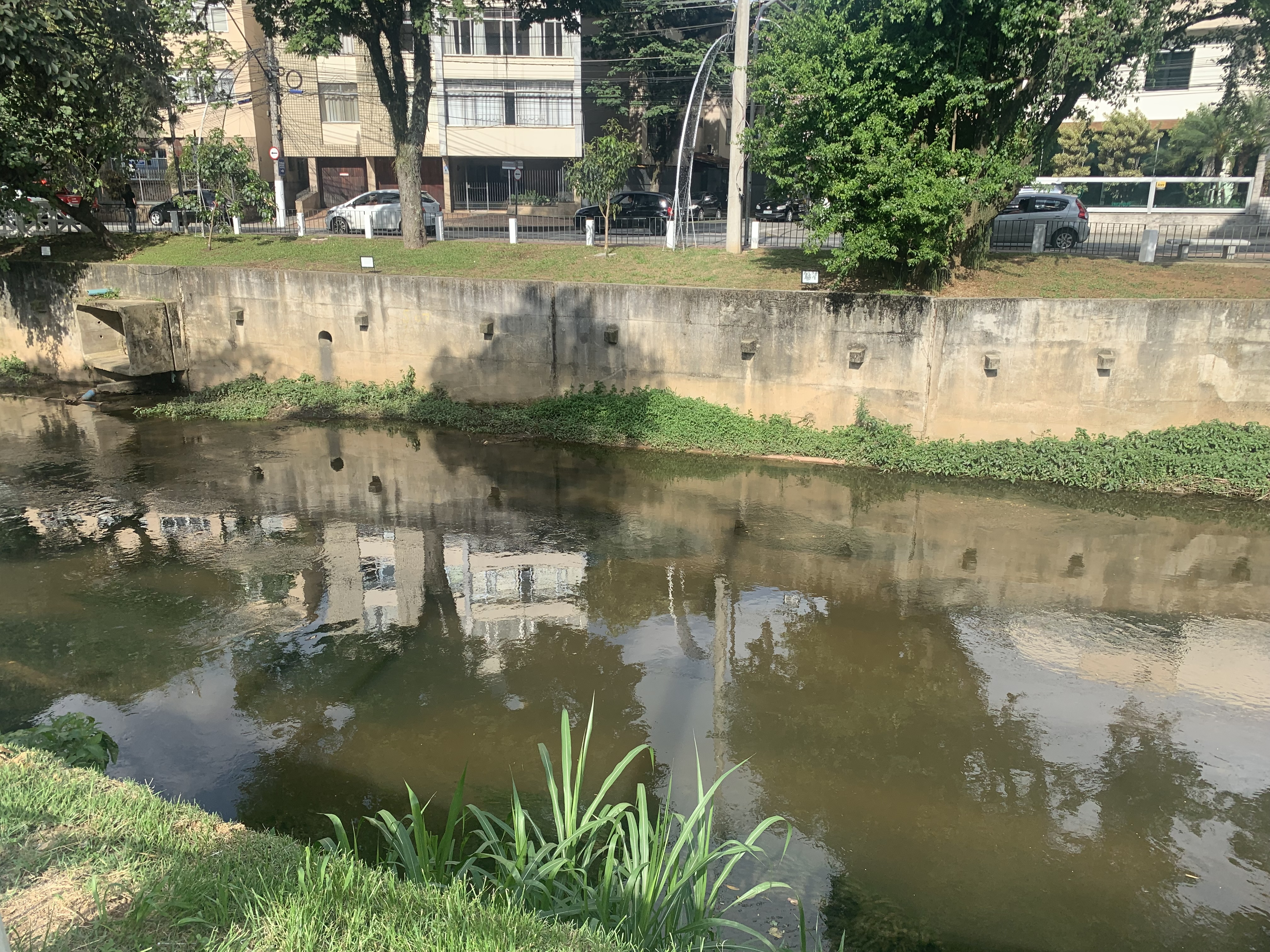

Location
- Country: Brazil

Physical characteristics
- Source
  - location: Rio de Janeiro state
- Mouth: Rio Grande
  - coordinates: 22°12′S 42°29′W

The Bengalas River is a river of Rio de Janeiro state in southeastern Brazil.

== See also ==
- List of rivers of Rio de Janeiro
