= Casimiro de Abreu, Rio de Janeiro =

Casimiro de Abreu
- Municipality
- Município de Casimiro de Abreu
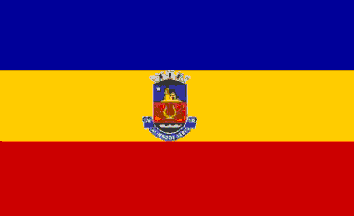
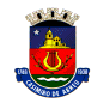
- Flag Coat of arms

- Location of Casimiro de Abreu in the state of Rio de Janeiro

- Location of Casimiro de Abreu in Brazil
- Coordinates: 22°28′51″S 42°12′14″W
- Country: Brazil
- Region: Southeast
- State: Rio de Janeiro

Government
  - Prefeito: Paulo Cezar Dames Passos (PSB)

Area
  - Total: 462.918 km^{2} (178.734 sq mi)
- Elevation: 17 m (56 ft)

Population (2022)
  - Total: 46,110
  - Density: 99.61/km^{2} (258.0/sq mi)
- Time zone: UTC−3 (BRT)

Casimiro de Abreu (Portuguese pronunciation: [kaziˈmiɾu dʒ(j) ɐˈbɾew]) (formerly known as Barra de São João Portuguese pronunciation: [ˈbaʁɐ d(ʒi) sɐ̃w ʒuˈɐ̃w]) is a municipality located in the Brazilian state of Rio de Janeiro. Its population was 46,110 (2022) and its area is 462 km^{2}.

The city was called Indaiaçu until it was rebaptized in 1925 to homage the poet Casimiro de Abreu, who was born in their coastal district Barra de São João.

The municipality contains part of the Central Rio de Janeiro Atlantic Forest Mosaic, created in 2006. It holds part of the União Biological Reserve, home to a population of endangered golden lion tamarin. It contains 1,045 hectares (2,580 acres) of the 35,038 hectares (86,580 acres) Macaé de Cima Environmental Protection Area, created in 2001.
