= Bocaina River (Bananal River tributary) =

Location
- Country: Brazil

Physical characteristics
- Source
  - location: Rio de Janeiro state
- Mouth: Bananal River
  - coordinates: 22°32′S 44°12′W

The Bocaina River is a river of Rio de Janeiro state in southeastern Brazil. It is a tributary of the Bananal River.

== See also ==
- List of rivers of Rio de Janeiro
