= São Pedro River (Macaé River tributary) =

Location
- Country: Brazil

Physical characteristics
- Source
  - location: Rio de Janeiro state
- Mouth: Macaé River
  - coordinates: 22°18′S 41°51′W

The São Pedro River is a river of Rio de Janeiro state in southeastern Brazil.

== See also ==
- List of rivers of Rio de Janeiro
