= Mocotó River =

Location
- Country: Brazil

Physical characteristics
- Source
  - location: Rio de Janeiro state
- Mouth: Imbé River
  - coordinates: 21°52′S 41°41′W

The Mocotó River is a river of Rio de Janeiro state in southeastern Brazil. It flows into the Imbé River and is situated within the administrative boundaries of Rio de Janeiro state, with approximate coordinates at 21°52'0"S, 41°41'0"W.

== See also ==
- List of rivers of Rio de Janeiro
