= São Pedro River (Guandu River tributary) =

- Location within Brazil
- Native name: Rio São Pedro River (Portuguese)

Location
- Country: Brazil

Physical characteristics
- Source
  - location: Rio de Janeiro state
- Mouth
  - location: Nova Belem, Japeri, Rio de Janeiro
  - coordinates: 22.660264°S 43.633154°W

Basin features
- River system: Guandu River

The São Pedro River is a river of Rio de Janeiro state in southeastern Brazil. It is a tributary of the Guandu River.

The 2,353 hectares (5,810 acres) Jaceruba Environmental Protection Area in the municipality of Nova Iguaçu was created in 2002 with objectives that included protection and preservation of the forests, springs and headwaters of the São Pedro River basin.

== See also ==
- List of rivers of Rio de Janeiro
