= Capivari River (São João River tributary) =

Location
- Country: Brazil

Physical characteristics
- Source
  - location: Rio de Janeiro state
- Mouth: São João River
  - coordinates: 22°38′S 42°20′W

The Capivari River is a river of Rio de Janeiro state in southeastern Brazil. It is a tributary of the São João River.

== See also ==
- List of rivers of Rio de Janeiro
