= Santa Catarina River (Rio de Janeiro) =

Location
- Country: Brazil

Physical characteristics
- Source
  - location: Rio de Janeiro state
- Mouth: Macabu River
  - coordinates: 22°6′S 41°49′W

The Santa Catarina River is a river of Rio de Janeiro state in southeastern Brazil.

== See also ==
- List of rivers of Rio de Janeiro
