= Bonito River (Das Flores River tributary) =

Location
- Country: Brazil

Physical characteristics
- Source
  - location: Rio de Janeiro state
- Mouth: Das Flores River
  - coordinates: 22°9′S 43°40′W

The Bonito River is a river of Rio de Janeiro state in southeastern Brazil. It is a tributary of the Das Flores River.

== See also ==
- List of rivers of Rio de Janeiro
