= Rio Negro (Rio de Janeiro) =

Negro River

Location
- Country: Brazil

Physical characteristics
- Source
  - location: Rio de Janeiro state
- Mouth: Dois Rios River
  - coordinates: 21°45′S 41°57′W

Rio Negro (Portuguese for "black river") is a river of Rio de Janeiro state in southeastern Brazil.

== See also ==
- List of rivers of Rio de Janeiro
