= Capivari River (Rio de Janeiro) =

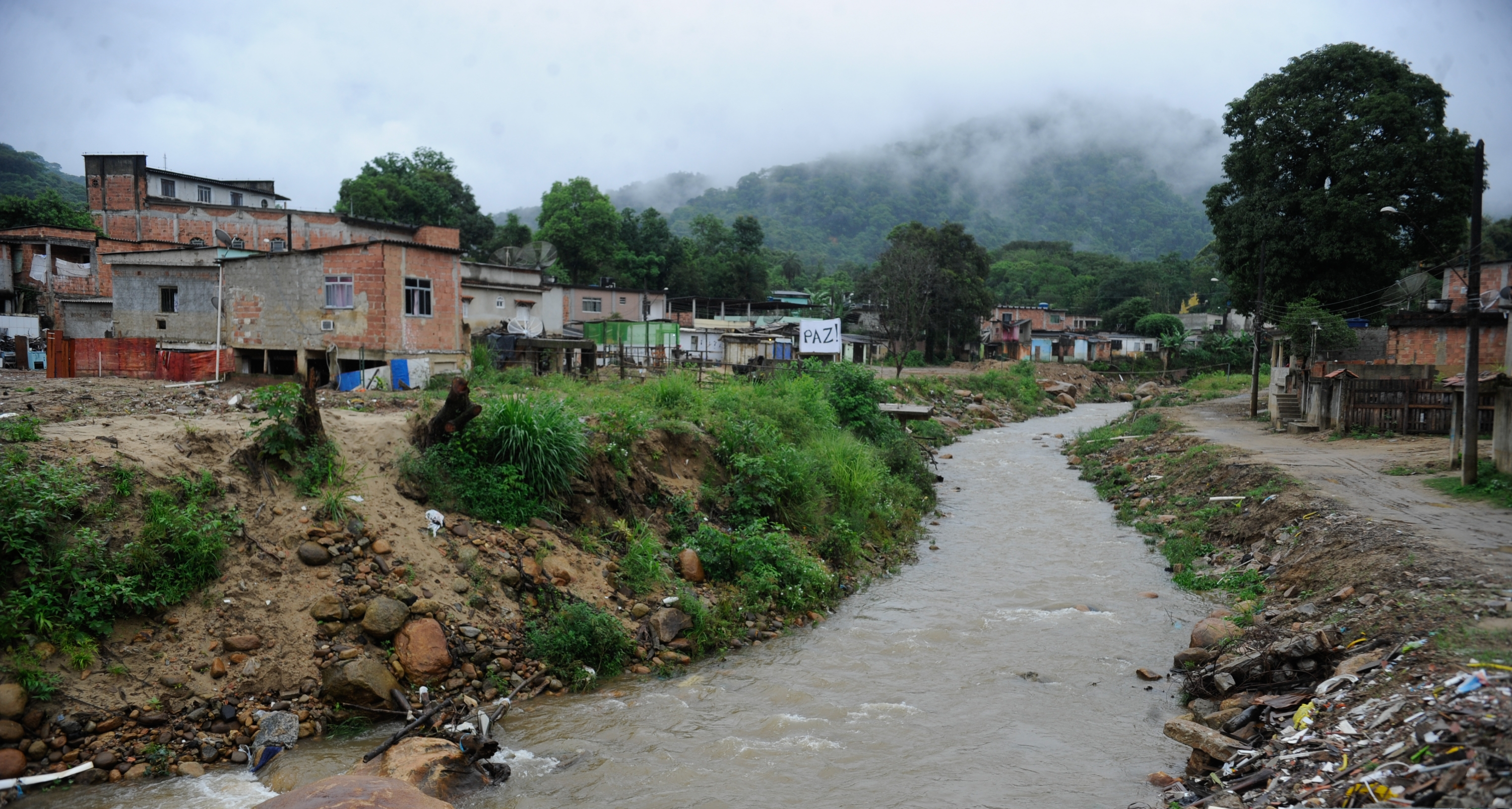

Location
- Country: Brazil

Physical characteristics
- Source
  - location: Rio de Janeiro state
- Mouth: Iguaçu River
  - coordinates: 22°42′S 43°20′W

The Capivari River is a river of Rio de Janeiro state in southeastern Brazil. It is a tributary of the Iguaçu River.

== See also ==
- List of rivers of Rio de Janeiro
