= Sarapuí River =

There are two rivers named Sarapuí River in Brazil:

- Sarapuí River (São Paulo)
- Sarapuí River (Rio de Janeiro)
