= Do Gado River =

River in Rio de Janeiro, Brazil

Location
- Country: Brazil

Physical characteristics
- Source
  - location: Rio de Janeiro state
- Mouth: Caceribu River
  - coordinates: 22°43′S 42°48′W

The Do Gado River is a river of Rio de Janeiro state in southeastern Brazil.

== See also ==
- List of rivers of Rio de Janeiro
