= Soberbo River =

River in Brazil

Location
- Country: Brazil

Physical characteristics
- Source
  - location: Serra dos Órgãos
- Mouth
  - location: Macacu River
  - coordinates: 22°39′33″S 42°57′14″W

Soberbo River (Portuguese: Rio Soberbo) is the river that cuts off the city of Guapimirim in the state of Rio de Janeiro.

The Soberbo River originates in the Serra dos Órgãos and has several waterfalls throughout its course, flowing into the Macacu River.

On rainy days on the top of the mountain range, the river will often fill up rapidly and cause the phenomenon known as "waterhead". Several people have died due to this phenomenon.

== See also ==
- List of rivers of Rio de Janeiro
