= Das Flores River (Preto River tributary) =

Location
- Country: Brazil

Physical characteristics
- Source
  - location: Rio de Janeiro state
- Mouth: Preto River
  - coordinates: 22°5′S 43°34′W

The Das Flores River is a river of Rio de Janeiro state in southeastern Brazil. It is a tributary of the Preto River.

== See also ==
- List of rivers of Rio de Janeiro
