= União Biological Reserve =

Protected area in Brazil

- Reserva biológica União
- IUCN category Ia (strict nature reserve)
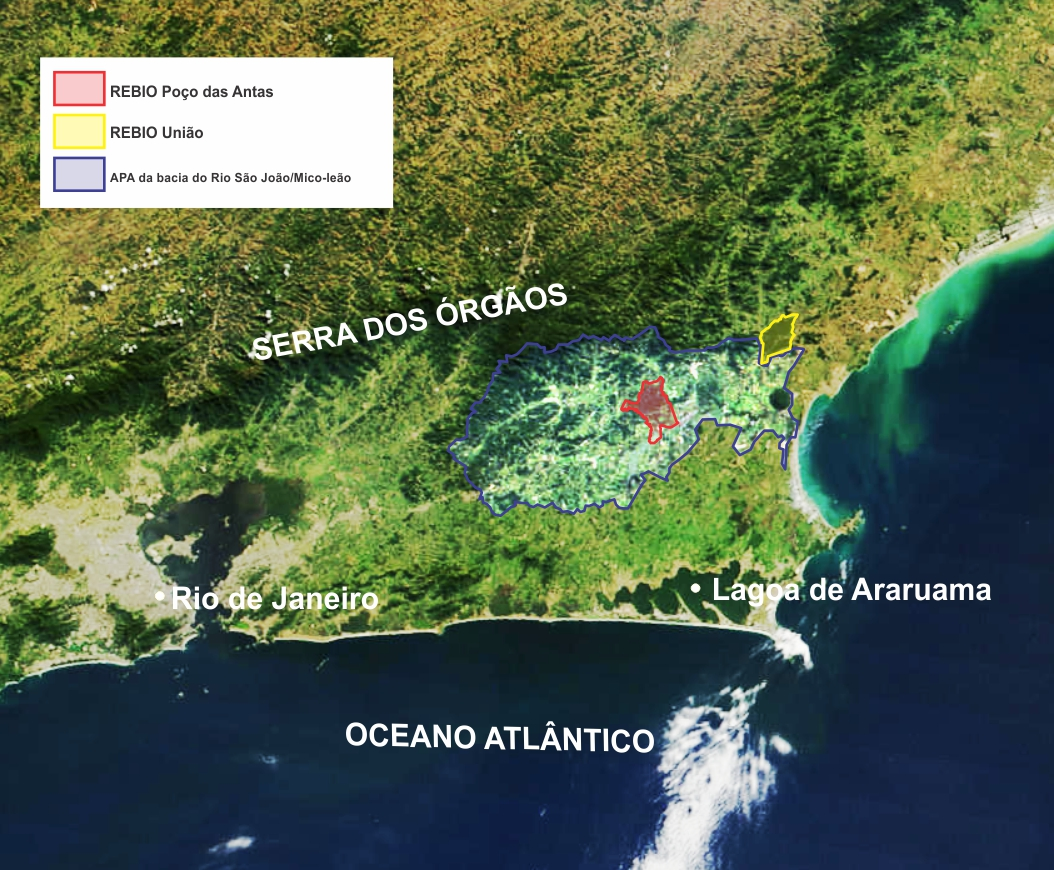
- Reserve (yellow outline) on a satellite photo

- Location within Brazil
- Nearest city: Macaé, Rio de Janeiro
- Coordinates: 22.425°S 42.037°W
- Area: 2,548 hectares (6,300 acres)
- Designation: Biological reserve
- Created: 22 April 1998
- Administrator: ICMBio

União Biological Reserve (Portuguese: Reserva biológica União [ʁeˈzɛʁvɐ bi.oˈlɔʒikɐ uniˈɐ̃w]) is a strictly protected biological reserve in the state of Rio de Janeiro, Brazil. It is home to a population of endangered golden lion tamarin.

== Location ==
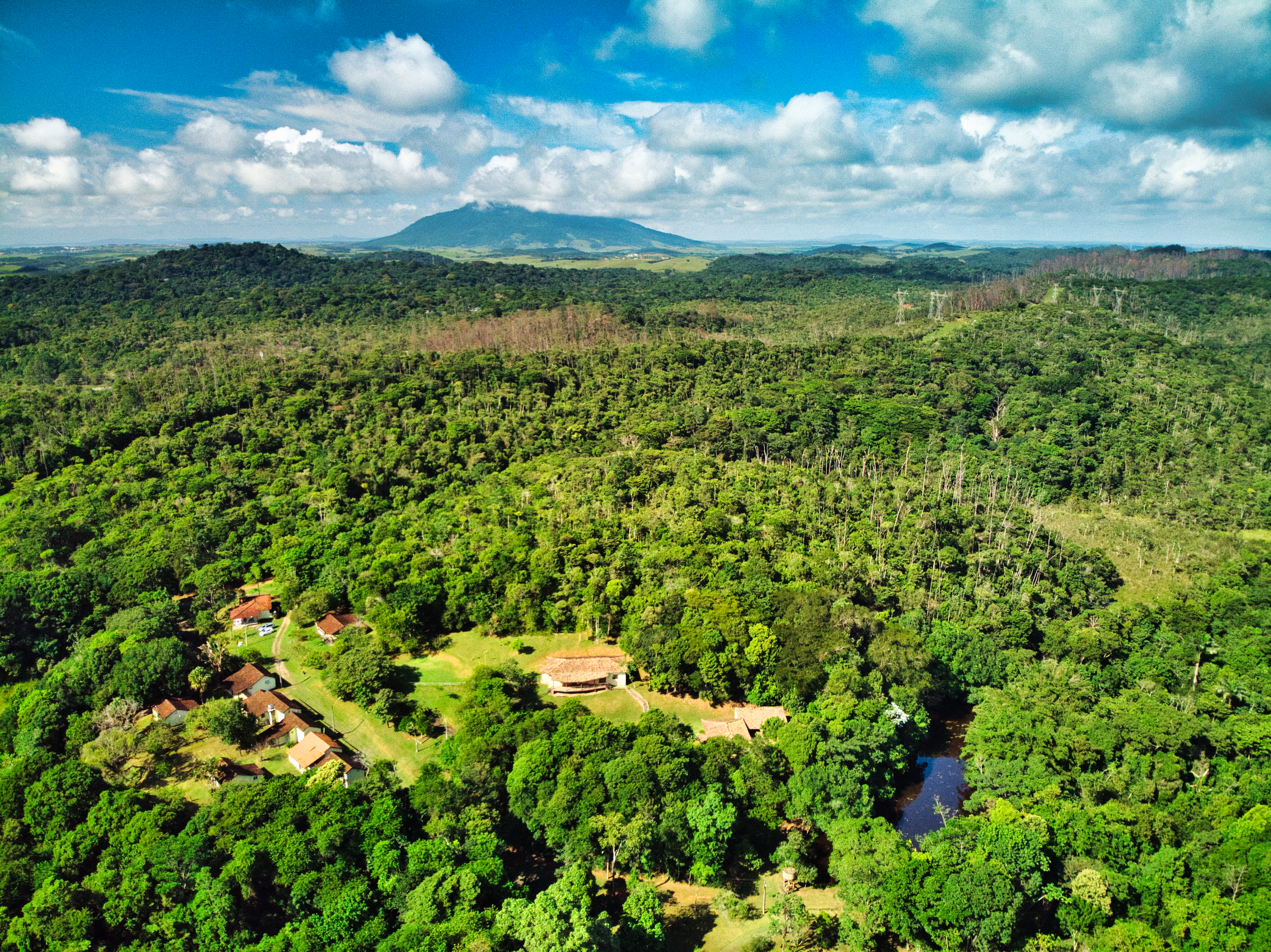
Reserva Biologica União

The União Biological Reserve covers parts of the municipalities of Casimiro de Abreu, Macaé and Rio das Ostras in the state of Rio de Janeiro. It is in the Atlantic Forest biome, and covers 2,548 hectares (6,300 acres). Altitude varies from 50 to 350 metres (160 to 1,150 ft). About 58% of the reserve covers the hilly coastal area, with small rounded hills. Another 40% is a more rugged region of ridges and escarpments. There are some small areas of flooded land. The reserve is drained by the basins of the Macaé, São João and Ostras rivers.

Average annual rainfall is 1,658 millimetres (65.3 in). Temperatures range from 20 to 28 °C (68 to 82 °F) with an average of 24 °C (75 °F). The reserve holds areas of marshland and coastal Atlantic Forest in good condition. An exotic eucalyptus forest covers 8.6% of the area, and will be replaced by native species. 249 species of trees have been recorded. The plumbeous kite (Ictinia plumbea) visits via the reserve from September to January. The golden lion tamarin (Leontopithecus rosalia) and maned sloth (Bradypus torquatus) are endemic.

== Conservation ==
The União Biological Reserve was created on 22 April 1998 and is administered by the Chico Mendes Institute for Biodiversity Conservation (ICMBio). The reserve is classed as IUCN protected area category Ia (strict nature reserve). The general purpose is to fully preserve biota and other natural attributes in the reserve without direct human interference. It was created to preserve a fragment of Atlantic Forest and the typical fauna that depends on it, in particular the golden lion tamarin. Protected species include:

- golden lion tamarin (Leontopithecus rosalia)
- maned sloth (Bradypus torquatus)
- ocelot (Leopardus pardalis)
- cougar (Puma concolor)
- red-browed amazon (Amazoma rhodocorytha)
- white-necked hawk (Buteogallus lacernulatus)
- black-headed berryeater (Carpornis melanocephala)
- variegated tinamou (Crypturellus variegatus)
- black-necked aracari (Pteroglossus aracari)
- buffy-fronted seedeater (Sporophila frontalis)
- Temminck's seedeater (Sporophila falcirostris)
- turquoise tanager (Tangara mexicana)
- collared peccary (Pecari tajacu)
- ochre-marked parakeet (Pyrrhura cruentata)

== See also ==
- Iriry Lagoon

== Sources ==
- Rebio União (in Portuguese), Chico Mendes Institute for Biodiversity Conservation
- Unidade de Conservação: Reserva biológica União (in Portuguese), MMA: Ministério do Meio Ambiente
