= Do Saco River (Rio de Janeiro) =

Location
- Country: Brazil

Physical characteristics
- Source
  - location: Rio de Janeiro state
- Mouth: Mangaratiba Bay
  - coordinates: 22°56′S 44°3′W

The Do Saco River, also known as the Da Lapa River, is a river of Rio de Janeiro state in southeastern Brazil. It flows into Mangaratiba Bay, west of Rio de Janeiro city.

== See also ==
- List of rivers of Rio de Janeiro
