= Pará Mirim River =

River in Brazil

Location
- Country: Brazil

Physical characteristics
- Source
  - location: Rio de Janeiro state
- Mouth: Ilha Grande Bay
  - coordinates: 23°14′S 44°38′W

The Pará Mirim River is a river of Rio de Janeiro state in southeastern Brazil.

== See also ==
- List of rivers of Rio de Janeiro
