= Urubu River (Rio de Janeiro) =

Location
- Country: Brazil

Physical characteristics
- Source
  - location: Rio de Janeiro state
- Mouth: Ururaí River
  - coordinates: 21°48′S 41°34′W

The Urubu River is a river of Rio de Janeiro state in southeastern Brazil.

== See also ==
- List of rivers of Rio de Janeiro
