= Campo Belo River =

Location
- Country: Brazil

Physical characteristics
- Source
  - location: Rio de Janeiro state
- Mouth: Paraíba do Sul
  - coordinates: 22°29′S 44°31′W

The Campo Belo River is a river of Rio de Janeiro state in southeastern Brazil.

== See also ==
- List of rivers of Rio de Janeiro
