= Porto das Caixas River =

Location
- Country: Brazil

Physical characteristics
- Source
  - location: Rio de Janeiro state
- Mouth: Caceribu River
  - coordinates: 22°42′S 42°56′W

The Porto das Caixas River is a river of Rio de Janeiro state in southeastern Brazil.

== See also ==
- List of rivers of Rio de Janeiro
