= Pitangueiras River =

Location
- Country: Brazil

Physical characteristics
- Source
  - location: Rio de Janeiro state
- Mouth: Atlantic Ocean
  - coordinates: 22°4′S 41°9′W

The Pitangueiras River is a river of Rio de Janeiro state in southeastern Brazil.

== See also ==
- List of rivers of Rio de Janeiro
