= Mambucaba =

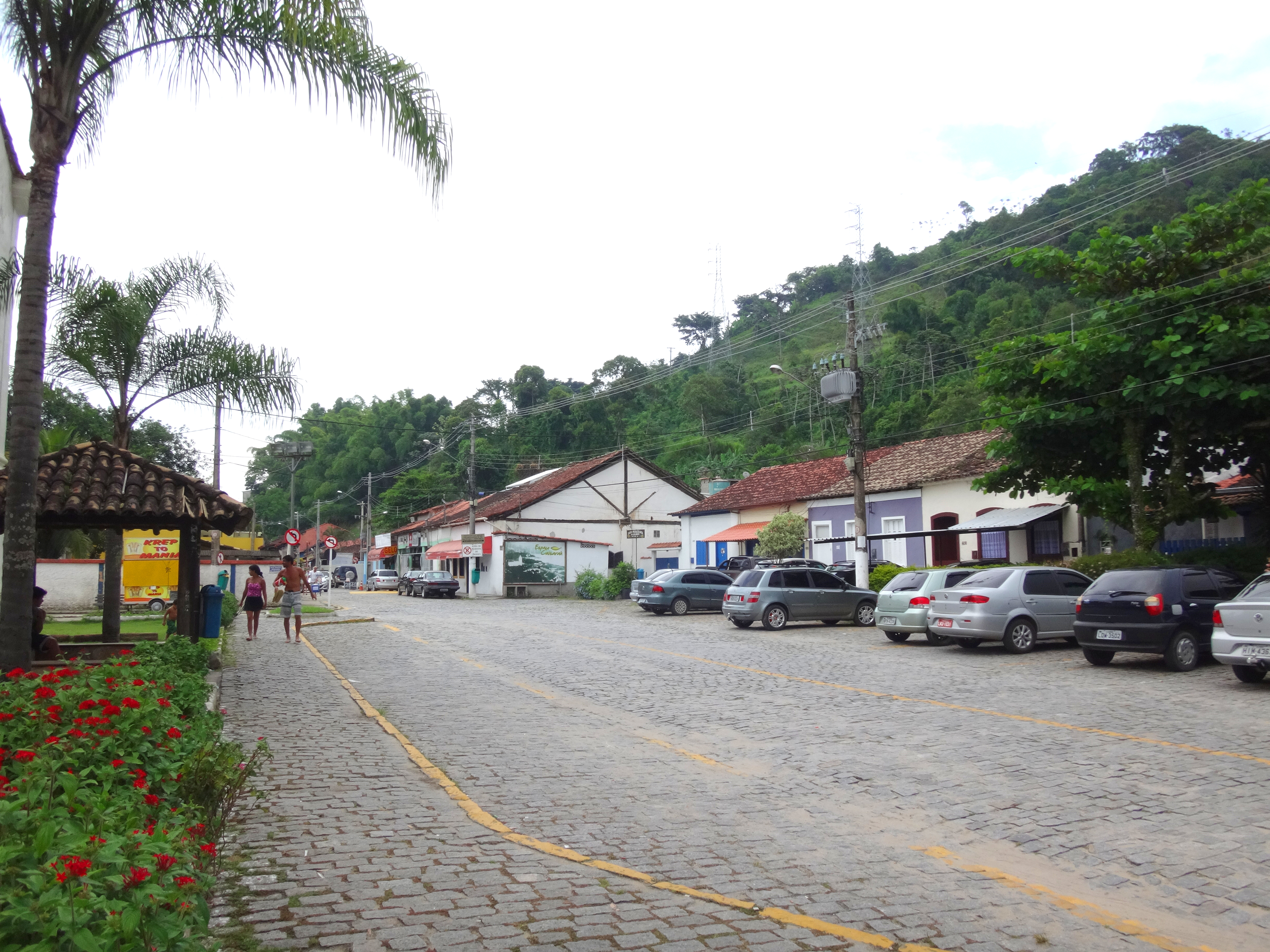
- Rua das Flores

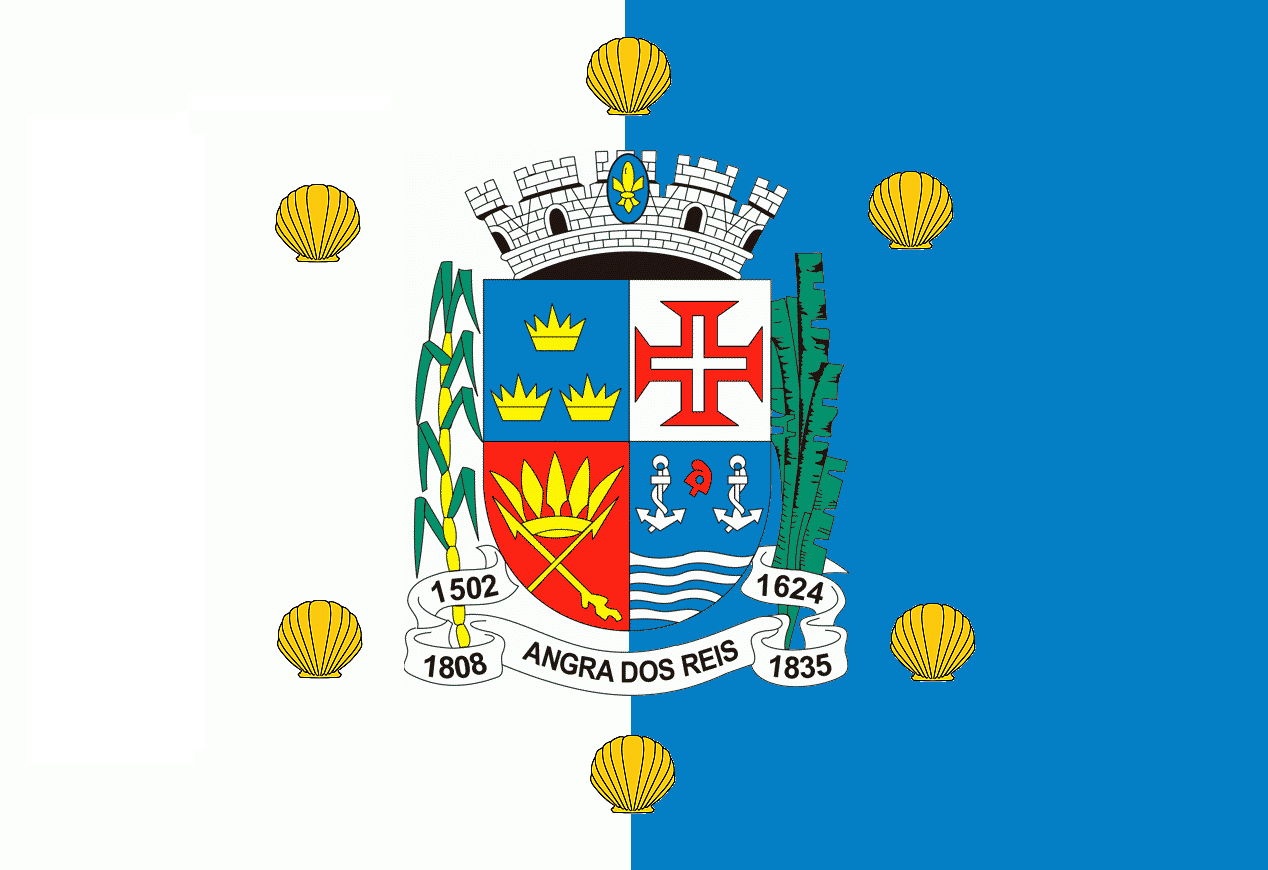
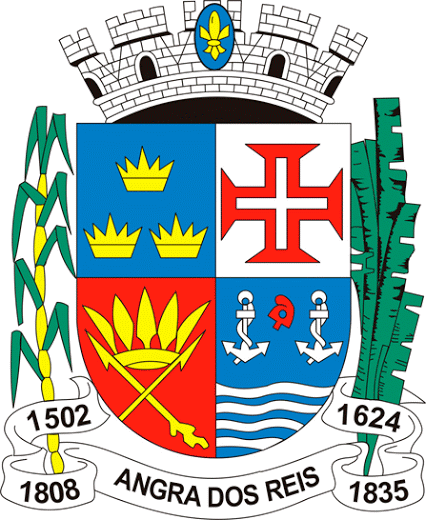
- Flag Seal

- Location in the state of Rio de Janeiro and Brazil

- Country: Brazil
- Region: Southeast
- State: Rio de Janeiro
- Founded: 1619
- Elevation: 6 m (20 ft)

Population
  - Total: 700
- Time zone: UTC-3 (UTC-3)
  - Summer (DST): UTC-2 (UTC-2)

The Historic village of Mambucaba is located in the 4th district of the municipality of Angra dos Reis, on the west coast of the state of Rio de Janeiro, Brazil. In the former headquarters of the district of Mambucaba, currently recognized as historical village, are the districts of Parque Mambucaba (Perequê), Praia Vermelha, Residential village of Praia Brava and Boa Vista. Across the Mambucaba River, near the village, lies the Mambucaba Residential Village (formerly known as Parada Beach) and the Batanguera Beach (now known as Coqueiro or Morrinho).

The access to the village is by Rodovia Governador Mário Covas, also known as Rio-Santos highway.

== History ==
The first record of Mambucaba may be the Tamoio village of Mambucaba, which is cited in the 1557 book História Verídica e Descrição de uma Terra de Selvagens by the German mercenary Hans Staden, which established contact with the local Indians in the 16th century. Faced with the occupation of the region by the Portuguese in that century, the Indians would have remained on the south bank of the river, where they would frequently attack the Portuguese who settled on the north bank (site of the present village). The Portuguese were forced to maintain vigilance in the face of the threat. The Europeans remained there and established an important point of whale hunting for the production of whale oil. It is worth noting that these places were of such importance to the Kingdom of Portugal that their establishment could be only authorized by the king himself.

From the end of the 18th to the 19th century, the village was an important exporter of coffee and importer of slaves to the Vale do Paraíba, located at the mouth of the Mambucaba River, since those who were brought to the municipality of Rio de Janeiro, came in vessels to the islands situated in front of the village and, there, their screening and forwarding to the farms inland was done. House were built in the village during the Golden Age of coffee plantation, a church dedicated to Our Lady of the Rosary, reasonable commerce activity, with records of an establishment for a Vice consul of France.

With the decadence of the port, after the railway connection between São Paulo and Rio de Janeiro in 1872, the village went through decades of abandonment and economic lethargy. In 1968, it was listed by the National Institute of Historic and Artistic Heritage — IPHAN, the historic village of Mambucaba is one of the Brazilian historical sites that were listed in its entirety, not only the buildings, with the urban layout and equipment related to the occupation of the site as well.

The construction of the Rio-Santos highway in the early 1970s threatened the village, generating several protests of cultural movements of the society in Angra dos Reis. In that decade, the existing police station was deactivated, and a military police company installed in barracks on the edge of the highway, now with the purpose of providing protection to the construction works of the nuclear power plant.

== Etymology ==
The name, of indigenous origin, has a controversial meaning. Some people claim that it derives from Mambuca, a small stingless bee better known as "Japurá", a bee-dog abundant in the region. Some others refer to a very abundant plant in the region. There are still others who advocate the meaning as "passage". This last interpretation seeks origin in the fact that, by bordering the river, we have a path that was already used by the Indians of the region as means of connection with the Planalto Paulista. This path came to have long rocky sidewalks built by African slaves for disposal of coffee production.

The name "Mambucaba" also designates the river that finds the sea, having its source in the state of São Paulo, within the Serra da Bocaina National Park, in the municipality of São José do Barreiro. Within the Fluminense territory, the river marks the boundary between the municipalities of Angra dos Reis and Paraty. With this, according to historian Alípio Mendes, the name Mambucaba can also mean "sea loch", since the Mambucaba river waters into the sea, as if it were an extension of it.

== Village and neighborhood ==
Nowadays, the old village, which keeps much of its colonial houses, is a point of vacationers that come from other regions of the west of the state of Rio de Janeiro, the city of Rio de Janeiro and the state of São Paulo. It has about 700 inhabitants, reaching approximately 10,000 visitors in the summer. Its infrastructure has had great improvements in recent years, having practically all streets received pavement and public lighting. A health post and a school are also offered to the local population by the municipality of Angra dos Reis.

There is also residential villages maintained by the Eletrobras, the state energy company for employees of the Angra Nuclear Power Plant. In the neighborhood, Parque Mambucaba, known until a few years ago as Perequê (which means "Path of ascent of the fish", due to the mangrove areas on its shores where the fish reproduce), reside around 21000 people, population that multiply on weekends and holidays during the summer months, when the influx of people come mainly from the region of Vale do Paraíba, and those who have summer residences there. In the last 15 years, this neighborhood has won a reasonable infrastructure for the trade and provision of public and private services, since many workers and former workers of the nuclear power plant resolved to reside permanently, due to the proximity of other localities with access to the sea, as well as the ease of access to Rodovia Rio-Santos.

This region is attended, in relation to public security and civil defense, by the 33 battalion of Military police, whose headquarters is located at the entrance of Parque Mambucaba, and by the 1st Detachment of the 26th group of Military Fireman, located in the working village. Another hospital is located in the neighborhood of Praia Brava and is maintained by Eletronuclear. There are other health posts and a detachment of the Municipal Civil Defense of Angra dos Reis held in Mambucaba Park.
