= Sarapuí River (Rio de Janeiro) =

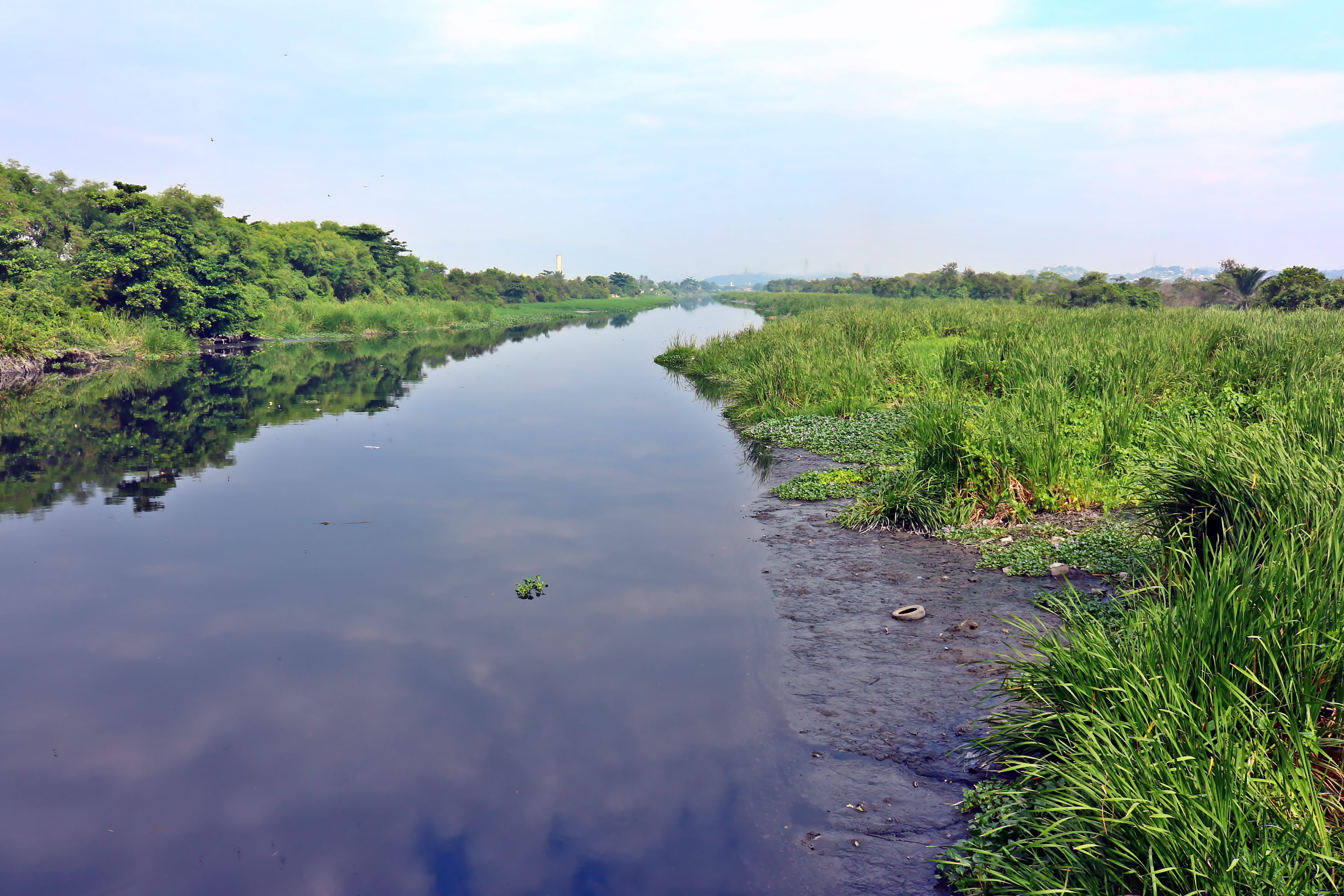
- Sarapuí River in Duque de Caxias

Location
- Country: Brazil

Physical characteristics
- Source
  - location: Rio de Janeiro state
- Mouth: Iguaçu River
  - coordinates: 22°44′S 43°15′W

The Sarapuí River is a river of Rio de Janeiro state in southeastern Brazil.

== See also ==
- List of rivers of Rio de Janeiro
