= Imbé River =

- Mouth location in Brazil
- Native name: Rio do Imbé (Portuguese)

Location
- Country: Brazil

Physical characteristics
- Source
  - location: Rio de Janeiro (state)
- Mouth
  - location: Lagoa de Cima
  - coordinates: 21°47′48″S 41°33′26″W

Basin features
- River system: Ururaí River

The Imbé River (Portuguese: Rio do Imbé) is a river in the state of Rio de Janeiro, Brazil.

The Segundo do Norte, Morumbeca, Aleluia and Mocotó rivers, which rise in the Desengano State Park, are tributaries of the Imbé River. The Imbé flows into the Lagoa de Cima (Cima Lake). From that lake the Ururaí River flows to the Lagoa Feia.

== See also ==
- List of rivers of Rio de Janeiro

== Sources ==
- Parque Estadual do Desengano (in Portuguese), Via Rural, archived from the original on 2017-01-13
