= Macaé de Cima Environmental Protection Area =

State-level environmental protection area in the state of Rio de Janeiro, Brazil

- Área de Proteção Ambiental Estadual Macaé de Cima
- IUCN category V (protected landscape/seascape)
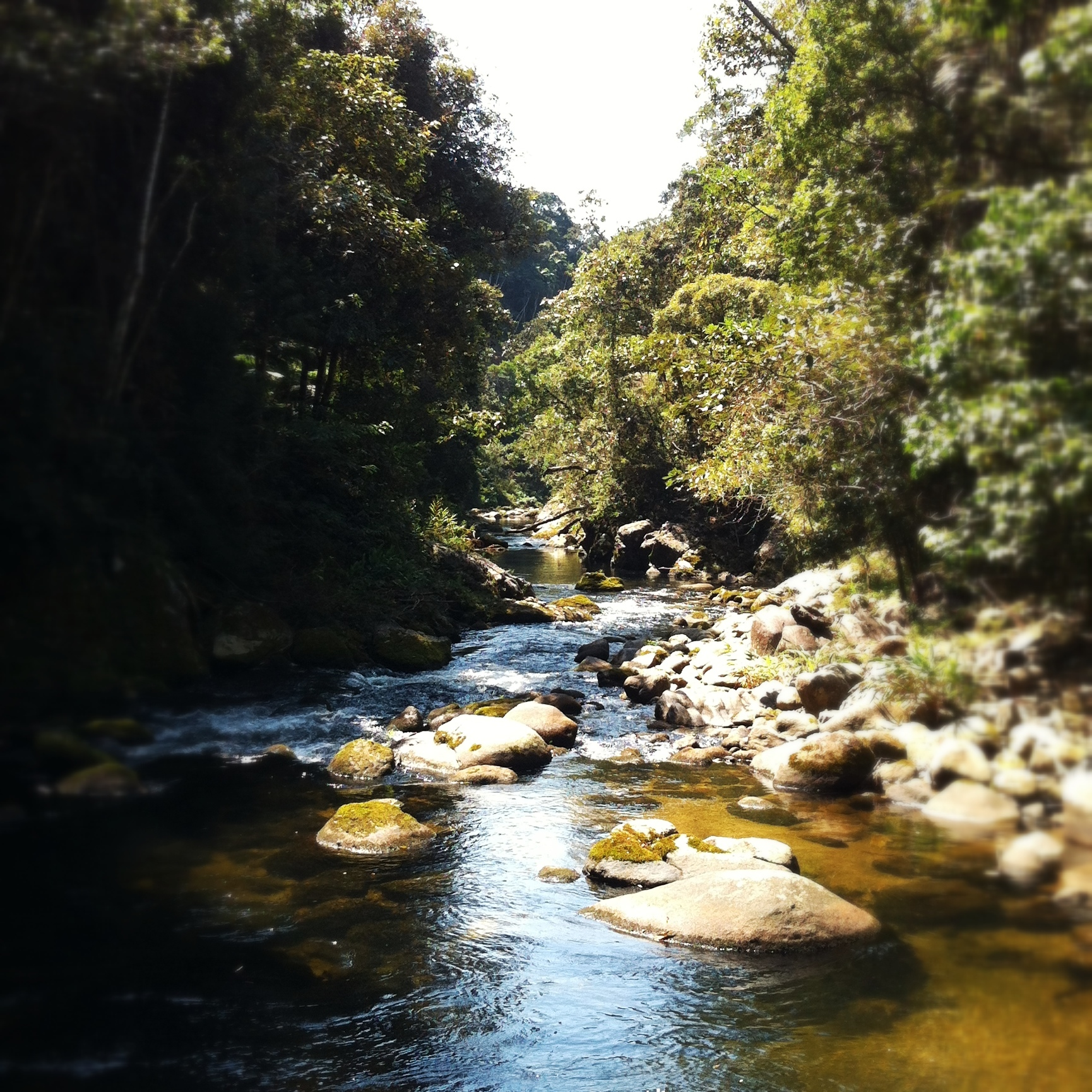
- Macaé River in Macaé de Cima, Nova Friburgo

- Location within Brazil
- Nearest city: Nova Friburgo, Rio de Janeiro
- Coordinates: 22°22′26″S 42°23′42″W
- Area: 35,038 hectares (86,580 acres)
- Designation: Environmental protection area
- Created: 14 September 2001
- Administrator: INEA: Instituto Estadual do Ambiente

The Macaé de Cima Environmental Protection Area (Portuguese: Área de Proteção Ambiental Estadual Macaé de Cima) is a state-level environmental protection area in the state of Rio de Janeiro, Brazil. It protects an area of Atlantic Forest in the Serra do Mar mountains.

== Location ==
The Macaé de Cima Environmental Protection Area (APA) covers an area of 35,038 hectares (86,580 acres). 33,992 hectares (84,000 acres) are in the southern part of the municipality of Nova Friburgo, and 1,045 hectares (2,580 acres) are in the north of the municipality of Casimiro de Abreu. The APA adjoins the municipalities of Macaé, Trajano de Morais, Bom Jardim, Cachoeiras de Macacu and Silva Jardim. It lies completely within the basin of the Macaé River. The RJ-142 highway between the cities of Nova Friburgo and Casimiro de Abreu runs through the APA beside the Macaé River.

The APA overlaps with the Rio Bonito and Macaé de Cima municipal environmental protection areas and the Três Picos State Park. It is in the Central Rio de Janeiro Atlantic Forest Mosaic, created in 2006.

== History ==
The Macaé de Cima Environmental Protection Area was created by state decree 29.213 of 14 September 2001. It was created to protect a remnant of the dense rainforest that once covered the entire Serra do Mar, which is home to rare, endangered or endemic native species, and to protect the headwaters of the Macaé de Cima, Bonito, Das Flores and Santo Antônio rivers.

== Environment ==
The terrain is mostly rugged, with altitudes that range from 191 to 1,892 metres (627 to 6,207 ft). The climate is wet, with average annual rainfall of 1,500 to 2,000 millimetres (59 to 79 in). September is the driest month and December is the wettest. Vegetation is montane or submontane rainforest. Fauna found in the APA include the white-bearded antshrike (Biatas nigropectus), sloth, cougar (Puma concolor), ocelot (Leopardus pardalis), southern tamandua (Tamandua tetradactyla), buffy-tufted marmoset (Callithrix aurita), hawk, falcon, toucan, howler monkey, capybara, paca, armadillo, common agouti, jaguarundi and deer.

== Human activities ==
There are several places of natural beauty that the public uses for leisure and recreation, but generally they are in private areas. A considerable amount of research is conducted in the APA, particularly by the Rio de Janeiro Botanical Garden and Fluminense Federal University. The APA is suitable for tourism in contact with nature, bathing in the rivers and waterfalls, birdwatching and extreme outdoor sports such as kayaking, rafting, trekking, mountain biking, rappelling and tree climbing. Threats include real estate speculation, sewage, hunting, deforestation to expand pasturage, growth of banana cultivation and lack of communication.

== Sources ==
- APA de Macaé de Cima: Informações úteis (in Portuguese), INEA: Instituto Estadual do Ambiente
- Costa, Cláudia; Lamas, Ivana; Fernandes, Rosan (December 2010), Planejamento Estratégico do Mosaico Central Fluminense (PDF) (in Portuguese), Reserva da Biosfera da Mata Atlântica, archived from the original (PDF) on 2016-10-07
- Luiz Dias da Mota Lima (2014), Plano de Manejo da Área de Proteção Ambiental Estadual Macaé de Cima (PDF) (in Portuguese), vol. 1 - Informações Gerais sobre a UC, Rio de Janeiro, archived from the original (PDF) on 2016-10-12
