= Saracuruna River =

Location
- Country: Brazil

Physical characteristics
- Source
  - location: Rio de Janeiro state
- Mouth
  - location: Duque de Caxias, Guanabara Bay
  - coordinates: 22°41′S 43°13′W
  - elevation: sea level

The Saracuruna River is a river in Rio de Janeiro state, located in southeastern Brazil.

It flows through the city of Duque de Caxias, to its mouth on Guanabara Bay.

== See also ==
- List of rivers of Rio de Janeiro
