= Ubatiba River =

Location
- Country: Brazil

Physical characteristics
- Source
  - location: Rio de Janeiro state
- Mouth: Maricá Lagoon
  - coordinates: 22°54′S 42°49′W

The Ubatiba River is a river of Rio de Janeiro state in southeastern Brazil.

== See also ==
- List of rivers of Rio de Janeiro
