= Guandu-Mirim River =

Coordinates: 22°52′S 43°40′W

Location
- Country: Brazil

Physical characteristics
- Source
  - location: Rio de Janeiro state

The Guandu-Mirim River is in the state of Rio de Janeiro in southeastern Brazil.

== See also ==
- List of rivers of Rio de Janeiro
