= Una River (Rio de Janeiro) =

Location
- Country: Brazil

Physical characteristics
- Source
  - location: Rio de Janeiro state
- Mouth: Atlantic Ocean
  - coordinates: 22°42′S 42°1′W

The Una River is a river of Rio de Janeiro state in southeastern Brazil. The river born of Araruama lagoon. It flows through fields north of Tamoios and São Pedro da Aldeia in the Baixadas mesoregion before it discharges into the Atlantic Ocean.

== See also ==
- List of rivers of Rio de Janeiro
