= Dos Poços River =

Location
- Country: Brazil

Physical characteristics
- Source
  - location: Rio de Janeiro state
- Mouth: Queimados River
  - coordinates: 22°46′S 43°37′W

The Dos Poços River is a river of Rio de Janeiro state in southeastern Brazil. It is a tributary of the Queimados River.

== See also ==
- List of rivers of Rio de Janeiro
