= Urubu River =

There are several rivers named Urubu River in Brazil:

- Urubu River (Amazonas)
- Urubu River (Rio de Janeiro)
- Urubu River (Roraima), a river of Roraima
- Urubu Grande River
