= Piraí River (Rio de Janeiro) =

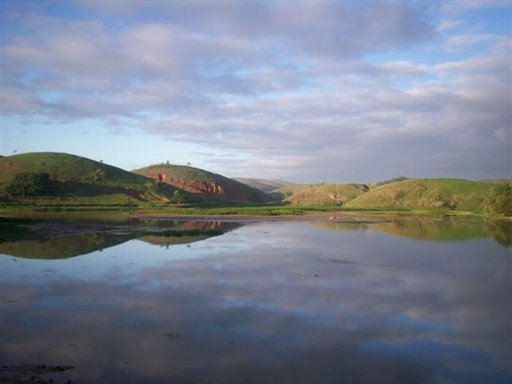

Location
- Country: Brazil

Physical characteristics
- Source
  - location: Rio de Janeiro state
- Mouth: Paraíba do Sul
  - coordinates: 22°28′S 43°50′W

The Piraí River is in the state of Rio de Janeiro in southeastern Brazil.

== See also ==
- List of rivers of Rio de Janeiro
