= Grande River (Rio de Janeiro) =

Location
- Country: Brazil

Physical characteristics
- Source
  - location: Rio de Janeiro state
- Mouth: Arroio Fundo
  - coordinates: 22°57′S 43°21′W

The Grande River is a river of Rio de Janeiro state in southeastern Brazil. It flows through the city of Rio de Janeiro, is briefly renamed Arroio Fundo, and discharges into the Comorim Lagoon.

== See also ==
- List of rivers of Rio de Janeiro
