= Pirapetinga River (upper Paraíba do Sul) =

Location
- Country: Brazil

Physical characteristics
- Source
  - location: Rio de Janeiro state
- Mouth: Paraíba do Sul
  - coordinates: 22°28′S 44°24′W

The Pirapetinga River is a river of Rio de Janeiro state in southeastern Brazil. It is a tributary of the Paraíba do Sul.

== See also ==
- List of rivers of Rio de Janeiro
