= Barra Mansa River =

Coordinates: 22°33′S 44°10′W

Location
- Country: Brazil

Physical characteristics
- Source
  - location: Rio de Janeiro state

The Barra Mansa River is a river of Rio de Janeiro state in southeastern Brazil.

== See also ==
- List of rivers of Rio de Janeiro
