= Frades River =

The Frades River or Rio dos Frades (Friars' River) may refer to:

- Dos Frades River, a river in the Brazilian state of Rio de Janeiro
- Frades River (Bahia), a river in the Brazilian state of Bahia
