= Rio Grande (Dois Rios) =

Location
- Country: Brazil

Physical characteristics
- Source
  - location: Rio de Janeiro state
- Mouth: Dois Rios River
  - coordinates: 21°44′S 41°56′W

The Rio Grande (Portuguese for "great river") is a river of Rio de Janeiro state in southeastern Brazil. It is a tributary of the Dois Rios River.

== See also ==
- List of rivers of Rio de Janeiro
