= Da Guarda River =

Location
- Country: Brazil

Physical characteristics
- Source
  - location: Rio de Janeiro state
- Mouth: Atlantic Ocean
  - coordinates: 22°55′S 43°48′W

The Da Guarda River is a river of Rio de Janeiro state in southeastern Brazil.

== See also ==
- List of rivers of Rio de Janeiro
