= Faria Timbó River =

Location
- Country: Brazil

Physical characteristics
- Source
  - location: Rio de Janeiro state
- Mouth: Guanabara Bay
  - coordinates: 22°53′S 43°15′W

The Faria Timbó River is a river of Rio de Janeiro state in southeastern Brazil.

== See also ==
- List of rivers of Rio de Janeiro
