= Carmo, Rio de Janeiro =

Carmo
- Municipality
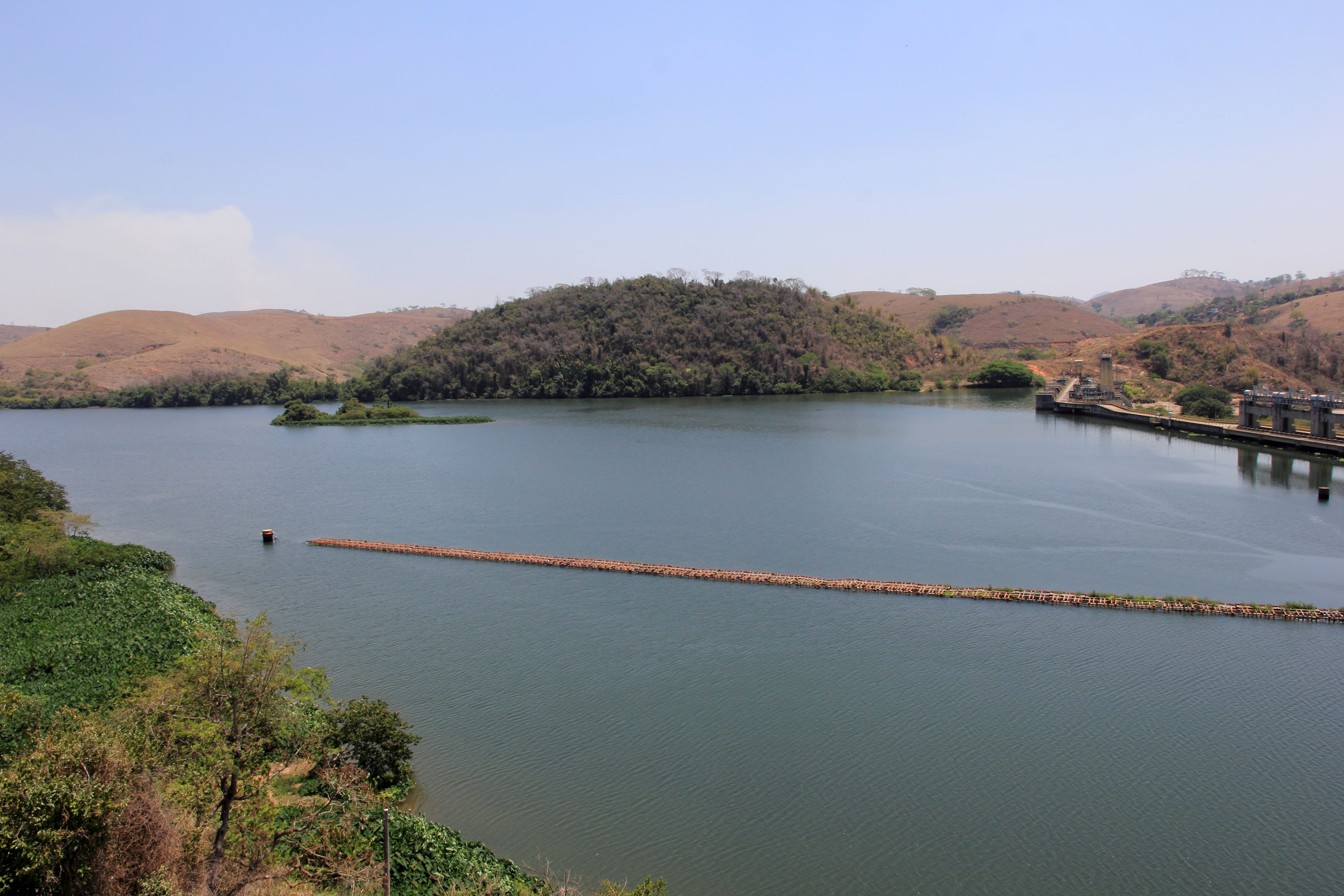
- Ilha dos Pombos hydropower plant

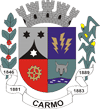
- Flag Coat of arms
- Nickname: Cidade Bela
- Location of Carmo in the state of Rio de Janeiro

- Location of Carmo in Brazil
- Coordinates: 21°56′02″S 42°36′32″W
- Country: Brazil
- Region: Southeast
- State: Rio de Janeiro

Government
  - Prefeito: Paulo Cezar Gonçalves Ladeira (PSB)

Area
  - Total: 321.187 km^{2} (124.011 sq mi)
- Elevation: 347 m (1,138 ft)

Population (2020)
  - Total: 19,030
- Time zone: UTC-3 (UTC-3)

Carmo (Portuguese pronunciation: [ˈkaʁmu]) is a municipality in the Brazilian state of Rio de Janeiro. Its nickname is the Cidade Bela (Beautiful City).

== Geography ==
Carmo encompasses an area of about 320 square kilometres (120 mi^{2}).

Its current population is estimated to be more than 19,000 inhabitants, of which 72.3% live in the suburban area.

The municipality neighbors Sumidouro, Cantagalo, Duas Barras, Sapucaia, as well as bordering Além Paraíba.

Part of the city is situated in the basin of the Paquequer River, one of the last tributaries of the Paraíba do Sul that has little aquatic pollution.

== Climate ==
Climate data for Carmo, Rio de Janeiro (1981–2010)
Month	Jan	Feb	Mar	Apr	May	Jun	Jul	Aug	Sep	Oct	Nov	Dec	Year
Mean daily maximum °C (°F)	32.2 (90.0)	33.3 (91.9)	32.3 (90.1)	31.0 (87.8)	28.4 (83.1)	27.3 (81.1)	27.1 (80.8)	28.5 (83.3)	28.9 (84.0)	29.9 (85.8)	30.7 (87.3)	31.5 (88.7)	30.1 (86.2)
Mean daily minimum °C (°F)	21.3 (70.3)	21.3 (70.3)	20.8 (69.4)	19.2 (66.6)	16.4 (61.5)	14.5 (58.1)	13.9 (57.0)	14.8 (58.6)	16.8 (62.2)	18.8 (65.8)	20.1 (68.2)	20.9 (69.6)	18.2 (64.8)
Average precipitation mm (inches)	237.3 (9.34)	134.7 (5.30)	147.9 (5.82)	74.6 (2.94)	45.1 (1.78)	18.0 (0.71)	18.3 (0.72)	18.7 (0.74)	63.4 (2.50)	105.1 (4.14)	179.7 (7.07)	286.8 (11.29)	1,329.6 (52.35)
Average precipitation days (≥ 1.0 mm)	15	10	11	6	5	3	3	3	6	8	13	16	99
Source: Instituto Nacional de Meteorologia
