= Da Barra Grande River =

Location
- Country: Brazil

Physical characteristics
- Source
  - location: Rio de Janeiro state
- Mouth: Ribeira Bay
  - coordinates: 23°6′S 44°42′W

The Da Barra Grande River is a river of Rio de Janeiro state in southeastern Brazil.

== See also ==
- List of rivers of Rio de Janeiro
