= Mambucaba River =

Coordinates: 23°01′37″S 44°31′16″W

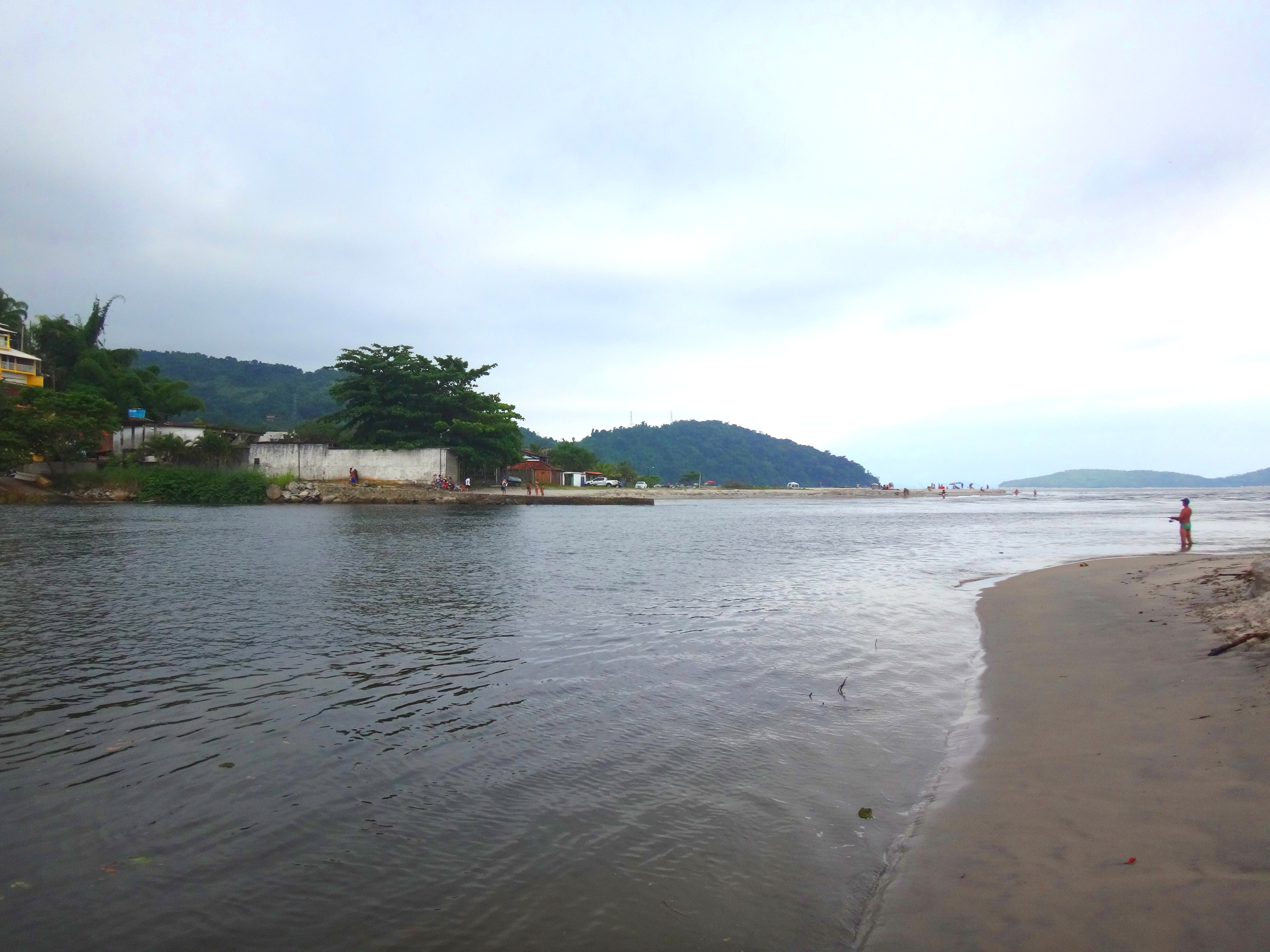

Location
- Country: Brazil

Physical characteristics
- Source
  - location: Rio de Janeiro state

The Mambucaba River is a river of Rio de Janeiro state in southeastern Brazil. It lies adjacent to the historic village of Mambucaba.

== See also ==
- List of rivers of Rio de Janeiro
