= Bananal River (Paraíba do Sul) =

- Location within Brazil
- Native name: Rio Bananal (Portuguese)

Location
- Country: Brazil

Physical characteristics
- Mouth
  - location: Barra Mansa, RJ
  - coordinates: 22.514973°S 44.195474°W

Basin features
- River system: Paraíba do Sul

The Bananal River (Portuguese: Rio Bananal) is a river of the states of São Paulo and Rio de Janeiro in southeastern Brazil. It is a tributary of the Paraíba do Sul.

The headwaters are protected by the 292,000 hectares (720,000 acres) Mananciais do Rio Paraíba do Sul Environmental Protection Area, created in 1982 to protect the sources of the Paraíba do Sul river.

== See also ==
- List of rivers of Rio de Janeiro
- List of rivers of São Paulo
