= Guaxindiba River =

- Location within Brazil
- Native name: Rio Guaxindiba (Portuguese)

Location
- Country: Brazil

Physical characteristics
- Source
  - location: Rio de Janeiro state
- Mouth
  - location: Guanabara Bay
  - coordinates: 22°44′36″S 43°01′35″W
  - elevation: 0 m (0 ft)

The Guaxindiba River (Portuguese: Rio Guaxindiba) is a river of Rio de Janeiro state in southeastern Brazil.

The Guaxindiba River flows through a flat region of mangroves in the 1,936 hectares (4,780 acres) Guanabara Ecological Station before discharging into the east of Guanabara Bay near the city of Rio de Janeiro.

== See also ==
- List of rivers of Rio de Janeiro
