= Jequiá River (Rio de Janeiro) =

Location
- Country: Brazil

Physical characteristics
- Source
  - location: Rio de Janeiro state
- Mouth: Guanabara Bay
  - coordinates: 22°49′S 43°11′W

The Jequiá River is a river of Rio de Janeiro state in southeastern Brazil.

== See also ==
- List of rivers of Rio de Janeiro
