= Carangola River =

Coordinates: 21°12′24″S 41°55′39″W

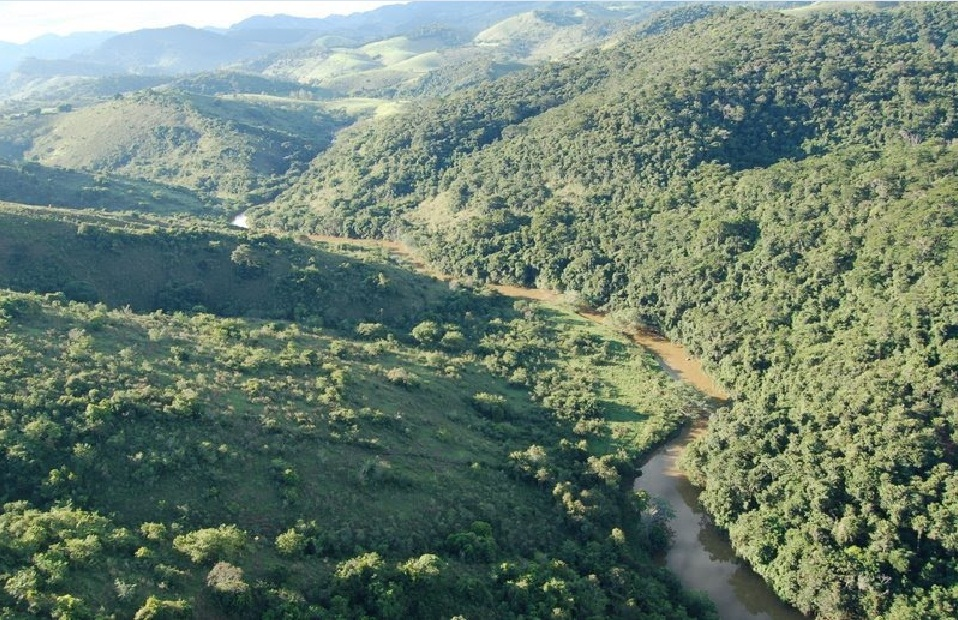

Location
- Country: Brazil

Physical characteristics
- Source
  - location: Minas Gerais state
- Mouth
  - location: Rio de Janeiro state

The Carangola River is a river of Minas Gerais and Rio de Janeiro states in southeastern Brazil.

== See also ==
- List of rivers of Minas Gerais
