= Estrela River =

Location
- Country: Brazil

Physical characteristics
- Source
  - location: Rio de Janeiro state
- Mouth: Guanabara Bay
  - coordinates: 22°44′S 43°13′W

The Estrela River is a river of Rio de Janeiro state in southeastern Brazil. It flows in Guanabara Bay.

== See also ==
- List of rivers of Rio de Janeiro
