= Macacu River =

River in Brazil

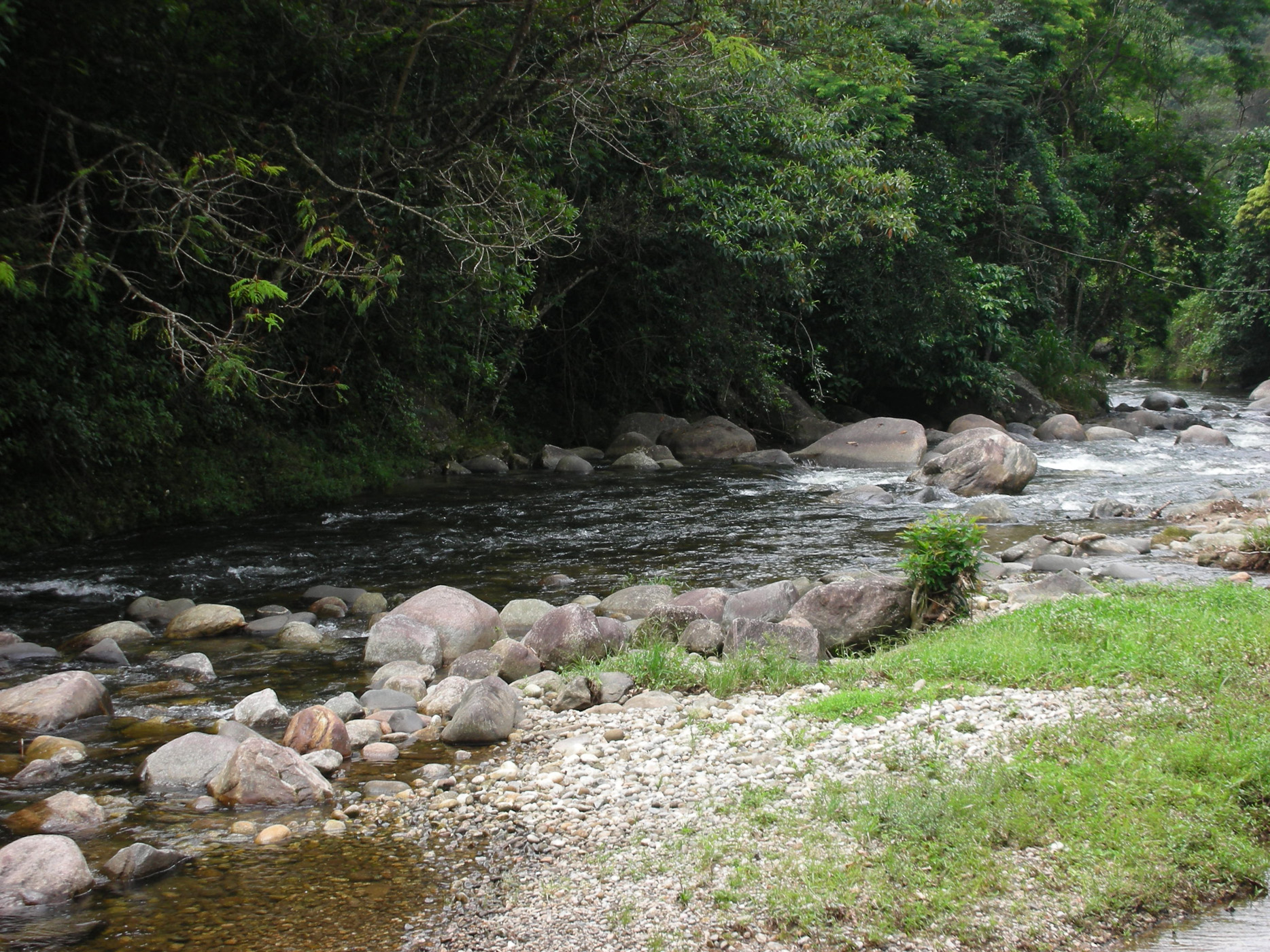
- Rio Macacu in Boca do Mato

- Location within Brazil
- Native name: Rio Macacu (Portuguese)

Location
- Country: Brazil

Physical characteristics
- Source
  - location: Rio de Janeiro state
- Mouth
  - location: Guanabara Bay
  - coordinates: 22.693625°S 43.033074°W
  - elevation: 0 m (0 ft)

The Macacu River (Portuguese: Rio Macacu) is a river of Rio de Janeiro state in southeastern Brazil.

== Course ==
The Macacu River is born in the Serra dos Órgãos at about 1,700 metres (5,600 ft) in the municipality of Cachoeiras de Macacu, and runs for about 74 kilometres (46 mi) to its junction with the Guapimirim River. The basin of the Macacu River is partly protected by the 19,508 hectares (48,210 acres) Bacia do Rio Macacu Environmental Protection Area, part of the Central Rio de Janeiro Atlantic Forest Mosaic. The Macacu River flows through a flat region of mangroves in the 1,936 hectares (4,780 acres) Guanabara Ecological Station before discharging into the east of Guanabara Bay near the city of Rio de Janeiro.

== See also ==
- List of rivers of Rio de Janeiro

== Sources ==
- Costa, Cláudia; Lamas, Ivana; Fernandes, Rosan (December 2010), Planejamento Estratégico do Mosaico Central Fluminense (PDF) (in Portuguese), Reserva da Biosfera da Mata Atlântica, archived from the original (PDF) on 2016-10-07
- RJ - Cachoeiras de Macacu (in Portuguese), MMA: Ministério do Meio Ambiente
- Unidade de Conservação: Estação Ecológica da Guanabara (in Portuguese), MMA: Ministério do Meio Ambiente
