= São João River (Rio de Janeiro) =

- Location within Brazil
- Native name: Rio São João (Portuguese)

Location
- Country: Brazil

Physical characteristics
- Source
  - location: Rio de Janeiro state
- Mouth
  - location: Rio das Ostras, Rio de Janeiro
  - coordinates: 22.596335°S 41.991697°W

The São João River is a river of Rio de Janeiro state in southeastern Brazil. It runs into the Atlantic at Rio das Ostras.

Its basin includes part of the União Biological Reserve, home to a population of endangered golden lion tamarin.

== See also ==
- List of rivers of Rio de Janeiro
