= Guandu River (Rio de Janeiro) =

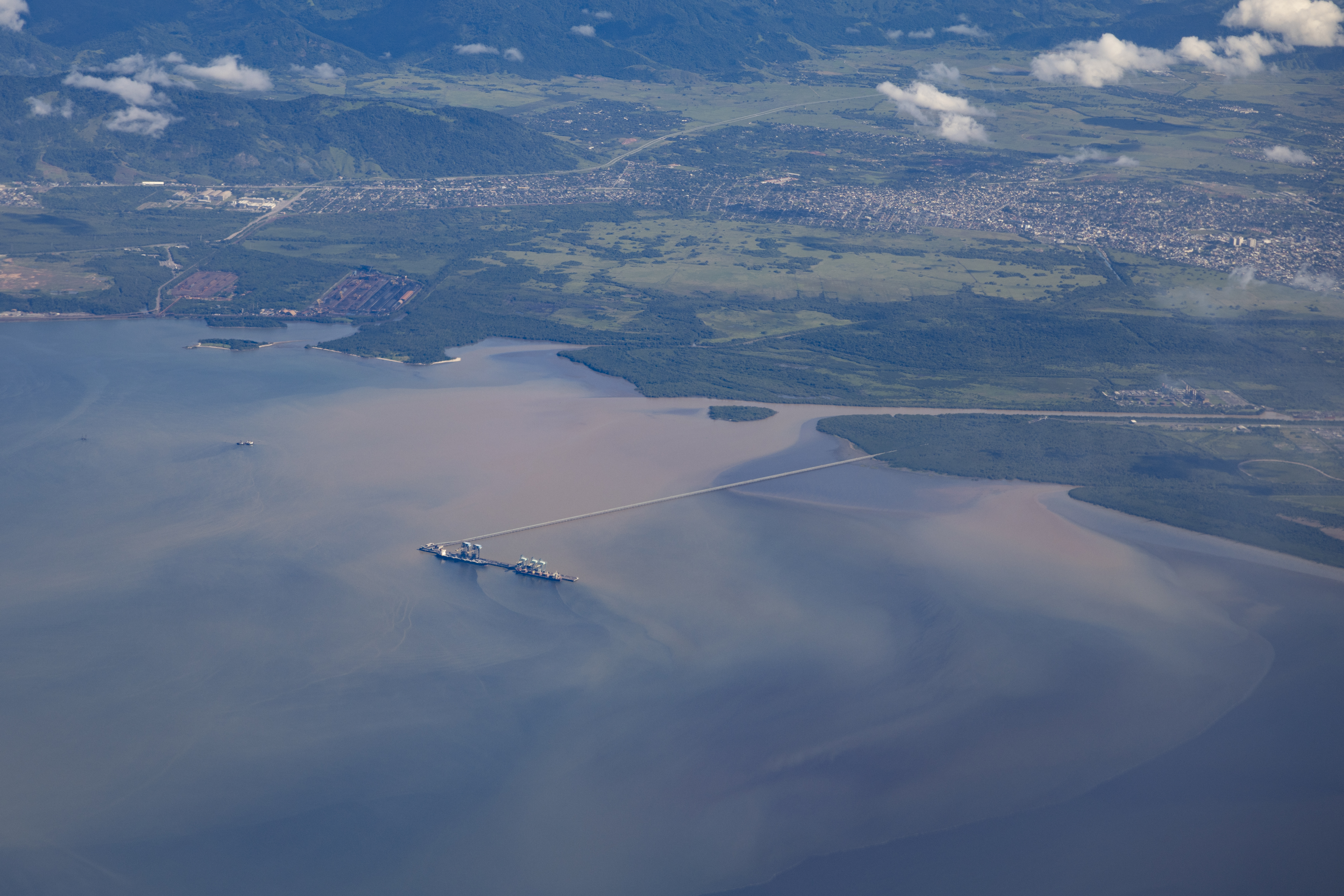

Location
- Country: Brazil

Physical characteristics
- Source
  - location: Rio de Janeiro state
- Mouth: Atlantic Ocean
  - coordinates: 22°57′S 43°45′W
- Length: 108.5 km (67.4 mi)

The Guandu River is a river of Rio de Janeiro state in southeastern Brazil. This river together with the Paraíba do Sul River are the most important in the Rio de Janeiro state.

The river supplies water to 9 million people in Greater Rio de Janeiro. Many tributaries of the river rise in the 4,398 hectares (10,870 acres) Mendanha State Park, created in 2013. An aqueduct carries the water across the Pedra Branca State Park to Rio's south zone.

== Pollution ==
Guandu river is heavily polluted since it receives everything from raw sewage to industrial waste throughout its course.

The pollution problem is so serious that it threatens the water supply of the Rio de Janeiro metropolitan area. CEDAE, the water and sewer company of the state, recognizes that the problem is very serious. CEDAE also admits that because of the high levels of pollution, purification of Guandu's waters is a challenge.

== See also ==
- List of rivers of Rio de Janeiro
