= Ururaí River =

Ururahy River
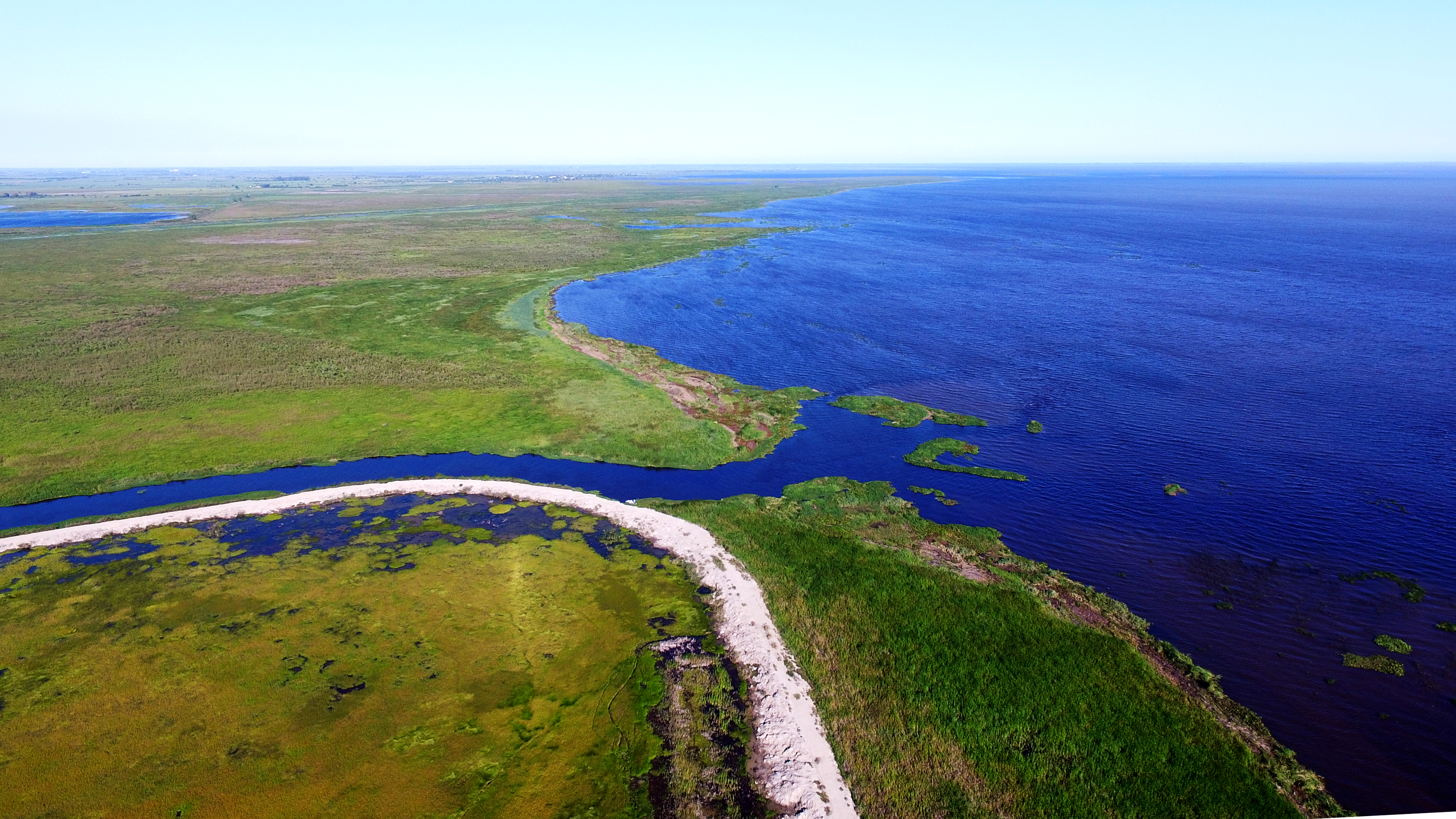

Location
- Country: Brazil

Physical characteristics
- Source
  - location: Rio de Janeiro state
- Mouth: Feia Lake
  - coordinates: 21°58′S 41°21′W

The Ururahy River is a river of Rio de Janeiro state in southeastern Brazil.

== See also ==
- List of rivers of Rio de Janeiro
