= Preto River (Paraibuna River tributary) =

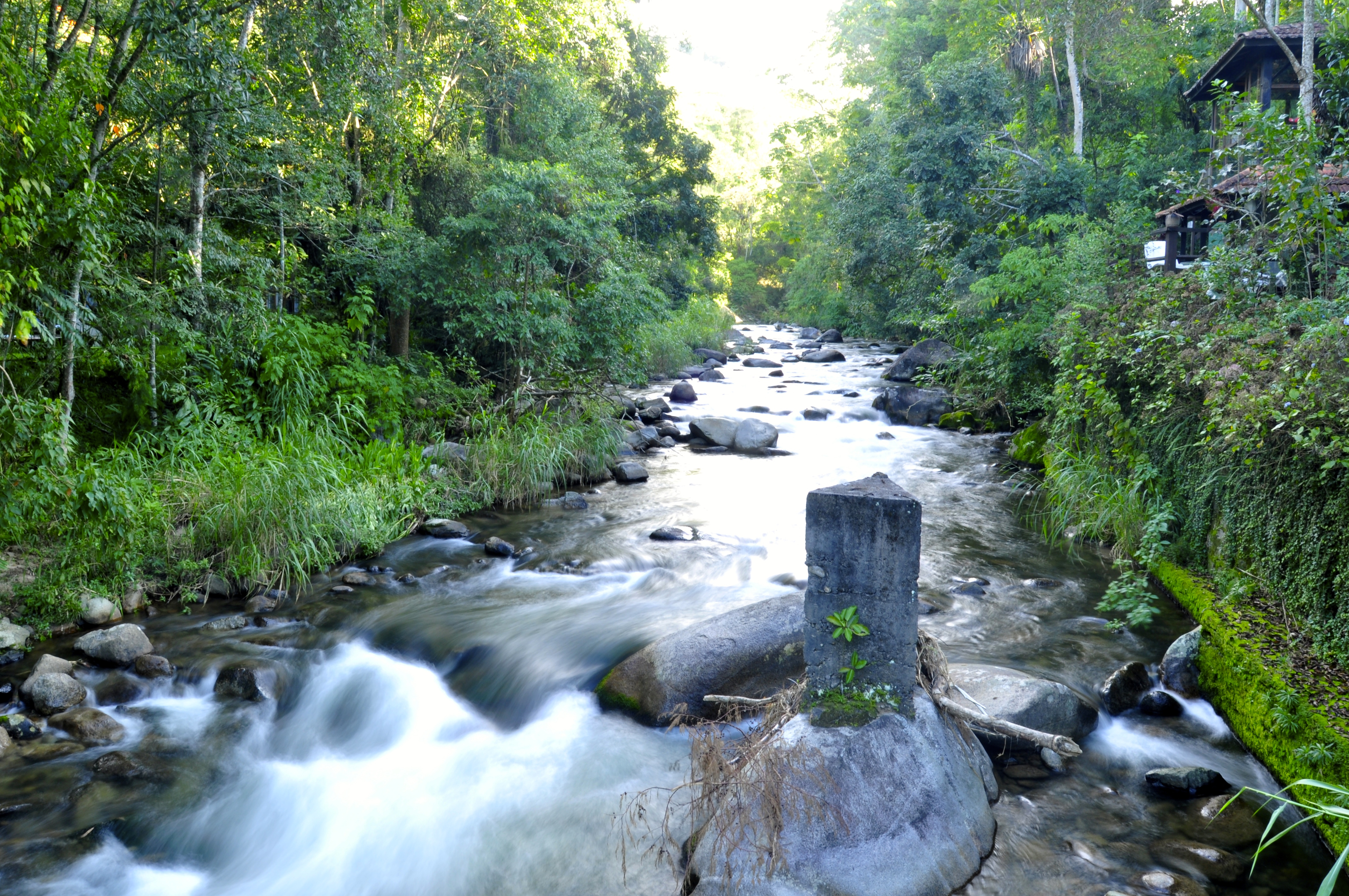

- Location within Brazil

Location
- Country: Brazil

Physical characteristics
- Source
  - location: Minas Gerais state
- Mouth: Paraibuna River
  - coordinates: 22°0′S 43°19′W

The Preto River is a river of Minas Gerais state in southeastern Brazil. It is a tributary of the Paraibuna River.

== See also ==
- List of rivers of Minas Gerais
