= Macabu River =

Coordinates: 21°59′13″S 41°26′18″W

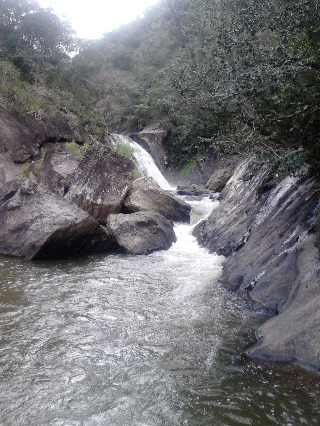

Location
- Country: Brazil

Physical characteristics
- Source
  - location: Rio de Janeiro state

The Macabu River is a river of Rio de Janeiro state in southeastern Brazil.

== See also ==
- List of rivers of Rio de Janeiro
