= Preto River (Piabanha River tributary) =

Location
- Country: Brazil

Physical characteristics
- Source
  - location: Rio de Janeiro state
- Mouth: Piabanha River
  - coordinates: 22°14′S 43°7′W

The Preto River is a river of Rio de Janeiro state in southeastern Brazil. It is a tributary of the Piabanha River.

== See also ==
- List of rivers of Rio de Janeiro
