= Macaé River =

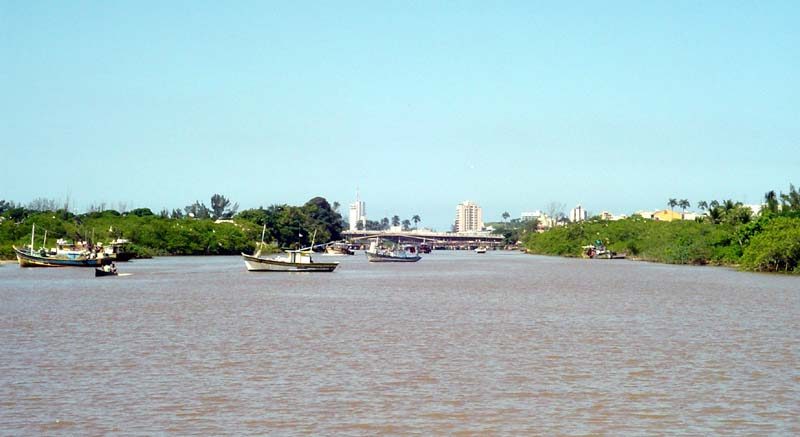

- Location within Brazil
- Native name: Rio Macaé (Portuguese)

Location
- Country: Brazil

Physical characteristics
- Source
  - location: Rio de Janeiro state
- Mouth
  - location: Macaé, Rio de Janeiro
  - coordinates: 22.374007°S 41.775739°W
  - elevation: 0 m (0 ft)

The Macaé River is a river of Rio de Janeiro state in southeastern Brazil that flows into the Atlantic Ocean at the town of Macaé.

The upper part of the Macaé River basin is protected by the 35,038-hectare (86,580-acre) Macaé de Cima Environmental Protection Area, created in 2001. The river basin also includes part of the União Biological Reserve, home to a population of endangered golden lion tamarin.

== See also ==
- List of rivers of Rio de Janeiro
