= Turvo River =

Turvo River may refer to several rivers in Brazil:

- Turvo River (Goiás)
- Turvo River (Grande River)
- Turvo River (Itapetininga River)
- Turvo River (Minas Gerais)
- Turvo River (Paraná)
- Turvo River (Paranapanema River)
- Turvo River (Pardo River)
- Turvo River (Rio de Janeiro)
- Turvo River (Rio Grande do Sul)
