= Quilombo River =

Quilombo River may refer to:

- Quilombo River (Juquiá River), Brazil
- Quilombo River (Moji-Guaçu River), Brazil
