= Alambari River =

Alambari River may refer to one of the following rivers in Brazil:

- Alambari River (Tietê River)
- Alambari River (Turvo River)
