= List of rivers of São Paulo =

List of rivers in São Paulo (Brazilian State).

The list is arranged by drainage basin from north to south, with respective tributaries indented under each larger stream's name and ordered from downstream to upstream. All rivers in São Paulo drain to the Atlantic Ocean.

== By Drainage Basin ==
=== Atlantic Coast ===
- Paraíba do Sul
  - Barra Mansa River
  - Bananal River
  - Barreiro de Baixo River
  - Sesmarias River
  - Do Salto River
  - Itagacaba River
  - Bocaina River
  - Guaratinguetá River
  - Buquira River
  - Jaguari River
    - Parateí River (Lambari-Parateí River)
    - Do Peixe River
    - Pilões River
  - Itapeti River
  - Paraibuna River
    - Lourenço Velho River
    - Do Peixe River
    - Ipiranga River
  - Paraitinga River
    - Itaim River
    - Jacuí River
  - Comprido River
- Bracuí River
- Mambucaba River
- Puruba River
- Camburu River
- Itapanhaú River
- Cubatão River
- Branco River
- Comprido River
- Guaraú River
- Una do Prelado River
- Ribeira de Iguape River
  - Una da Aldeia River
    - Itimirim River
    - Itinguçu River
      - Espraiado River
    - Das Pedras River
  - Pariquera-Açu River
  - Jacupiranga River
  - Juquiá River
    - Quilombo River
    - São Lourenço River
  - Pardo River
  - Itapirapuã River

=== Paraná Basin ===
- Paraná River
  - Paranapanema River
    - Pirapozinho River
    - Taquaruçu River
    - Capivara River
      - Capivari River
    - Novo River
    - Pardo River
      - Turvo River
        - Alambari River
      - Novo River
      - Claro River
      - Palmital River
    - Itararé River
      - Verde River
      - Da Água Morta River
    - Taquari-Guaçu River
    - Guareí River
    - Apiai-Guaçu River
      - Apiai-Mirim River
        - São José do Guapiara River
    - Itapetininga River
      - Turvo River
      - Pinhal Grande River
    - Das Almas River
  - Santo Anastácio River
  - Do Peixe River
  - Aguapeí River
    - Tibiriça River
  - Tietê River
    - Dourado River
    - Ribeirão Barra Mansa
    - Batalha River
    - São Lourenço River
    - Claro River
    - Jacaré-Guaçu River
      - Chibarro River
      - Boa Esperança River
      - Monjolinho River
    - Jacaré Pepira River
    - Jaú River
    - Ribeirão Grande
      - Bauru River
    - Lençóis River
    - Araguá River
    - Piracicaba River
      - Corumbataí River
        - Passa Cinco River
      - Jaguari River
        - Camanducaia River
      - Atibaia River
        - Anhumas River
          - Das Pedras River
        - Cachoeira River
    - Alambari River
    - Do Peixe River
    - Capivari River
    - Sorocaba River
      - Guarapó River
      - Tatuí River
      - Sarapuí River
    - Avecutá River
    - Jundiaí River
    - Jundiuvira River
    - Juqueri River
    - Cotia River
    - Pinheiros River (Jurabatuba River)
      - Guarapiranga River
        - Embu-Mirim River
        - Embu-Guaçu River
      - Pequeno River
    - Tamanduateí River
      - Anhangabaú River
      - Ipiranga Brook
    - Aricanduva River
    - Cabuçu de Cima River (Guapira River)
    - Baquirivu-Guaçu River
    - Guaio River
    - Taiaçupeba River
      - Taiaçupeba-Mirim River
    - Jundiaí River
    - Biritiba-Mirim River
    - Paraitinga River
    - Claro River
  - São José dos Dourados River
  - Grande River
    - Paulo Diniz River
    - Turvo River
      - Preto River
        - Jataí River
      - Cachoeirinha River
      - São Domingos River
    - Pardo River
      - Velho River
      - Moji-Guaçu River
        - Quilombo River
        - Jaguari Mirim River
        - Itupeva River
        - Oriçanga River
        - Moji-Mirim River
        - Rio do Peixe
      - Araraquara River
      - Canoas River
      - Guaxupé River
    - Sapucai River
      - Sapucai-Mirim River

== Alphabetically ==
- Aguapeí River
- Alambari River
- Alambari River
- Das Almas River
- Anhangabaú River
- Apiai-Guaçu River
- Apiai-Mirim River
- Da Água Morta River
- Araguá River
- Araraquara River
- Aricanduva River
- Atibaia River
- Avecutá River
- Bananal River
- Baquirivu-Guaçu River
- Barra Mansa River
- Ribeirão Barra Mansa
- Barreiro de Baixo River
- Batalha River
- Bauru River
- Biritiba-Mirim River
- Boa Esperança River
- Bocaina River
- Bracuí River
- Branco River
- Buquira River
- Cabuçu de Cima River (Guapira River)
- Cachoeira River
- Cachoeirinha River
- Camanducaia River
- Camburu River
- Canoas River
- Capivara River
- Capivari River
- Capivari River
- Claro River
- Claro River
- Claro River
- Comprido River
- Comprido River
- Corumbataí River
- Cotia River
- Cubatão River
- Dourado River
- Embu-Guaçu River
- Embu-Mirim River
- Grande River
- Ribeirão Grande
- Guaio River
- Guarapó River
- Guarapiranga River
- Guaratinguetá River
- Guareí River
- Guaxupé River
- Ipiranga Brook
- Ipiranga River
- Itaim River
- Itagacaba River
- Itapanhaú River
- Itapeti River
- Itapetininga River
- Itapirapuã River
- Itararé River
- Itimirim River
- Itinguçu River
- Itupeva River
- Jacaré Pepira River
- Jacaré-Guaçu River
- Jacuí River
- Jacupiranga River
- Jaguari River
- Jaguari Mirim River
- Jaguari River
- Jataí River
- Jaú River
- Jundiaí River
- Jundiaí River (upper Tietê River tributary)
- Jundiuvira River
- Juqueri River
- Juquiá River
- Lençóis River
- Lourenço Velho River
- Mambucaba River
- Moji-Guaçu River
- Moji-Mirim River
- Monjolinho River
- Novo River
- Novo River
- Oriçanga River
- Palmital River
- Paraíba do Sul
- Paraibuna River
- Paraitinga River
- Paraitinga River
- Paraná River
- Paranapanema River
- Parateí River (Lambari-Parateí River)
- Pardo River
- Pardo River
- Pardo River
- Pariquera-Açu River
- Passa Cinco River
- Paulo Diniz River
- Das Pedras River
- Das Pedras River
- Do Peixe River
- Rio do Peixe (Mojiguaçu River)
- Do Peixe River
- Do Peixe River
- Do Peixe River
- Pequeno River
- Pilões River
- Pinhal Grande River
- Pinheiros River (Jurabatuba River)
- Piracicaba River
- Pirapozinho River
- Preto River
- Puruba River
- Quilombo River
- Quilombo River
- Ribeira de Iguape River
- Santo Anastácio River
- Do Salto River
- São Domingos River
- São José do Guapiara River
- São José dos Dourados River
- São Lourenço River
- São Lourenço River
- Sapucai River
- Sapucai-Mirim River
- Sarapuí River
- Sesmarias River
- Sorocaba River
- Taiaçupeba River
- Taiaçupeba-Mirim River
- Tamanduateí River
- Taquari-Guaçu River
- Taquaruçu River
- Tatuí River
- Tibiriça River
- Tietê River
- Turvo River
- Turvo River
- Turvo River
- Velho River
- Verde River
