= São Lourenço River =

There are several rivers named São Lourenço River in Brazil:

- São Lourenço River (Juquiá River tributary)
- São Lourenço River (Mato Grosso)
- São Lourenço River (Paraná)
- São Lourenço River (Rio Grande do Sul)
- São Lourenço River (Tietê River tributary)
