= Espraiado River =

- Location within Brazil
- Native name: Rio do Espraiado (Portuguese)

Location
- Country: Brazil

Physical characteristics
- Source
  - location: Pedro de Toledo, São Paulo
- Mouth: Itinguçu River
  - coordinates: 24°26′S 47°27′W
- Length: 35 kilometres (22 mi)

The Espraiado River (Portuguese: Rio do Espraiado) is a river in the south of the state of São Paulo Brazil. It is a tributary of the Una da Aldeia River.

== Course ==
The river originates in the municipality of Pedro de Toledo, São Paulo. It flows along the length of the Despraiado Sustainable Development Reserve and then across the Juréia-Itatins Ecological Station. Known in its lower reaches as the Itinguçu River, it joins the Das Pedras River to form the Una da Aldeia River.

== See also ==
- List of rivers of São Paulo

== Sources ==
- "Estação Ecológica Juréia-Itatins", Wikiaves (in Portuguese)
