= Araraquara River =

Location
- Country: Brazil

Physical characteristics
- Source
  - location: São Paulo state
- Mouth: Pardo River
  - coordinates: 21°13′S 47°30′W

The Araraquara River is a river of São Paulo state in southeastern Brazil.

== See also ==
- List of rivers of São Paulo
