= Brandãozinho =

Brandãozinho is the name of:

- Brandãozinho (footballer, born 1925) (1925–2000), real name Antenor Lucas, Brazilian footballer
- Brandãozinho (footballer, born 1930) (1930–2021), real name José Carlos Silveira Braga, Brazilian footballer
