= Pilões River =

There are two rivers named Pilões River.

== Brazil ==
- Pilões River (Santa Catarina)
- Pilões River (São Paulo)
