= Embu-Guaçu River =

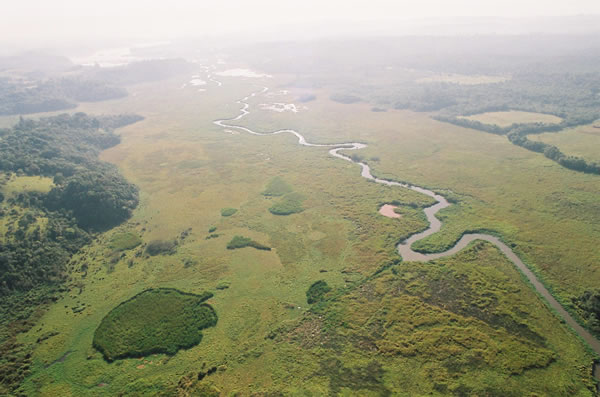

Location
- Country: Brazil

Physical characteristics
- Source
  - location: São Paulo state
- Mouth: Guarapiranga River
  - coordinates: 23°48′S 46°48′W

The Embu-Guaçu River is a river of São Paulo state in southeastern Brazil.

== See also ==
- List of rivers of São Paulo
