= Parateí River =

Location
- Country: Brazil

Physical characteristics
- Source
  - location: São Paulo state
- Mouth: Jaguari River
  - coordinates: 23°12′S 46°0′W

The Parateí River is a river of São Paulo state in southeastern Brazil.

== See also ==
- List of rivers of São Paulo
