= Taiaçupeba-Mirim River =

Location
- Country: Brazil

Physical characteristics
- Source
  - location: São Paulo state
- Mouth: Taiaçupeba River
  - coordinates: 23°37′S 46°16′W

The Taiaçupeba-Mirim River is a river of São Paulo state in southeastern Brazil.

== See also ==
- List of rivers of São Paulo
