= Ipiranga River (São Paulo) =

Location
- Country: Brazil

Physical characteristics
- Source
  - location: São Paulo state
- Mouth: Paraibuna River
  - coordinates: 23°21′S 45°10′W

The Ipiranga River is a river of São Paulo state in southeastern Brazil. It is a tributary of the Paraibuna River.

== See also ==
- List of rivers of São Paulo
