= Sapucaí (disambiguation) =

Sapucaí may refer to the following places:

- Sapucaí, a town in southern Paraguay
- Sapucaí-Mirim, a municipality in Minas Gerais, Brazil
- rivers in Brazil:
  - Sapucaí River (Minas Gerais), a tributary of the Rio Grande in Minas Gerais
  - Sapucaí River (São Paulo), a tributary of the Rio Grande in São Paulo
  - Sapucaí-Mirim River, a tributary of the Sapucaí River (Minas Gerais) in Minas Gerais and São Paulo
- Sambadrome Marquês de Sapucaí, a parade area in Rio de Janeiro, Brazil
