= Do Peixe River (Jaguari River tributary) =

Location
- Country: Brazil

Physical characteristics
- Source
  - location: São Paulo state
- Mouth: Jaguari River
  - coordinates: 23°12′S 46°6′W

The Do Peixe River is a river of São Paulo state in southeastern Brazil. It is a tributary of the Jaguari River.

== See also ==
- List of rivers of São Paulo
