= Passa Cinco River =

Location
- Country: Brazil

Physical characteristics
- Source
  - location: São Paulo state
- Mouth: Corumbatai River
  - coordinates: 22°31′S 47°39′W

The Passa Cinco River is a river of São Paulo state in southeastern Brazil.

== See also ==
- List of rivers of São Paulo
