= Cachoeira River (São Paulo) =

Location
- Country: Brazil

Physical characteristics
- Source
  - location: São Paulo state
- Mouth: Atibaia River
  - coordinates: 23°7′S 46°29′W

The Cachoeira River is a river of São Paulo state in southeastern Brazil.

== See also ==
- List of rivers of São Paulo
