= Rio Comprido =

Rio Comprido can refer to:

- Rio Comprido (neighborhood), a neighborhood located in the northern zone of Rio de Janeiro city, Brazil
- Rio Comprido (river), a river located in São Paulo state
