= Paraibuna River =

Paraibuna is the name of two distinct tributaries of the Rio Paraiba do Sul in the South East of Brazil:

- Paraibuna River (Minas Gerais)
- Paraibuna River (Sao Paulo)
