= Boa Esperança do Sul =

- Municipality
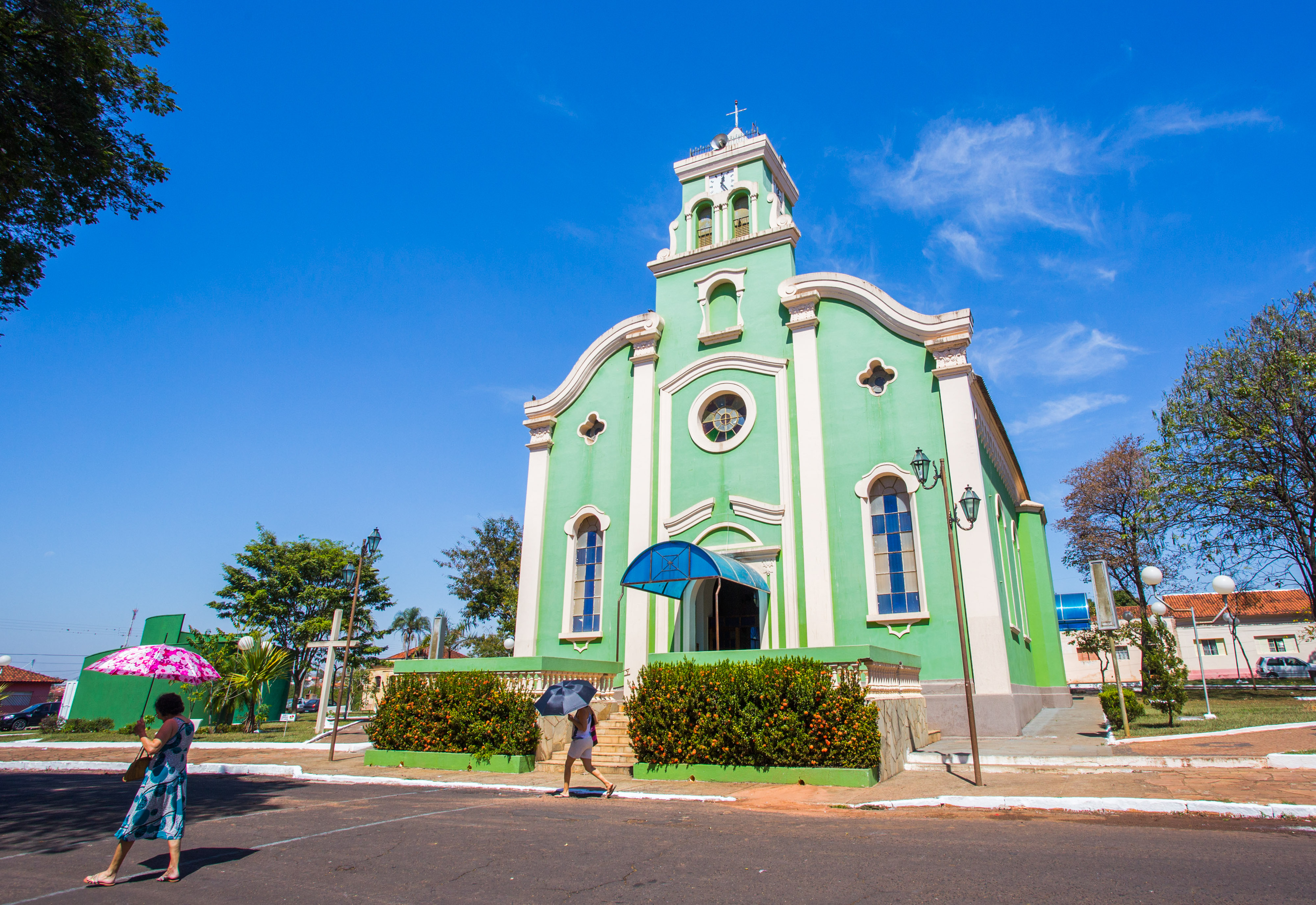

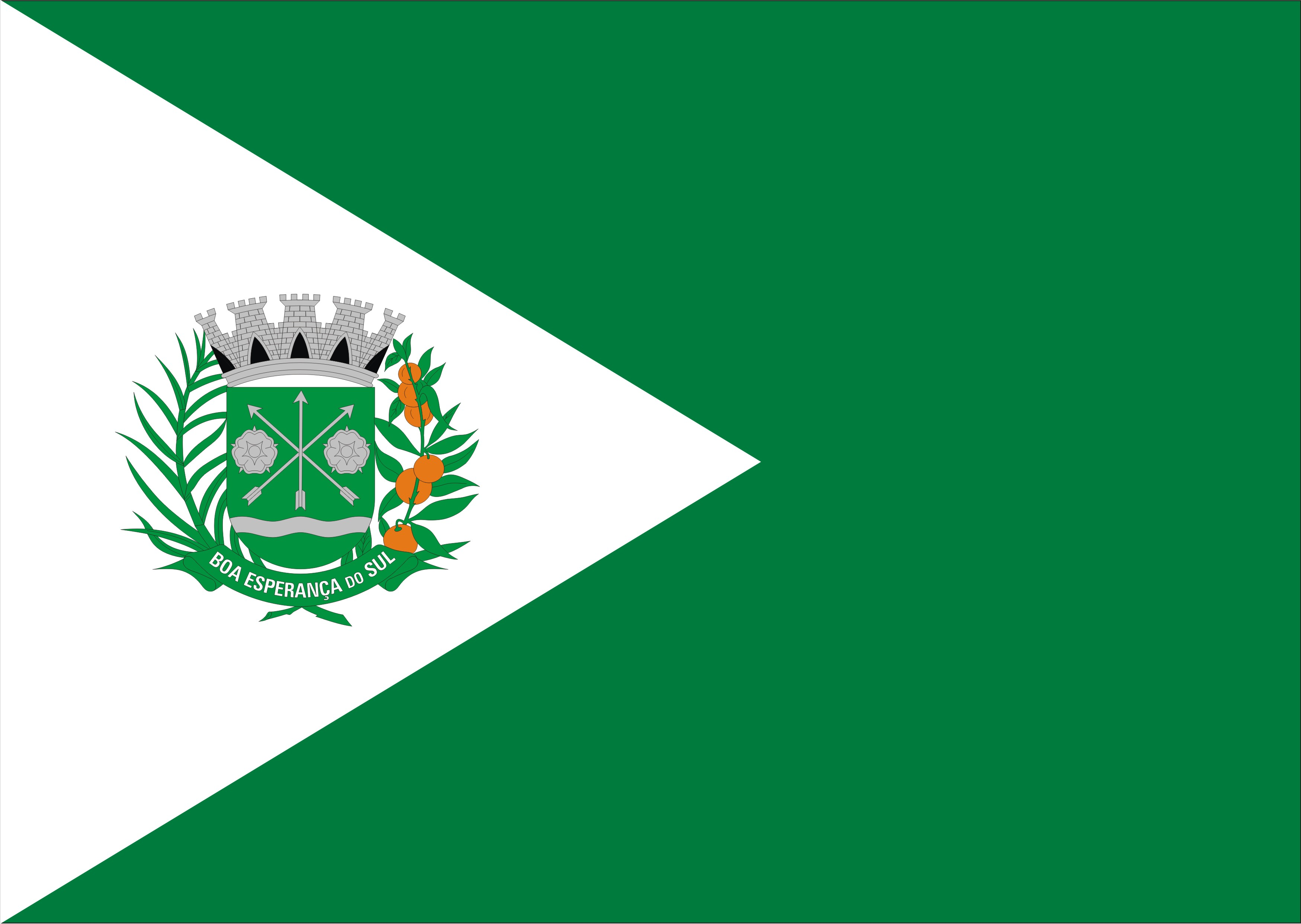
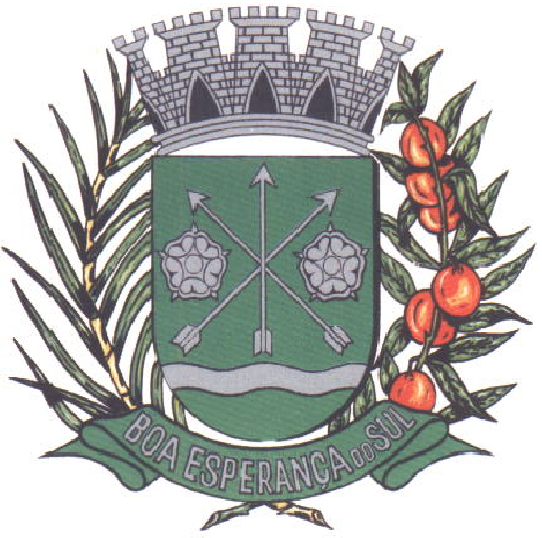
- Flag Coat of arms

- Location of Boa Esperança do Sul within the State of São Paulo

- Location of Boa Esperança do Sul within Brazil
- Coordinates: 21°59′33″S 48°23′27″W
- Country: Brazil
- State: São Paulo
- Mesoregion: Araraquara
- Microregion: Araraquara
- Established: July 21, 1898

Government
  - Mayor: Marcão Rosim (2013–2016) (PMDB)

Area
  - Total: 691.017 km^{2} (266.803 sq mi)
- Elevation: 490 m (1,610 ft)

Population (2020)
  - Total: 15,018
  - Density: 21.733/km^{2} (56.289/sq mi)
- Demonym: Boa-esperancense
- Time zone: UTC−3 (BRT)

Boa Esperança do Sul is a municipality in the Brazilian state of São Paulo. The population in 2020 was 15,018 and the area is 691.017 square kilometres (266.803 sq mi). The elevation is 490 metres (1,610 ft).

== History ==
Boa Esperança do Sul (English: Good Hope of the South) was known as São Sebastião de Boa Esperança (English: St. Sebastian of Good Hope) since the late 19th-century. In the late 1800s, the area now known as Boa Esperança do Sul was a vast expanse of farmland and forests. It was sparsely populated, with only a few scattered settlements. The region's fertile soil and abundant natural resources attracted pioneers from various parts of Brazil, many of whom were seeking to escape the poverty and hardship of their homelands.In 1880, a small settlement known as Capela de São Sebastião de Boa Esperança was established. The settlement grew rapidly as more people arrived, drawn by the promise of a prosperous future. In July 1895, it became a district, with the name of Boa Esperança. In 1944, it was renamed Boa Esperança do Sul.

== Geography ==
Boa Esperança do Sul is located in the southern-subtropical part of Brazil, at 21 degrees, 59 minutes, 33 second south, and 48 degrees, 23 minutes, 27 seconds west, at an altitude of 490 metres (1,610 ft), in the internal part of the State of São Paulo. It covers an area of 691.017 square kilometres (266.803 sq mi).

Rivers

- Boa Esperança River
- Jacaré Pepira River
- Jacaré-Guaçu River

== Demographics ==
Historical population (municipality)
Year	Population	%±
1920	12,702
1940	11,563	−9.0%
1950	8,226	−28.9%
1960	6,977	−15.2%
1970	6,363	−8.8%
1980	8,352	31.3%
1991	11,867	42.1%
2000	12,573	5.9%
2010	13,645	8.5%
2022	12,978	−4.9%

Total population: 13,750 (2011 Census)

- Urban: 10,753
- Rural: 1,820
- Men: 6,391
- Women: 6,182
- Density (inhabitants/km^{2}): 18.81
- Infant mortality up to 1 year old (per thousand): 17.78
- Life expectancy (years): 70.23
- Fertility rate (children per woman): 2.79
- Literacy rate: 85.65%
- Human Development Index (HDI): 0.755
  - Income: 0.688
  - Longevity: 0.754
  - Education: 0,822

== Government ==
- Mayor: Marcão Rosim (2013–2016)

== Economy ==
Its economy is based on agriculture, especially coffee, cotton, sugarcane, maize, soya beans plantations, agribusiness, dairy, and beef cattle.

== Transport ==
- SP-255 Highway

== Media ==
In telecommunications, the city was served by Telecomunicações de São Paulo. In July 1998, this company was acquired by Telefónica, which adopted the Vivo brand in 2012. The company is currently an operator of cell phones, fixed lines, internet (fiber optics/4G) and television (satellite and cable).

== See also ==
- List of municipalities in São Paulo
- Interior of São Paulo
