= Bauru River =

Location
- Country: Brazil

Physical characteristics
- Source
  - location: São Paulo state
- Mouth: Ribeirão Grande
  - coordinates: 22°16′S 48°50′W

The Bauru River is a river of São Paulo state in southeastern Brazil.

== See also ==
- List of rivers of São Paulo
