= Jacuí River (São Paulo) =

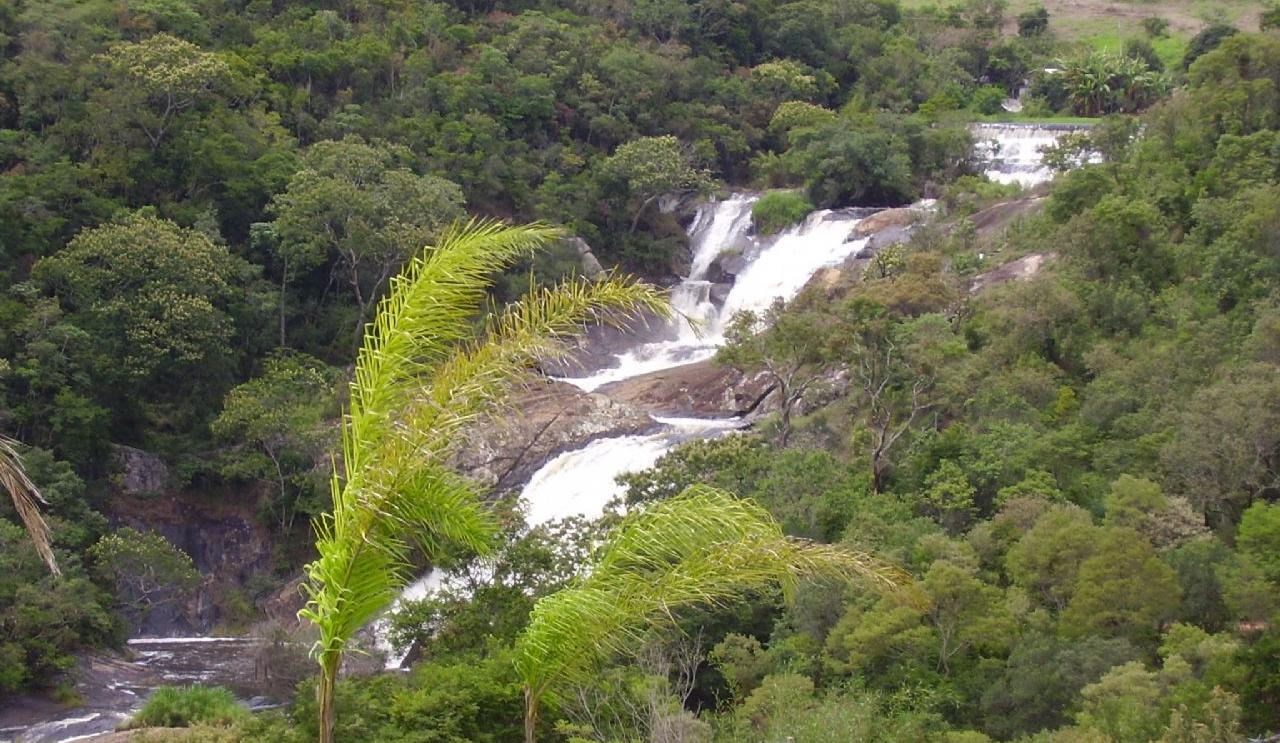

Location
- Country: Brazil

Physical characteristics
- Source
  - location: São Paulo state
- Mouth: Paraitinga River
  - coordinates: 23°5′S 45°8′W

The Jacuí River is a river of São Paulo state in southeastern Brazil.

== See also ==
- List of rivers of São Paulo
