= Cubatão River =

Cubatão River may refer to several rivers in Brazil:

- Cubatão River (Paraná)
- Cubatão River (São Paulo)
- Cubatão River (north Santa Catarina)
- Cubatão River (south Santa Catarina)
