= Pinhal Grande River =

Location
- Country: Brazil

Physical characteristics
- Source
  - location: São Paulo state
- Mouth: Itapetininga River
  - coordinates: 23°45′S 47°50′W

The Pinhal Grande River is a river of São Paulo state in southeastern Brazil.

== See also ==
- List of rivers of São Paulo
