= Claro River (Pardo River tributary) =

Location
- Country: Brazil

Physical characteristics
- Source
  - location: São Paulo state
- Mouth: Pardo River
  - coordinates: 22°50′S 49°9′W

The Claro River is a river of São Paulo state in southeastern Brazil. It is a tributary of the Pardo River.

== See also ==
- List of rivers of São Paulo
