= Embumirim River =

Embu-Mirim River
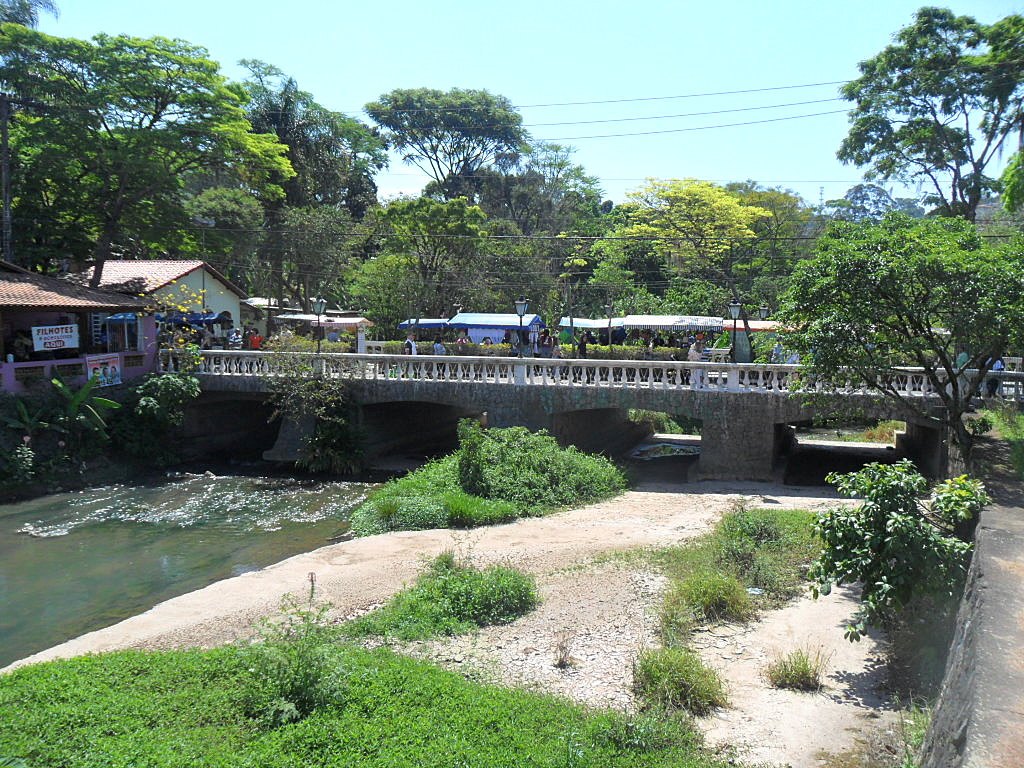

Location
- Country: Brazil

Physical characteristics
- Source
  - location: São Paulo state
- Mouth: Guarapiranga River
  - coordinates: 23°43′S 46°45′W

The Embu-Mirim River is a river of São Paulo state in southeastern Brazil.

== See also ==
- List of rivers of São Paulo
