= Jataí River =

Location
- Country: Brazil

Physical characteristics
- Source
  - location: São Paulo state
- Mouth: Preto River
  - coordinates: 20°30′S 49°30′W

The Jataí River is a river in the São Paulo state in southeastern Brazil.

== See also ==
- List of rivers of São Paulo
