= Batalha River =

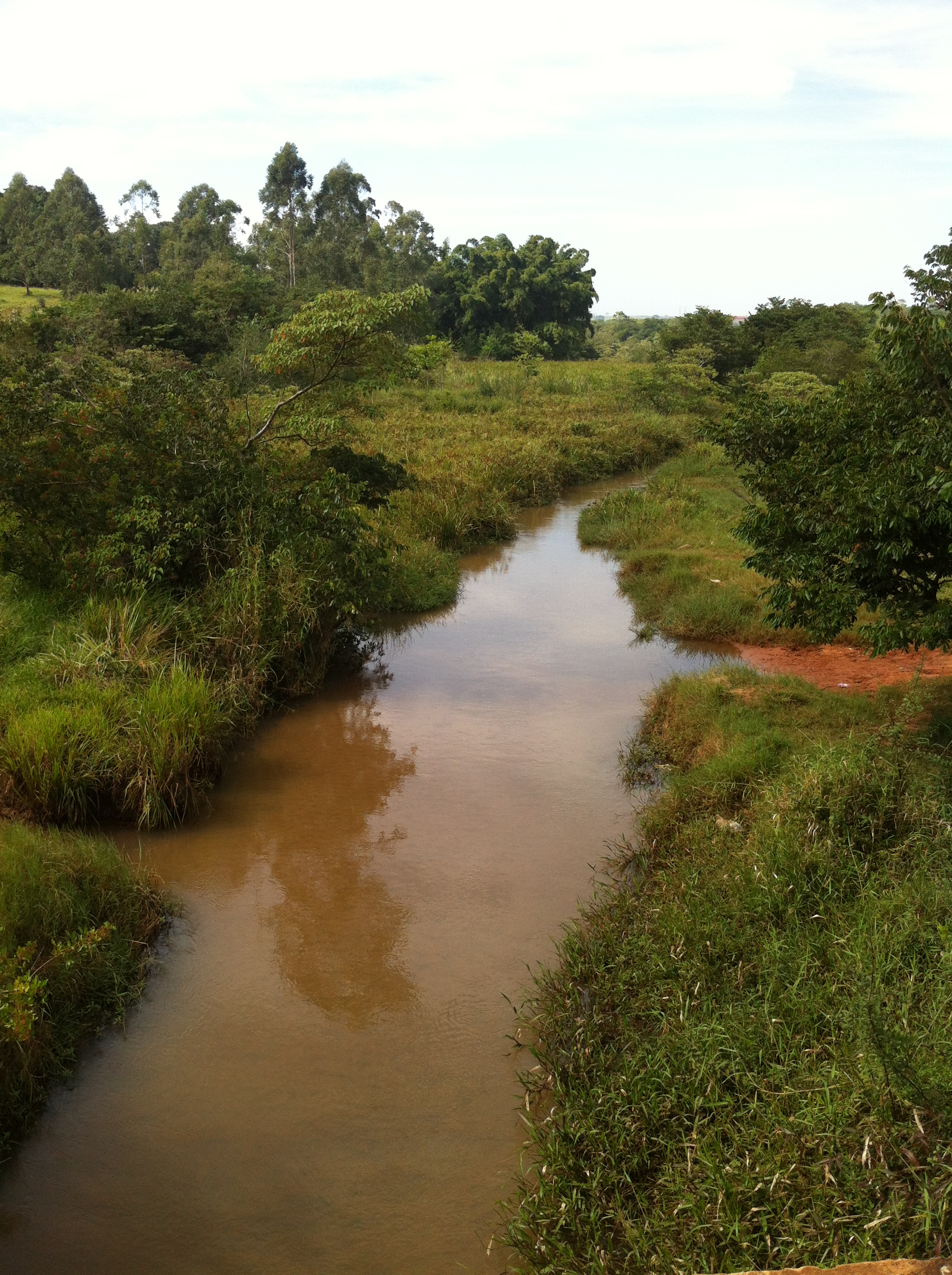
- The river near Bauru

Location
- Country: Brazil

Physical characteristics
- Source
  - location: São Paulo state
- Mouth
  - location: Tietê River near Uru
  - coordinates: 21°41′24.29″S 49°12′15.44″W
- Length: 167 km (104 mi)

The Batalha River is a 167 km long river of São Paulo state in southeastern Brazil. It is a left hand tributary of Tietê River.

== See also ==
- List of rivers of São Paulo
