= Do Peixe River (Paraibuna River, São Paulo) =

Location
- Country: Brazil

Physical characteristics
- Source
  - location: São Paulo state
- Mouth: Paraibuna River
  - coordinates: 23°24′S 45°28′W

The Do Peixe River is a river of São Paulo state in southeastern Brazil. It is a tributary of the Paraibuna River.

== See also ==
- List of rivers of São Paulo
