= Capivari River (Capivara (Paranapanema) River tributary) =

Capivari River

Location
- Country: Brazil

Physical characteristics
- Source
  - location: São Paulo state
- Mouth: Represa Capivara
  - coordinates: 22°35′S 50°54′W

The Capivari River is a river of São Paulo state in southeastern Brazil. It flows into the Represa Capivara, which drains by the (different) Capivara River into the Paranapanema.

== See also ==
- List of rivers of São Paulo
