= Cachoeirinha River =

Location
- Country: Brazil

Physical characteristics
- Source
  - location: São Paulo state
- Mouth: Turvo River
  - coordinates: 20°36′S 49°8′W

The Cachoeirinha River is a river in the São Paulo state in southeastern Brazil.

== See also ==
- List of rivers of São Paulo
