= Paraibuna (disambiguation) =

Paraibuna is a municipality in the state of São Paulo, Brazil.

Paraibuna may also refer to:

- Paraibuna River (São Paulo), a tributary of the Paraiba do Sul in the state of São Paulo, Brazil
- Paraibuna River (Minas Gerais), another tributary of the Paraiba do Sul in the state of Minas Gerais, Brazil
