= Guaxupé River =

Location
- Country: Brazil

Physical characteristics
- Source
  - location: Minas Gerais state
- Mouth: Pardo River
  - location: São Paulo state
  - coordinates: 21°33′S 46°47′W

The Guaxupé River is a river of Minas Gerais and São Paulo states in southeastern Brazil.

== See also ==
- List of rivers of Minas Gerais
