= Branco River (São Paulo) =

Location
- Country: Brazil

Physical characteristics
- Source
  - location: São Paulo state
- Mouth: Atlantic Ocean
  - coordinates: 24°9′S 46°48′W

The Branco River is a river of São Paulo state in southeastern Brazil.

== See also ==
- List of rivers of São Paulo
