= Ribeirão Barra Mansa =

Location
- Country: Brazil

Physical characteristics
- Source
  - location: São Paulo state
- Mouth: Tietê River
  - coordinates: 21°21′S 49°37′W

The Ribeirão Barra Mansa is a river of São Paulo state in southeastern Brazil.

== See also ==
- List of rivers of São Paulo
