= Buquira River =

- Location within Brazil
- Native name: Rio Buquira (Portuguese)

Location
- Country: Brazil

Physical characteristics
- Source
  - location: São Paulo state
- Mouth
  - location: São José dos Campos
  - coordinates: 23.153398°S 45.896737°W

Basin features
- River system: Paraíba do Sul

The Buquira River (Portuguese: Rio Buquira) is a river of São Paulo state in southeastern Brazil. It is a tributary of the Paraíba do Sul.

The headwaters are protected by the 292,000 hectares (720,000 acres) Mananciais do Rio Paraíba do Sul Environmental Protection Area, created in 1982 to protect the sources of the Paraíba do Sul river.

== See also ==
- List of rivers of São Paulo
