= Cotia River =

Location
- Country: Brazil

Physical characteristics
- Source
  - location: São Paulo state
- Mouth: Tietê River
  - coordinates: 23°31′S 46°51′W
- Basin size: 262

The Cotia River is a river of São Paulo state in southeastern Brazil.

== See also ==
- List of rivers of São Paulo
