= Do Peixe River (Tietê River tributary) =

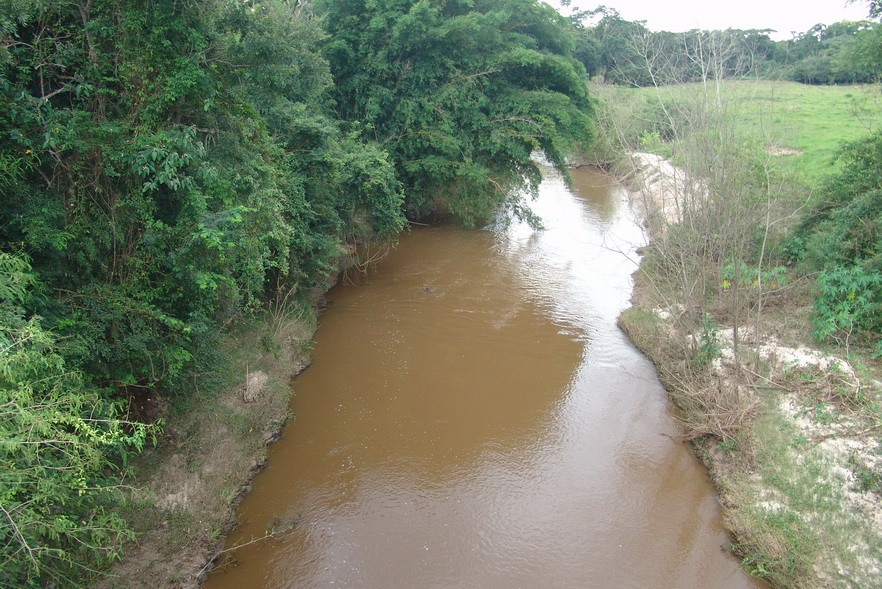

Location
- Country: Brazil

Physical characteristics
- Source
  - location: São Paulo state
- Mouth: Tietê River
  - coordinates: 22°49′S 48°5′W

The Do Peixe River is a river of São Paulo state in southeastern Brazil. It is a tributary of the Tietê River.

== See also ==
- List of rivers of São Paulo
