= Moji-Mirim River =

Location
- Country: Brazil

Physical characteristics
- Source
  - location: São Paulo state
- Mouth: Moji-Guaçu River
  - coordinates: 22°22′S 47°0′W

The Moji-Mirim River is a river of São Paulo state in southeastern Brazil.

== See also ==
- List of rivers of São Paulo
