= Jundiaí River (upper Tietê River tributary) =

Coordinates: 23°32′10″S 46°15′13″W

Location
- Country: Brazil

Physical characteristics
- Source
  - location: São Paulo state
- Mouth
  - location: Tietê River

The Jundiaí River (Portuguese, Rio Jundiaí) is a river of São Paulo state in southeastern Brazil. It is a tributary of the Tietê River, which it joins in Mogi das Cruzes.

== See also ==
- List of rivers of São Paulo
- Tributaries of the Río de la Plata
