= São José dos Dourados River =

Coordinates: 20°22′22″S 51°19′22″W

Location
- Country: Brazil

Physical characteristics
- Source
  - location: São Paulo state
- Mouth
  - location: Paraná River

The São José dos Dourados River (Portuguese, Rio São José dos Dourados) is a river of São Paulo state in southeastern Brazil. It is a tributary of the Paraná River, which it joins just upriver of Ilha Solteira Dam.

== See also ==
- List of rivers of São Paulo
- Tributaries of the Río de la Plata
