= Novo River (Paranapanema River tributary) =

Location
- Country: Brazil

Physical characteristics
- Source
  - location: São Paulo state
- Mouth: Paranapanema River
  - coordinates: 22°54′S 49°59′W

The Novo River is a river of São Paulo state in southeastern Brazil. It is a tributary of the Paranapanema River.

== See also ==
- List of rivers of São Paulo
