= Da Água Morta River =

River in Brazil

Location
- Country: Brazil

Physical characteristics
- Source
  - location: Serra do Itapirapuã
- Mouth: Itararé River
  - coordinates: 24°18′S 49°16′W

The Da Água Morta River is a river on the border between São Paulo and Paraná states in southern Brazil. Arising in the Serra do Itapirapuã, it flows into the Itararé River.

== See also ==
- List of rivers of Paraná
- List of rivers of São Paulo
