= Jacupiranga River =

River in Brazil

Coordinates: 24°37′16″S 47°43′48″W

Location
- Country: Brazil

Physical characteristics
- Source
  - location: São Paulo state

The Jacupiranga River is a river of São Paulo state in southeastern Brazil.

== See also ==
- List of rivers of São Paulo
