= Jundiuvira River =

Location
- Country: Brazil

Physical characteristics
- Source
  - location: São Paulo state
- Mouth: Tietê River
  - coordinates: 23°21′S 47°2′W

The Jundiuvira River is a river in São Paulo state in southeastern Brazil.

== See also ==
- List of rivers of São Paulo
