= Itinguçu River =

Location
- Country: Brazil

Physical characteristics
- Source
  - location: São Paulo state
- Mouth: Una da Aldeia River
  - coordinates: 24°29′S 47°29′W

The Itinguçu River is a river of São Paulo state in southeastern Brazil.

== See also ==
- List of rivers of São Paulo
