= Brandãozinho (footballer, born 1930) =

Brazilian footballer (1930–2021)

Personal information
- Full name: José Carlos Silveira Braga
- Date of birth: 24 January 1930
- Place of birth: Boa Esperança do Sul, São Paulo, Brazil
- Date of death: 5 January 2021 (aged 90)
- Place of death: Araraquara, São Paulo, Brazil
- Position: Forward

Youth career
- Paulista de São Carlos
- 1945–1950: Jabaquara

Senior career*
Years	Team	Apps	(Gls)
1950–1952	Palmeiras	29	(11)
1952	Santos		
1952–1953	Monaco		
1953–1957	Nice		
1957–1959	Celta Vigo	42	(9)
1959–1960	Espanyol	9	(1)
1960–1961	Real Oviedo	9	(0)
1961–1962	Celta Vigo	11	(2)
Total		100+	(23+)
- * Club domestic league appearances and goals

José Carlos Silveira Braga, known as Brandãozinho (24 January 1930 – 5 January 2021) was a Brazilian professional footballer who played as a forward for clubs in Brazil, France, and Spain.

== Career ==
Born in Boa Esperança do Sul, Brandãozinho played for Paulista de São Carlos, Jabaquara, Palmeiras (with whom he won the Torneio Rio – São Paulo in 1951), Santos, Monaco, Nice, Celta Vigo, Espanyol and Real Oviedo.

Brandãozinho died in Araraquara on 5 January 2021, aged 90.
