= Itapirapuã River =

River in Brazil

Location
- Country: Brazil

Physical characteristics
- Source
  - location: Paraná state
- Mouth: Ribeira de Iguape River
  - coordinates: 24°42′S 49°12′W

The Itapirapuã River is a river on the boundary between the Paraná and São Paulo states in southeastern Brazil.

The Rio Itapirapuã is part of the watershed of the Rio Ribeira de Iguape, and is a tributary of the Rio Ribeira de Iguape.

== See also ==
- List of rivers of Paraná
- List of rivers of São Paulo
