= Taquaruçu River (São Paulo) =

River in São Paulo, Brazil

Location
- Country: Brazil

Physical characteristics
- Source
  - location: São Paulo state
- Mouth: Paranapanema River
  - coordinates: 22°37′S 51°49′W

The Taquaruçu River is a river of São Paulo state in southeastern Brazil.

== See also ==
- List of rivers of São Paulo
