= Ibitinga =

- Municipality
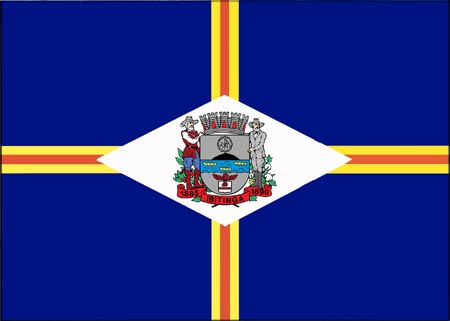
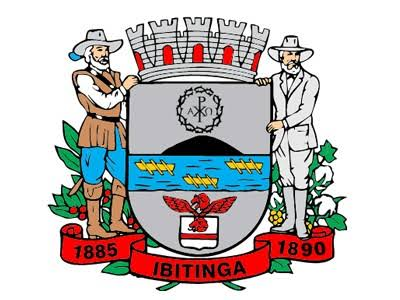
- Flag Coat of arms

- Location in São Paulo state

- Location in Brazil
- Coordinates: 21°45′28″S 48°49′44″W
- Country: Brazil
- Region: Southeast
- State: São Paulo

Area
  - Total: 689 km^{2} (266 sq mi)

Population (2020)
  - Total: 60,600
  - Density: 88.0/km^{2} (228/sq mi)
- Time zone: UTC−3 (BRT)
- Website: www.ibitinga.sp.gov.br

Ibitinga is a municipality in the state of São Paulo in Brazil. The population is 60,600 (2020 est.) in an area of 689 km^{2} (266 mi^{2}). The elevation is 491 m (1,611 ft). The name comes from the Tupi language, meaning "White Lands". The main rivers near Ibitinga are the Tietê River and its tributaries Jacaré-Pepira River and Jacaré-Guaçu River.

The town is commonly referred to as the "Embroidery National Capital", for its large embroidery industry, which started in the 1960s with immigrants from Madeira Island, and really developed after 1974, when the City Hall promoted the first "Embroidery Fair", at the City Stadium. Year after year, the town has passed from being dependent on agriculture and cattle to its current situation, where the economy mostly depends on embroidery and tourism.

At the Tietê river in Ibitinga, it is also located a dam (the Ibitinga Hydroelectric Power Station) and one lock. This lock, together with many others at other Tietê dams, allows the navigation of Tietê river along most of its length.

== Media ==
In telecommunications, the city was served by Companhia Telefônica Brasileira until 1973, when it began to be served by Telecomunicações de São Paulo. In July 1998, this company was acquired by Telefónica, which adopted the Vivo brand in 2012.

The company is currently an operator of cell phones, fixed lines, internet (fiber optics/4G) and television (satellite and cable).

== See also ==
- List of municipalities in São Paulo
- Interior of São Paulo
