= Santo Anastácio River =

Coordinates: 21°50′11″S 52°10′32″W

Location
- Country: Brazil

Physical characteristics
- Source
  - location: São Paulo state

The Santo Anastácio River is a river of São Paulo state in southeastern Brazil.

== See also ==
- List of rivers of São Paulo
