= Preto River (São Paulo) =

Location
- Country: Brazil

Physical characteristics
- Source
  - location: São Paulo state
- Mouth: Turvo River
  - coordinates: 20°10′S 49°39′W

The Preto River is a river of São Paulo state in southeastern Brazil.

== See also ==
- List of rivers of São Paulo
