= Capivari River (Tietê River tributary) =

Coordinates: 22°59′3″S 47°45′51″W

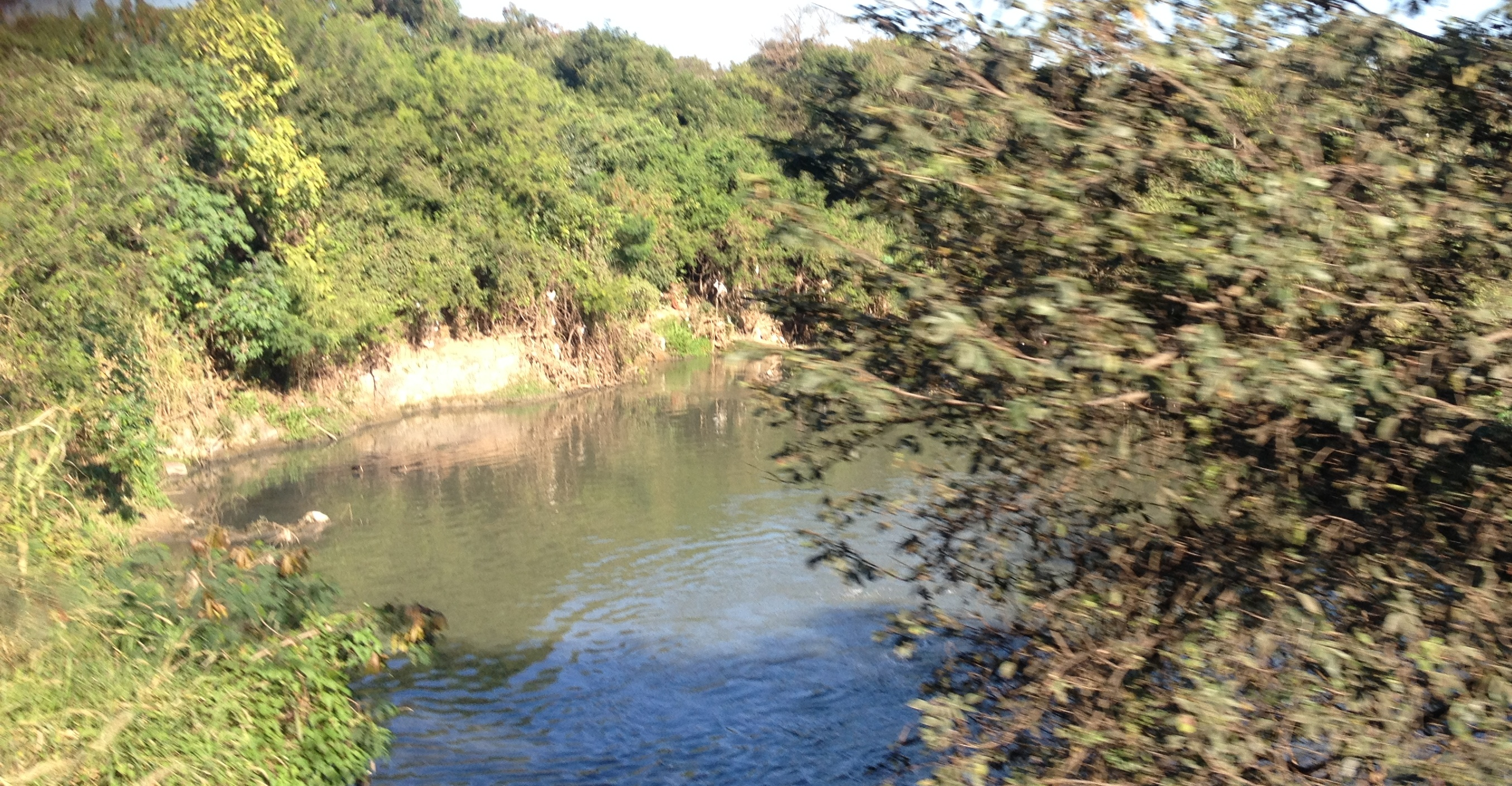

Location
- Country: Brazil

Physical characteristics
- Source
  - location: São Paulo state
- Mouth
  - location: Tietê River

The Capivari River (Portuguese, Rio Capivari) is a river of São Paulo state in southeastern Brazil. It is a tributary of the Tietê River.

== See also ==
- List of rivers of São Paulo
- Tributaries of the Río de la Plata
