= Turvo River (Itapetininga River tributary) =

Location
- Country: Brazil

Physical characteristics
- Source
  - location: São Paulo state
- Mouth: Itapetininga River
  - coordinates: 23°45′S 47°50′W

The Turvo River is a river of São Paulo state in southeastern Brazil. It is a tributary of the Itapetininga River.

== See also ==
- List of rivers of São Paulo
