= Paulo Diniz River =

Location
- Country: Brazil

Physical characteristics
- Source
  - location: São Paulo state
- Mouth: Rio Grande
  - coordinates: 19°53′S 50°11′W

The Paulo Diniz River is a river of São Paulo state in southeastern Brazil.

== See also ==
- List of rivers of São Paulo
