= Alambari River (Turvo River tributary) =

Location
- Country: Brazil

Physical characteristics
- Source
  - location: São Paulo state
- Mouth: Turvo River
  - coordinates: 22°43′S 49°36′W

The Alambari River is a river of São Paulo state in southeastern Brazil. It is a tributary of the Turvo River.

== See also ==
- List of rivers of São Paulo
