= Rio Pequeno (São Paulo) =

Location
- Country: Brazil

Physical characteristics
- Source
  - location: São Paulo state
- Mouth
  - location: Pinheiros River

Rio Pequeno (Portuguese for "little river") is a river of São Paulo state in southeastern Brazil.

== See also ==
- List of rivers of São Paulo
