= Pirapozinho River =

Coordinates: 22°32′14″S 52°01′54″W

Location
- Country: Brazil

Physical characteristics
- Source
  - location: São Paulo state

The Pirapozinho River is a river of São Paulo state in southeastern Brazil.

== See also ==
- List of rivers of São Paulo
