= Puruba River =

Location
- Country: Brazil

Physical characteristics
- Source
  - location: São Paulo state
- Mouth: Atlantic Ocean
  - coordinates: 23°21′S 44°57′W

The Puruba River is a river of São Paulo state in southeastern Brazil.

== See also ==
- List of rivers of São Paulo
