= Chibarro River =

Coordinates: 21°52′S 48°16′W

Location
- Country: Brazil

Physical characteristics
- Source
  - location: São Paulo state

The Chibarro River is a river of São Paulo state in southeastern Brazil.

== See also ==
- List of rivers of São Paulo
