= Tatuí River =

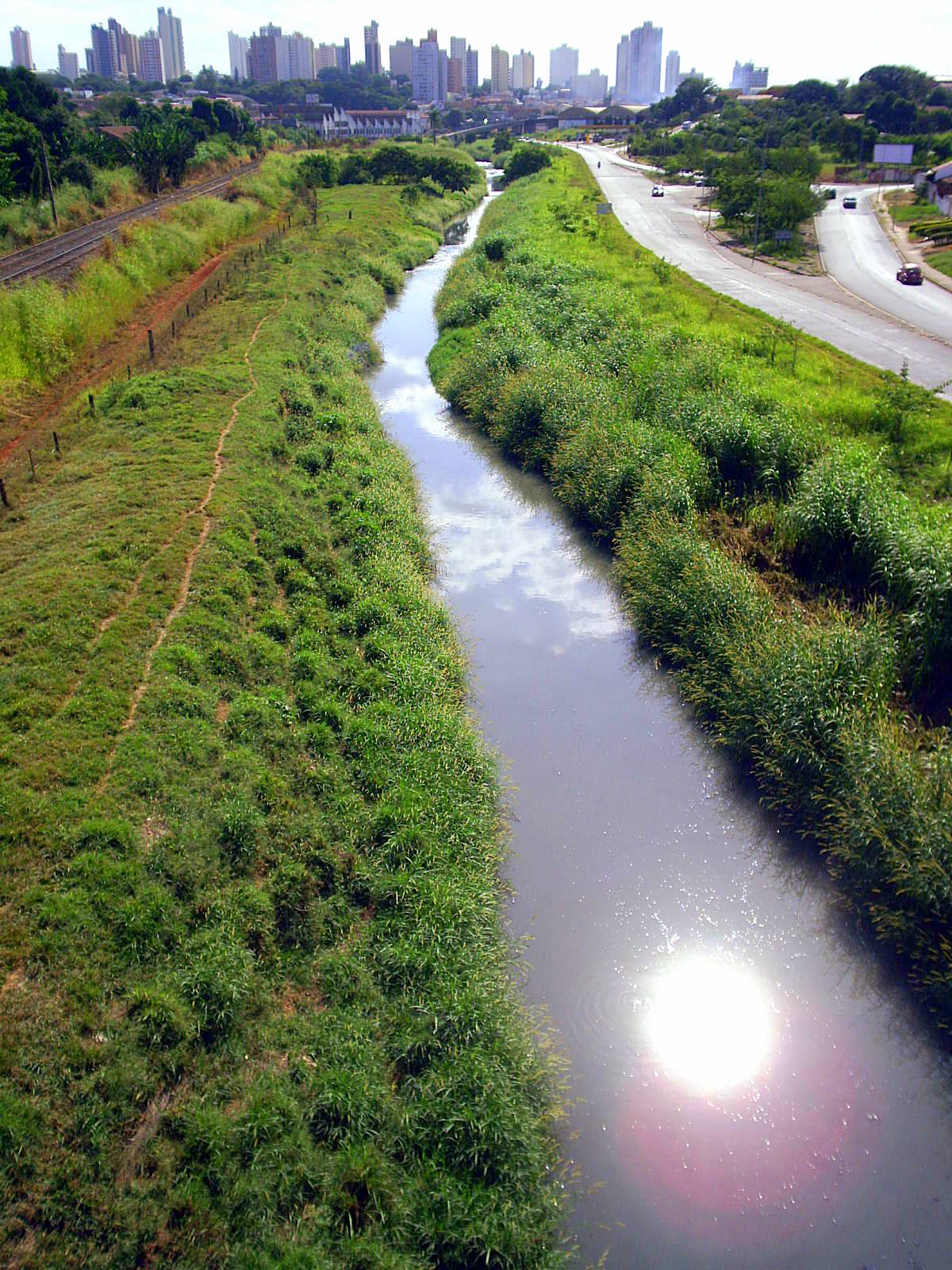

Location
- Country: Brazil

Physical characteristics
- Source
  - location: São Paulo state
- Mouth: Sorocaba River
  - coordinates: 23°19′S 47°47′W

The Tatuí River is a river of São Paulo state in southeastern Brazil.

== See also ==
- List of rivers of São Paulo
