= Quilombo River (Juquiá River tributary) =

Location
- Country: Brazil

Physical characteristics
- Source
  - location: São Paulo state
- Mouth: Juquiá River
  - coordinates: 24°22′S 47°50′W

The Quilombo River is a river of São Paulo state in southeastern Brazil. It is a tributary of the Juquiá River.

== See also ==
- List of rivers of São Paulo
