= Pilões River (São Paulo) =

Location
- Country: Brazil

Physical characteristics
- Source
  - location: São Paulo state
- Mouth: Jaguari River
  - coordinates: 23°17′S 46°14′W

The Pilões River is a river of São Paulo state in southeastern Brazil.

== See also ==
- List of rivers of São Paulo
