= Das Pedras River (Una da Aldeia River tributary) =

Location
- Country: Brazil

Physical characteristics
- Source
  - location: São Paulo state
- Mouth: Una da Aldeia River
  - coordinates: 24°30′S 47°28′W

The Das Pedras River is a river of São Paulo state in southeastern Brazil. It is a tributary of the Una da Aldeia River.

== See also ==
- List of rivers of São Paulo
