= Paraitinga River (upper Tietê River tributary) =

Location
- Country: Brazil

Physical characteristics
- Source
  - location: São Paulo state
- Mouth: Tietê River
  - location: near Biritiba-Mirim
  - coordinates: 23°34′S 46°2′W

The Paraitinga River is a river of São Paulo state in southeastern Brazil. The Paraitinga is a tributary of the Tietê River, which it enters near Biritiba-Mirim.

== See also ==
- List of rivers of São Paulo
