= Tibiriça River =

Location
- Country: Brazil

Physical characteristics
- Source
  - location: São Paulo state
- Mouth: Aguapeí River
  - coordinates: 21°43′S 50°15′W

The Tibiriça River is a river of São Paulo state in southeastern Brazil.

== See also ==
- List of rivers of São Paulo
