= Itapeti River =

Location
- Country: Brazil

Physical characteristics
- Source
  - location: São Paulo state
- Mouth: Paraíba do Sul
  - coordinates: 23°23′S 46°3′W

The Itapeti River is a river of São Paulo state in southeastern Brazil.

== See also ==
- List of rivers of São Paulo
