= Guarapó River =

River in São Paulo, Brazil

Location
- Country: Brazil

Physical characteristics
- Source
  - location: São Paulo state
- Mouth: Sorocaba River
  - coordinates: 23°14′S 47°49′W

The Guarapó River is a river of São Paulo state in southeastern Brazil.

== See also ==
- List of rivers of São Paulo
