= Camburu River =

Coordinates: 23°41′S 45°28′W

Camburi River

Location
- Country: Brazil

Physical characteristics
- Source
  - location: São Paulo state

The Camburi River is a river of São Paulo state in southeastern Brazil.

== See also ==
- List of rivers of São Paulo
