= Biritibamirim River =

Biritiba-Mirim River

Location
- Country: Brazil

Physical characteristics
- Source
  - location: São Paulo state
- Mouth: Tietê River
  - coordinates: 23°33′S 46°6′W

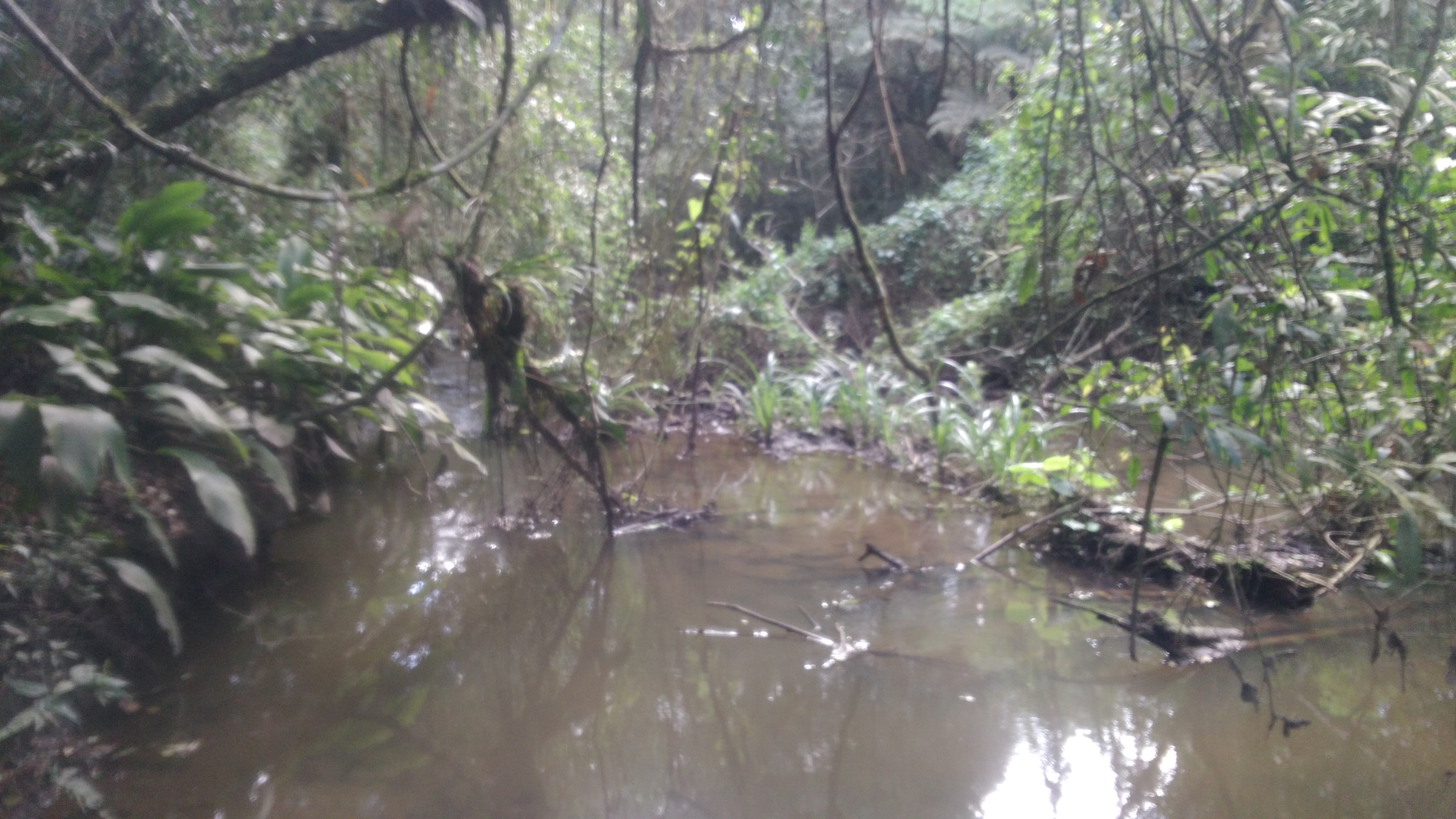

The Biritiba-Mirim River is a river of São Paulo state in southeastern Brazil.

== See also ==
- List of rivers of São Paulo
