= Jaú River (São Paulo) =

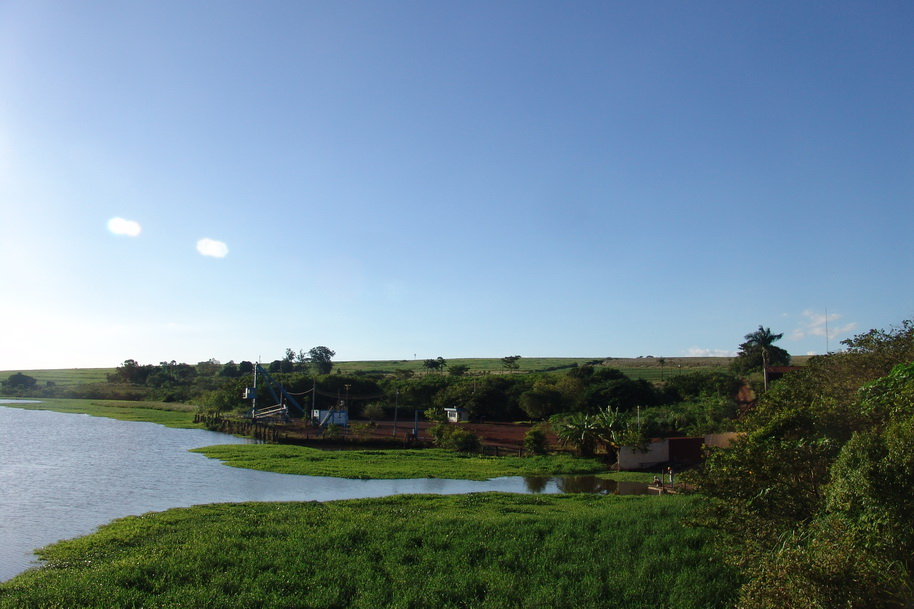
- The river on the border between Bariri and Itapuí

Location
- Country: Brazil

Physical characteristics
- Source
  - location: São Paulo state
- Mouth: Tietê River
  - coordinates: 22°10′S 48°43′W

The Jaú River is a river in the São Paulo state of southeastern Brazil.

== See also ==
- List of rivers of São Paulo
