= Pariquera-Açu River =

Location
- Country: Brazil

Physical characteristics
- Source
  - location: São Paulo state
- Mouth: Ribeira de Iguape River
  - coordinates: 24°38′S 47°44′W

The Pariquera-Açu River is a river of São Paulo state in southeastern Brazil.

== See also ==
- List of rivers of São Paulo
