= Jacaré-Pepira River =

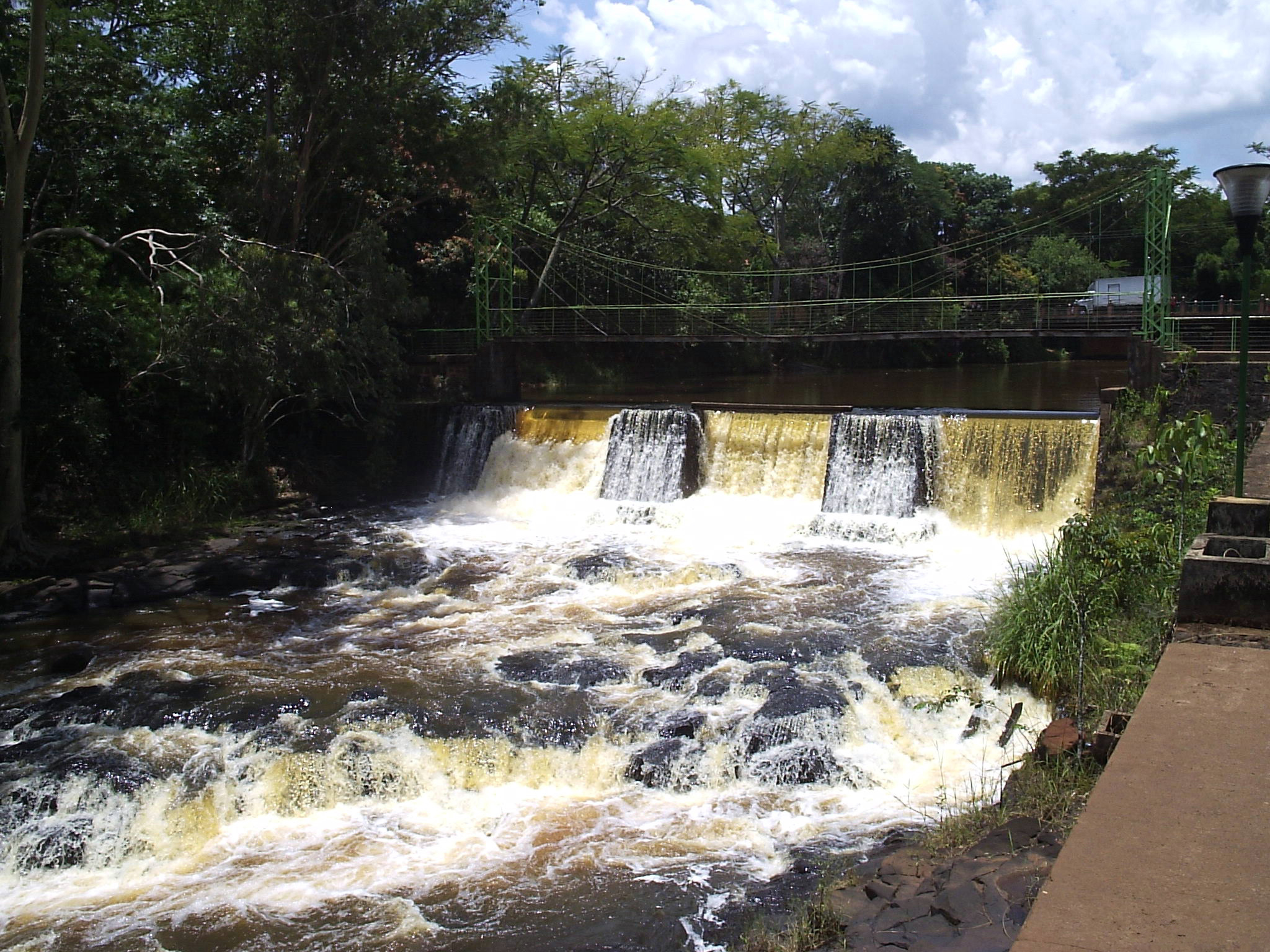
- Waterfall of the river near Brotas

Location
- Country: Brazil

Physical characteristics
- Source
  - location: São Paulo state
- Mouth
  - location: Tietê River
  - coordinates: 21°54′47″S 48°53′15″W
- Length: 174 km (108 mi)

The Jacaré-Pepira River is a river of São Paulo state in southeastern Brazil. It flows into the Tietê River near Ibitinga.

== See also ==
- List of rivers of São Paulo
