= Apiai-Mirim River =

Coordinates: 23°50′21″S 48°34′09″W

Location
- Country: Brazil

Physical characteristics
- Source
  - location: São Paulo state

The Apiai-Mirim River is a river of São Paulo state in southeastern Brazil.

== See also ==
- List of rivers of São Paulo
