= Sapucaí River (São Paulo) =

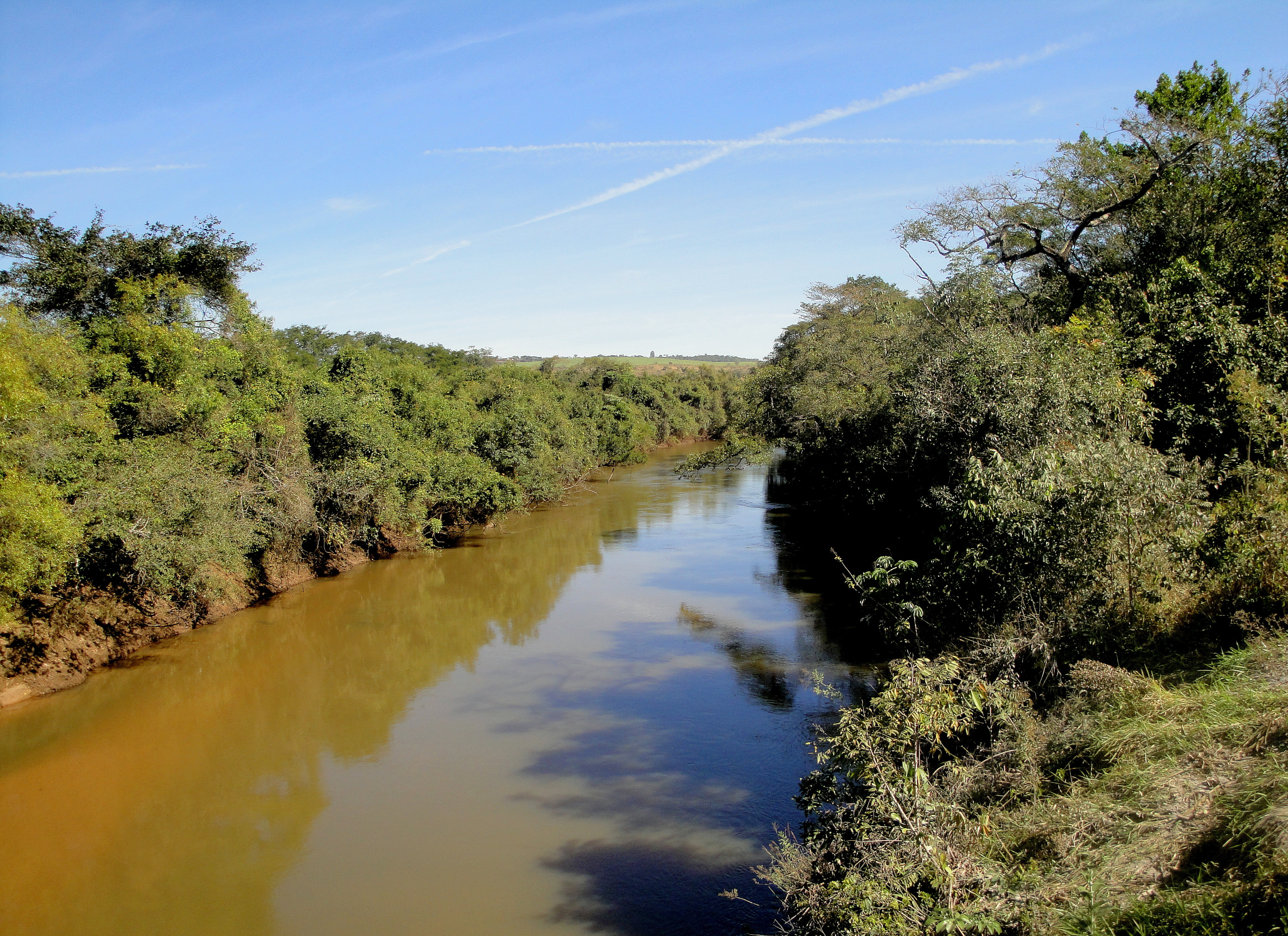

- Location within Brazil
- Native name: Rio Sapucaí (Portuguese)

Location
- Country: Brazil

Physical characteristics
- Source
  - location: São Paulo state
  - coordinates: 21.027654°S 47.188904°W
- Mouth
  - location: Rio Grande
  - coordinates: 20.130°S 48.449°W

The Sapucaí River is a river of São Paulo state in southeastern Brazil. It is a tributary of the Rio Grande.

== Course ==
The river forms to the north of Santo Antônio da Alegria, just north of the BR-265 highway near the border with Minas Gerais, where the Ribeirão do Pinheirinho meets the Ribeirão Tomba-perna. It then flows in a generally northwest direction. The river is dammed twice near São Joaquim da Barra. It continues northwest and enters the Rio Grande upstream from Colômbia, São Paulo.

== See also ==
- List of rivers of São Paulo
