= Boa Esperança River =

Location
- Country: Brazil

Physical characteristics
- Source
  - location: São Paulo state
- Mouth: Jacaré-Guaçu River
  - coordinates: 21°52′S 48°31′W

The Boa Esperança River is a river of São Paulo state in southeastern Brazil.

== See also ==
- List of rivers of São Paulo
