= Quilombo River (Moji-Guaçu River tributary) =

Location
- Country: Brazil

Physical characteristics
- Source
  - location: São Paulo state
- Mouth: Moji-Guaçu River
  - coordinates: 21°43′S 47°45′W

The Quilombo River is a river of São Paulo state in southeastern Brazil. The river flows through the cities of São Carlos e Descalvado. It is a tributary of the Moji-Guaçu River.

== See also ==
- List of rivers of São Paulo
