= Atibaia River =

Coordinates: 22.6933°S 47.2911°W

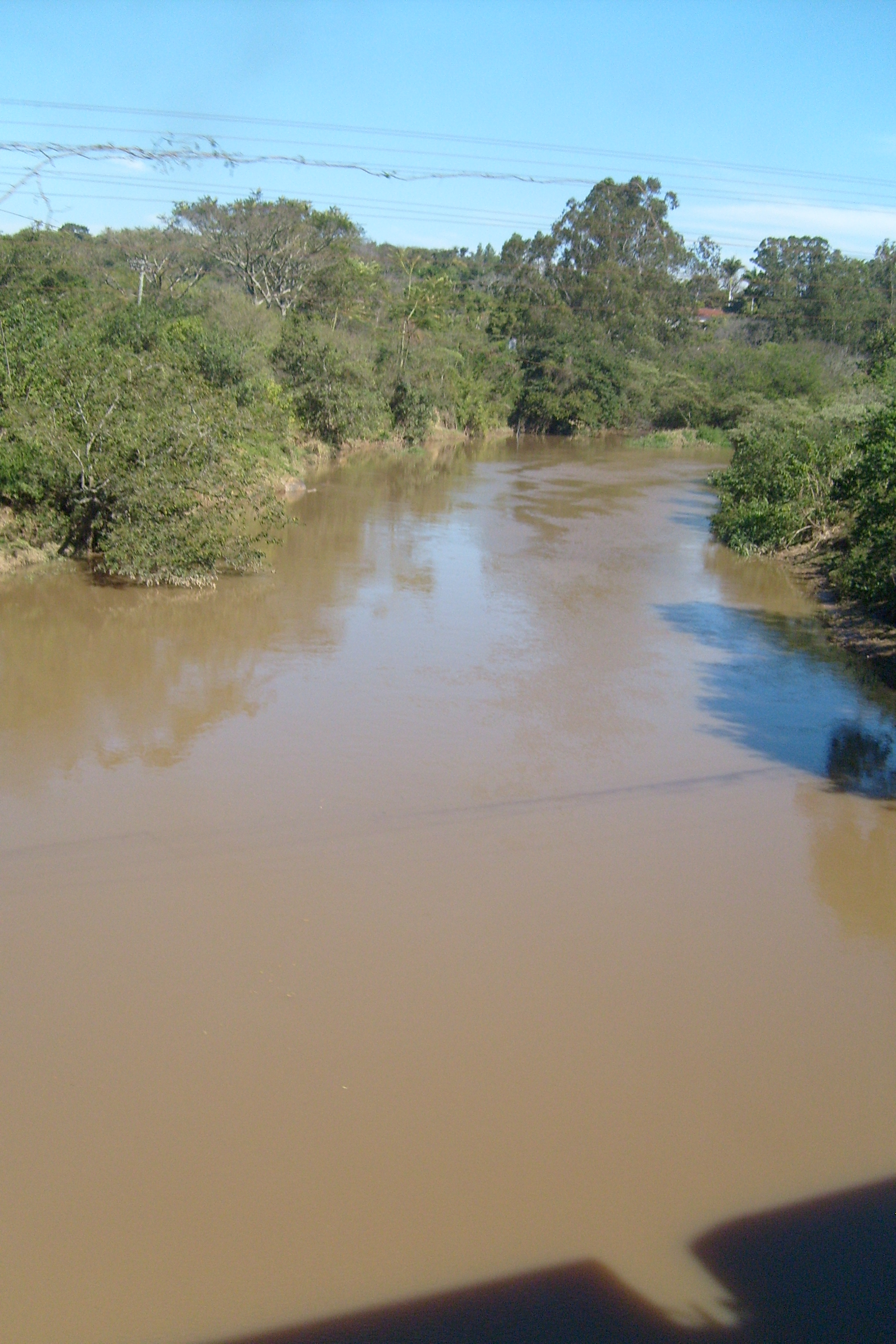
- Atibaia River at Campinas

Location
- Country: Brazil

Physical characteristics
- Source
  - location: São Paulo state

The Atibaia River is a river of São Paulo state in southeastern Brazil.

== See also ==
- List of rivers of São Paulo
