= Corumbataí River (São Paulo) =

Location
- Country: Brazil

Physical characteristics
- Source
  - location: São Paulo state
- Mouth: Piracicaba River
  - coordinates: 22°41′S 47°41′W

The Corumbataí River is a river of São Paulo state in southeastern Brazil.

== See also ==
- List of rivers of São Paulo
