= Turvo River (Pardo (Paranapanema) River tributary) =

Turvo River

Location
- Country: Brazil

Physical characteristics
- Source
  - location: São Paulo state
- Mouth: Pardo River
  - coordinates: 22°56′S 49°53′W

The Turvo River is a river of São Paulo state in southeastern Brazil. It joins the Pardo River shortly before that in turn joins the Paranapanema River near the city of Ourinhos.

== See also ==
- List of rivers of São Paulo
