= São Lourenço River (Tietê River tributary) =

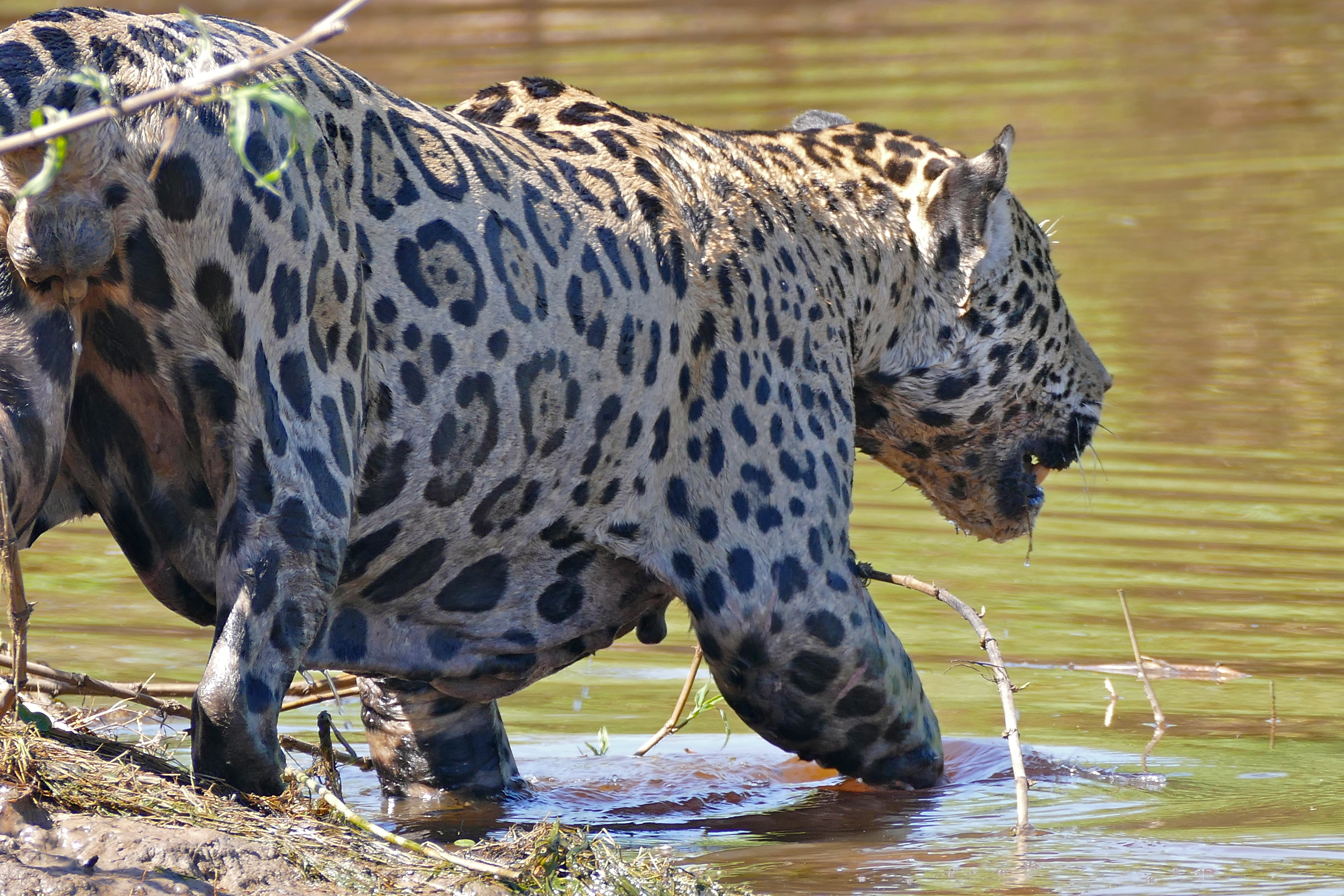
- A male jaguar drinking from the Tieté river.

Location
- Country: Brazil

Physical characteristics
- Source
  - location: São Paulo state
- Mouth: Tietê River
  - coordinates: 21°41′S 49°0′W

The São Lourenço River is a river of São Paulo state in southeastern Brazil. It is a tributary of the Tietê River.

== See also ==
- List of rivers of São Paulo
