= Comprido River (Paraíba do Sul) =

Location
- Country: Brazil

Physical characteristics
- Source
  - location: São Paulo state
- Mouth: Paraíba do Sul
  - coordinates: 23°14′S 45°58′W

The Comprido River is a river of São Paulo state in southeastern Brazil. Rising in the municipality of Jacareí, it follows the boundary with São José dos Campos and before discharging into the Paraíba do Sul.

== See also ==
- List of rivers of São Paulo
