= Alambari River (Tietê River tributary) =

Location
- Country: Brazil

Physical characteristics
- Source
  - location: São Paulo state
- Mouth: Tietê River
  - coordinates: 22°42′S 48°12′W

The Alambari River is a river of São Paulo state in southeastern Brazil. It is a tributary of the Tietê River.

== See also ==
- List of rivers of São Paulo
