= Juquiá River =

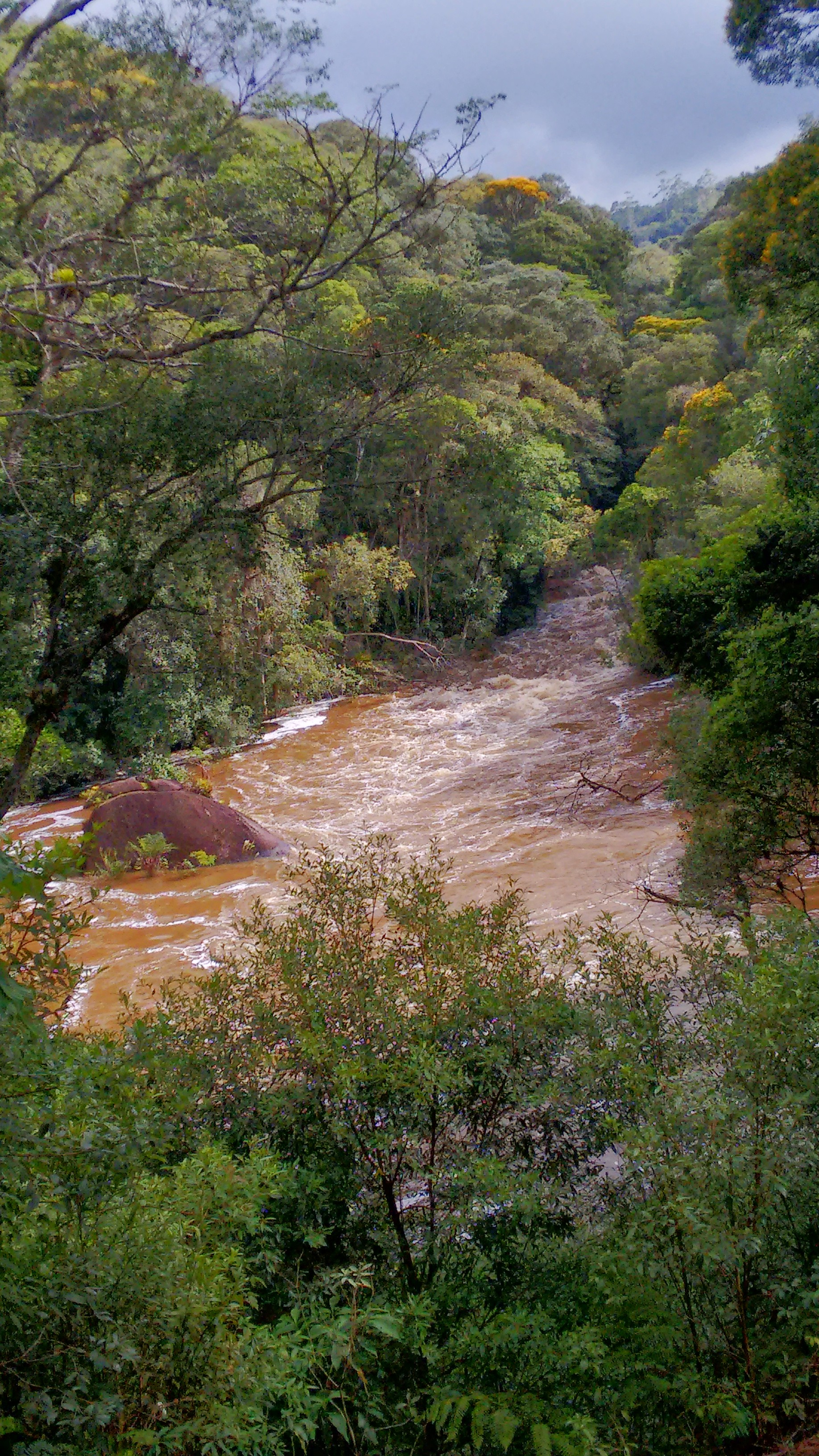

Location
- Country: Brazil

Physical characteristics
- Source
  - location: São Paulo state
- Mouth: Ribeira de Iguape River
  - coordinates: 24°24′S 47°50′W

The Juquiá River is a river of São Paulo state in southeastern Brazil.

== See also ==
- List of rivers of São Paulo
