= Paraitinga River =

- Location within Brazil
- Native name: Rio Paraitinga (Portuguese)

Location
- Country: Brazil

Physical characteristics
- Source
  - location: São Paulo state
- Mouth
  - location: Paraíba do Sul
  - coordinates: 23.368°S 45.665°W

The Paraitinga River is a river of São Paulo state in southeastern Brazil. It is a tributary of the Paraíba do Sul.

The headwaters are protected by the 292,000-hectare (720,000-acre) Mananciais do Rio Paraíba do Sul Environmental Protection Area, created in 1982 to protect the sources of the Paraíba do Sul river.

== See also ==
- List of rivers of São Paulo
