= Itapetininga River =

Coordinates: 23°36′1″S 48°26′33″W

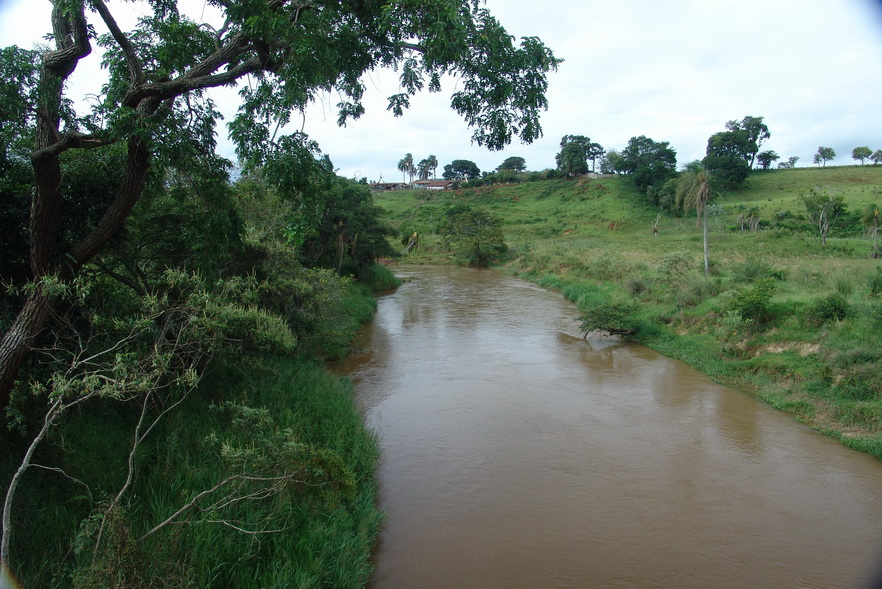

Location
- Country: Brazil

Physical characteristics
- Source
  - location: São Paulo state
- Mouth
  - location: Paranapanema River

The Itapetininga River (Portuguese, Rio Itapetininga, also known as Rio Itapetinga) is a river of São Paulo state in southeastern Brazil. It is a tributary of the Paranapanema River.

== See also ==
- List of rivers of São Paulo
- List of tributaries of the Río de la Plata
