= Cubatão River (São Paulo) =

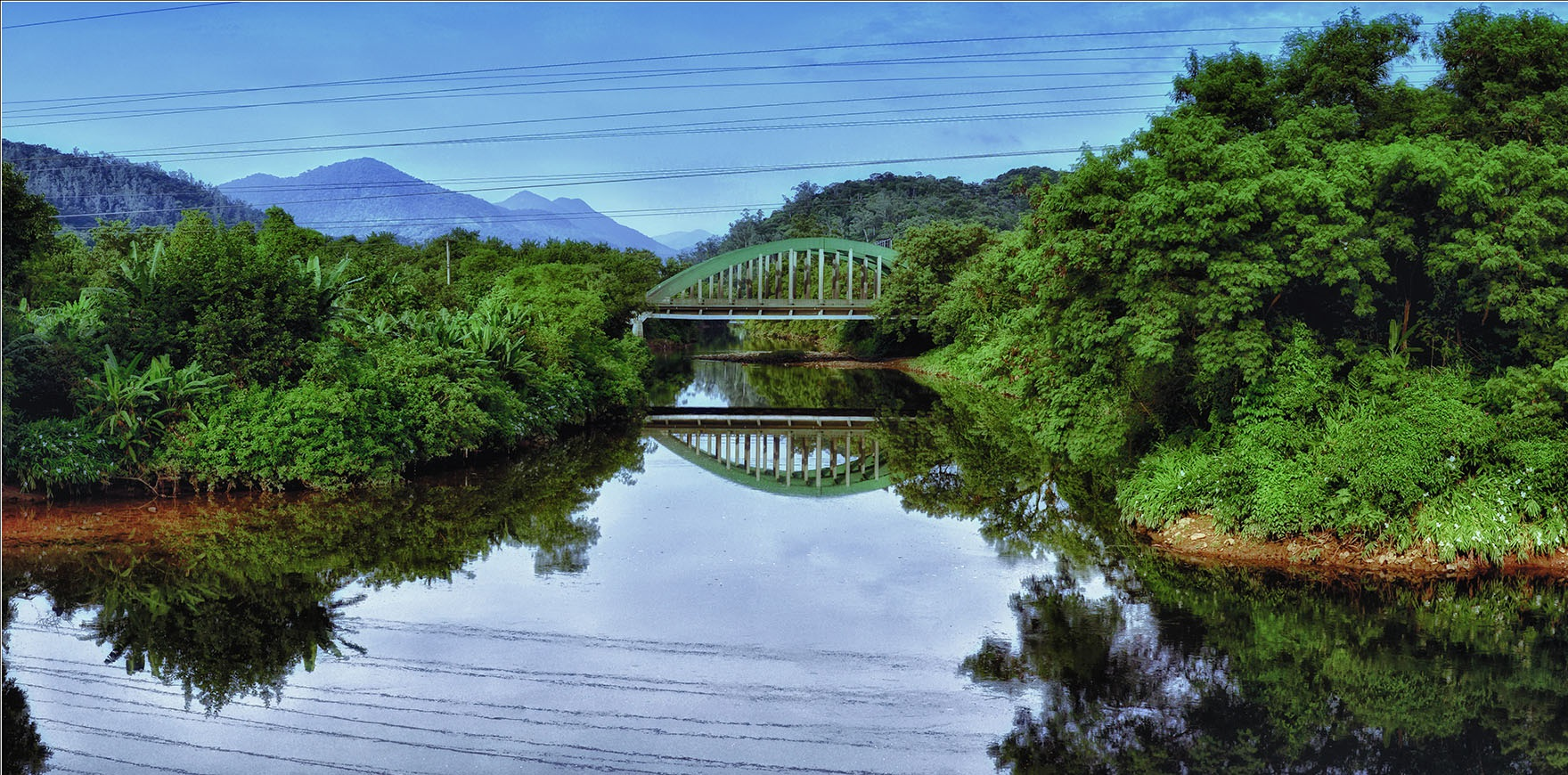

Location
- Country: Brazil

Physical characteristics
- Source
  - location: São Paulo state
  - coordinates: 23°56′S 46°57′W
- Mouth: Atlantic Ocean
  - coordinates: 23°53′S 46°25′W

The Cubatão River is a Brazilian river in the state of São Paulo. It finds its origins in latitude 23º56'11 "south and longitude 46º57'20" West. Its basin is between São Paulo and Santos. It empties out in Santos by delta type channels in the mangroves.

== Tributaries ==
- Left bank:
  - Rio Cubatão de Cima
  - Rio Pilões
  - Ribeirão das Pedras
  - Ribeirão Perequê
  - Rio Mogi
