= Guarapiranga River =

Coordinates: 23.656944°S 46.719944°W

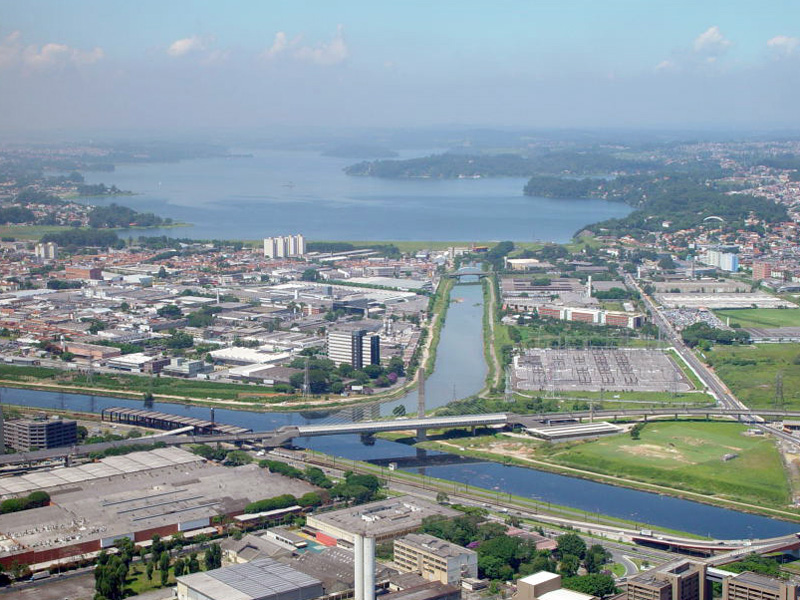
- At the foreground, the Pinheiros River; at the center, the Guarapiranga River; and at the background, the Reservoir of Guarapiranga.
- Native name: Rio Guarapiranga (Portuguese)

Location
- Country: Brazil
- Region: São Paulo city, São Paulo state

Physical characteristics
- Source
  - location: Pinheiros River, São Paulo city
- Mouth
  - location: Reservoir of Guarapiranga, São Paulo city

The Guarapiranga River (in Portuguese: Rio Guarapiranga) is a river of São Paulo state in southeastern Brazil.

== See also ==
- List of rivers of São Paulo
