= Una da Aldeia River =

- Location within Brazil
- Native name: Rio Una da Aldeia (Portuguese)

Location
- Country: Brazil

Physical characteristics
- Mouth
  - coordinates: 24.636801°S 47.428797°W
- Length: 41 kilometres (25 mi)

Basin features
- River system: Ribeira de Iguape River
- Tributaries
  - left: Espraiado River

The Una da Aldeia River (Portuguese: Rio Una da Aldeia) is a river in the south of the state of São Paulo, Brazil. It is a tributary of the Ribeira de Iguape River.

== Course ==
The Una da Aldeia River originates in the municipality of Juquiá, São Paulo, near the BR-116 highway. In its upper course it is named the Itimirim River It flows in a southeast direction, roughly parallel to the SP-222 highway, entering the municipality of Iguape. It is joined by the Espraiado River from the left, which flows from the Juréia-Itatins Ecological Station. The Una da Aldeia River continues southeast and joins the Ribeira de Iguape River not far from that river's mouth on the Atlantic Ocean.

== See also ==
- List of rivers of São Paulo

== Sources ==
- "Estação Ecológica Juréia-Itatins", Wikiaves (in Portuguese)
