= Jaguari River (Paraíba do Sul) =

- Location within Brazil
- Native name: Rio Jaguari (Portuguese)

Location
- Country: Brazil

Physical characteristics
- Source
  - location: São Paulo state
- Mouth
  - location: Paraíba do Sul
  - coordinates: 23.173893°S 45.913609°W

The Jaguari River (Portuguese: Rio Jaguari) is a river of São Paulo state in southeastern Brazil. It is a tributary of the Paraíba do Sul.

The headwaters are protected by the 292,000 hectares (720,000 acres) Mananciais do Rio Paraíba do Sul Environmental Protection Area, created in 1982 to protect the sources of the Paraíba do Sul river. The 180,373 hectares (445,710 acres) Fernão Dias Environmental Protection Area, created in 1997, also protects some of the headwaters.

== See also ==
- List of rivers of São Paulo
