= Pardo River (Rio Grande tributary) =

Coordinates: 20°10′12″S 48°38′40″W

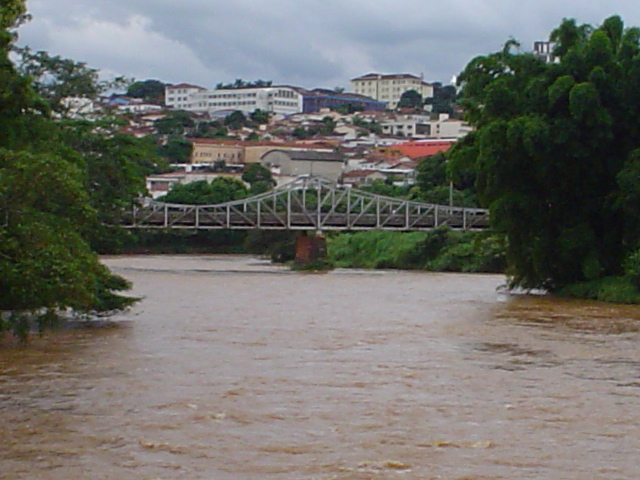
- Pardo River in São José do Rio Pardo

Location
- Country: Brazil

Physical characteristics
- Source
  - location: São Paulo state
- Mouth
  - location: Rio Grande

The Pardo River (Portuguese, Rio Pardo) is a river of southeastern Brazil. It originates in the state of Minas Gerais and flows to northwest, crossing the state of São Paulo and draining into Grande River.

== See also ==
- List of rivers of São Paulo
- List of tributaries of the Río de la Plata
