= Pardo River (Paranapanema River tributary) =

Coordinates: 22°54′43″S 49°57′57″W

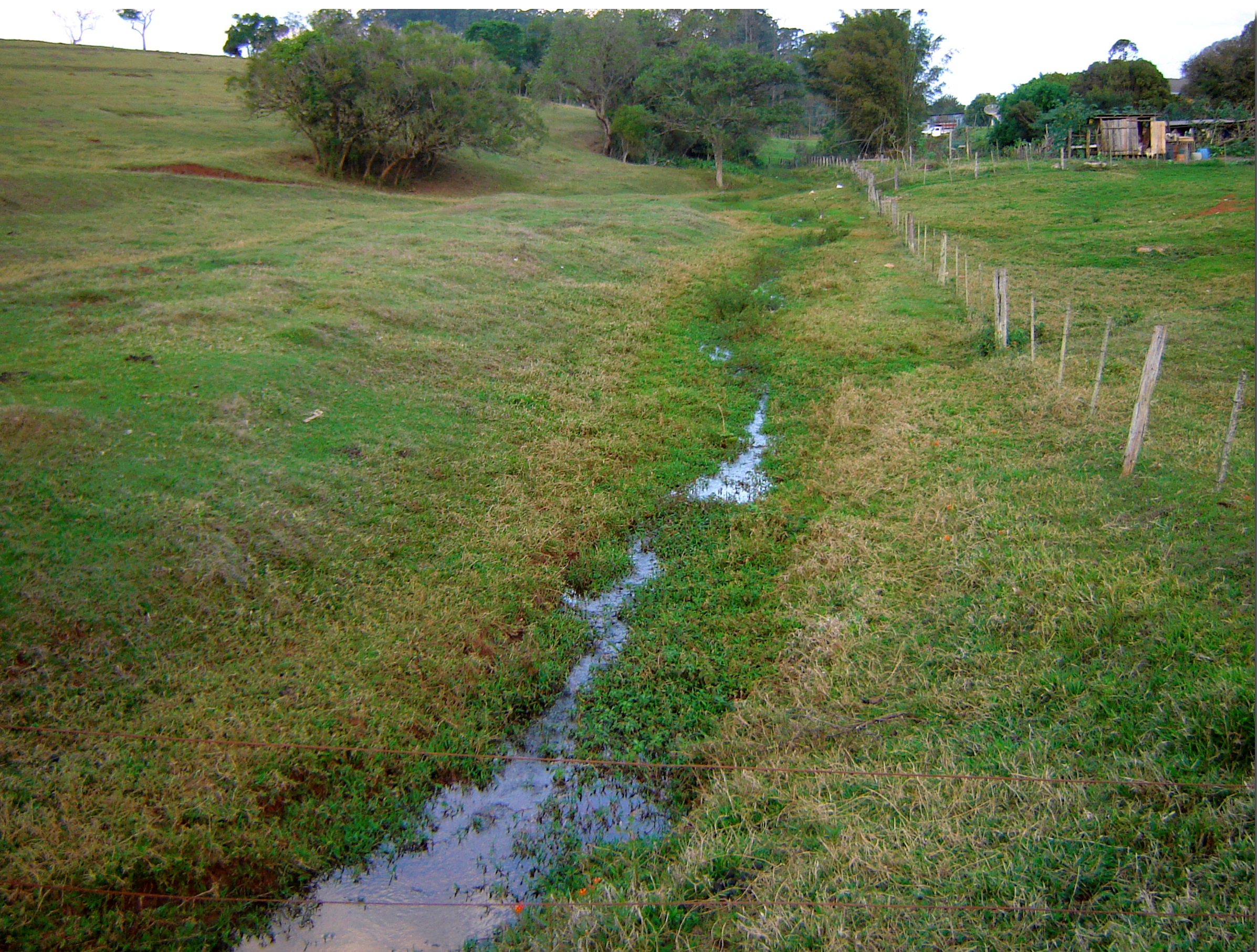

Location
- Country: Brazil

Physical characteristics
- Source
  - location: São Paulo state
- Mouth
  - location: Paranapanema River

The Pardo River (Portuguese, Rio Pardo) is a river of southern São Paulo state in southeastern Brazil. It is a tributary of the Paranapanema River.

== See also ==
- List of rivers of São Paulo
- List of tributaries of the Río de la Plata
