= Turvo River (Grande River tributary) =

River in São Paulo, Brazil; tributary of RIo Grande

Coordinates: 19°56′59″S 49°53′54″W

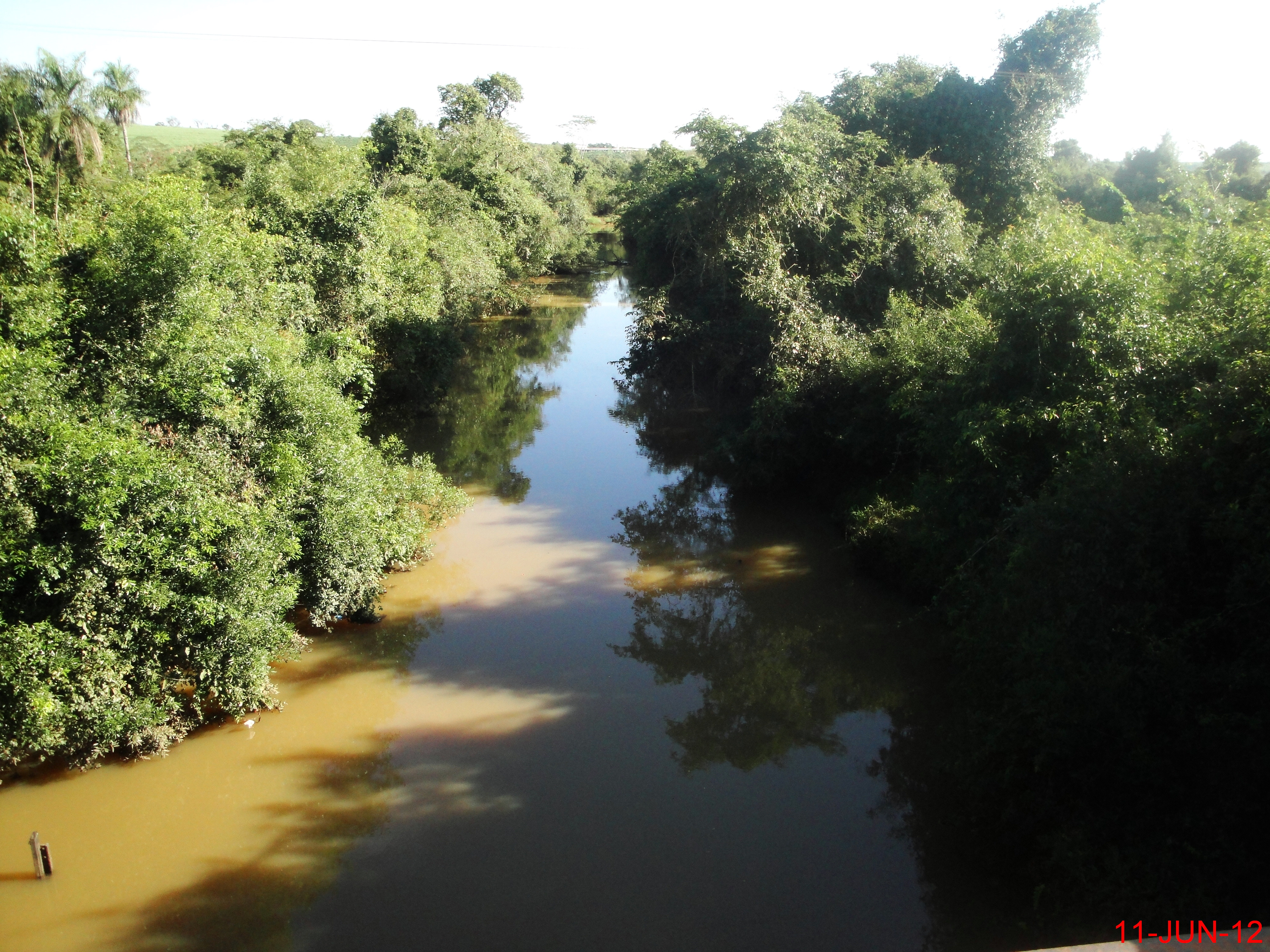

Location
- Country: Brazil

Physical characteristics
- Source
  - location: São Paulo state
- Mouth
  - location: Grande River

The Turvo River is a river of São Paulo state in southeastern Brazil. It is a tributary of the Grande River, which it joins in the reservoir formed by Água Vermelha Dam.

== See also ==
- List of rivers of São Paulo
- List of tributaries of the Río de la Plata
