= Neoplecostomus franciscoensis =

Conservation status
- Least Concern (IUCN 3.1)

Scientific classification
- Kingdom: Animalia
- Phylum: Chordata
- Class: Actinopterygii
- Division: Teleostei
- Order: Siluriformes
- Family: Loricariidae
- Genus: Neoplecostomus
- Species: N. franciscoensis

Binomial name
- Neoplecostomus franciscoensis Langeani, 1990

Species of fish

Neoplecostomus franciscoensis is a species of freshwater ray-finned fish belonging to the family Loricariidae, the suckermouth armoured catfishes, and the subfamily Hypoptopomatinae, the cascudinhos. This catfish is endemic to Brazil.

== Taxonomy ==
Neoplecostomus franciscoensis was first formally described in 1990 by the ichthyologist Francisco Langeani-Neto with its type locality given as a tributary stream of the Mutuca creek, side of road from Belo Horizonte to Nova Lima at kilometre 20, at about 20°60'S, 43°55'W, in the Brazilian state of Minas Gerais. Eschmeyer's Catalog of Fishes classifies the genus Neoplecostomus in the subfamily Hypoptopomatinae, the cascudinhos, within the suckermouth armored catfish family Loricariidae.

== Etymology ==
Neoplecostomus franciscoensis is classified within the genus Neoplecostomus, this name prefixes neo-, for "new" onto plecostomus, as this genus was proposed as a subgenus of Plecostomus, now known as Hypostomus and classified in the subfamily Hypostominae. The specific name, franciscoensis, has the Latin suffix -ensis which denotes a place, referring to the basin of the São Francisco River in Minas Gerais, where the type locality is located.

== Description ==
Neoplecostomus franciscoensis reaches a standard length of 10.8 cm (4.3 in) and has a maximum published weight of 10.7 g (0.38 oz).

== Distribution ==
Neoplecostomus franciscoensis is endemic to Brazil where it occurs in the headwater streams of the Das Velhas River and Paraopeba River.

== Conservation status ==
Neoplecostomus franciscoensis is common throughout the area in which it occurs and there is no evidence of a decline in the population. The International Union for Conservation of Nature has classified this catfish as Least Concern.
