= Harttia torrenticola =

Conservation status
- Least Concern (IUCN 3.1)

Scientific classification
- Kingdom: Animalia
- Phylum: Chordata
- Class: Actinopterygii
- Order: Siluriformes
- Family: Loricariidae
- Genus: Harttia
- Species: H. torrenticola

Binomial name
- Harttia torrenticola Oyakawa, 1993

Species of fish

Harttia torrenticola is a species of freshwater ray-finned fish belonging to the family Loricariidae, the suckermouth armored catfishes, and the subfamily Loricariinae, the mailed catfishes. This catfish is endemic to Brazil, where it is found in the Rio Velhas and Paraopeba rivers, in the São Francisco River basin of Minas Gerais. This species grows to a standard length of 13.8 cm (5.4 in).
