= Neoplecostomus yapo =

Conservation status
- Least Concern (IUCN 3.1)

Scientific classification
- Kingdom: Animalia
- Phylum: Chordata
- Class: Actinopterygii
- Order: Siluriformes
- Family: Loricariidae
- Genus: Neoplecostomus
- Species: N. yapo

Binomial name
- Neoplecostomus yapo Zawadzki, Pavanelli & Langeani, 2008

Species of fish

Neoplecostomus yapo is a species of freshwater ray-finned fish belonging to the family Loricariidae, the suckermouth armoured catfishes, and the subfamily Hypoptopomatinae, the cascudinhos. This catfish is endemic to Brazil.

== Taxonomy ==
Neoplecostomus yapo was first formally described in 2008 by the Brazilian ichthyologists Cláudio Henrique Zawadzki, Carla Simone Pavanelli Carla Simone Pavanelli and Francisco Langeani-Neto with its type locality given as the Fortaleza Stream at Fazenda Santo Amaro near Tibagi, a tributary of the Yapó River in the Tibagi River basin, in the Brazilian state of Paraná at 24°30'34"S, 50°24'49"W. Eschmeyer's Catalog of Fishes classifies the genus Neoplecostomus in the subfamily Hypoptopomatinae, the cascudinhos, within the suckermouth armored catfish family Loricariidae.

== Etymology ==
Neoplecostomus yapo is classified within the genus Neoplecostomus, this name prefixes neo-, for "new" onto plecostomus, as this genus was proposed as a subgenus of Plecostomus, now known as Hypostomus and classified in the subfamily Hypostominae. The specific name, yapo, is the name of the river draiange that the type locality is located in.

== Description ==
Neoplecostomus yapo has a single spine and 7 soft rays supporting its dorsal finwhile its anal fin is supported by a single spine and 5 soft rays. The upper body is almost wholly covered in dermal platesapart from the area around the base of the dorsal fin and the tip of the snout. The underside of the headis naked excpet for a dermal plate located close to the gill opening which bears some odontodes. There is an thoracic shield on the otherwise naked abdomen formed by small dermal plates situated between the pectoral and pelvic fins. This catfish has thick, rounded lips with the lower lip covered in papillae almost extending as far as the pectoral girdle. The barbel in the maxilla is short and joined with the lower lip, usually the tip is free. There is an unpaired dermal plate in front of the adipose fin. This species can be distinguished from almost all the other species in its genus by having hypertrophied odontodes and obvious thickened skin along the side of the snout in mature males and from N. selenae by the absence of hypertrophied odontodes and obvious thickened skin along the ridges in front of the eyes. This species has an elongated, falttened body shape and it reaches a standard length of 11 cm (4.3 in).

== Distribution and habitat ==
Neoplecostomus yapo is endemic to Brazil where it was known only from its type locality of the Fortaleza stream, a tributary of the Yapó River, Tibagi River basin, municipality of Tibagi, Paraná. This catfish occurs in shallow, headwater streams with undisturbed riparian forest with clear, cold water and a fast current over a rocky substrate.
