= Harttia loricariformis =

Conservation status
- Least Concern (IUCN 3.1)

Scientific classification
- Kingdom: Animalia
- Phylum: Chordata
- Class: Actinopterygii
- Division: Teleostei
- Order: Siluriformes
- Family: Loricariidae
- Genus: Harttia
- Species: H. loricariformis

Binomial name
- Harttia loricariformis Steindachner, 1877

Species of fish

Harttia loricariformis is a species of freshwater ray-finned fish belonging to the family Loricariidae, the suckermouth armored catfishes, and the subfamily Loricariinae, the mailed catfishes. This catfish is endemic to southeastern Brazil, where it is found in the Paraíba do Sul River basin.

== Taxonomy ==
Harttia loricariformis was first formally described in 1877 by the Austrian ichthyologist Franz Steindachner, with its type locality given as "Rio Parahyba and its tributaries". When Steindachner described this species, he classified it in the new monospecific genus Harttia, H. loraciformis being the type species of that genus by monotypy. The genus Harttia is the type species of the tribe Harttini, which is recognized by some authorities. This genus is classified within the subfamily Loricariinae of the family Loricariidae in the suborder Loricarioidei within the catfish order, Siluriformes.

== Etymology ==
Harttia loricariformis is the type species of the genus Harttia, a name which honors Charles Frederick Hartt, a geologist, paleontologist and naturalist, who collected the many specimens during the Thayer Expedition to Brazil in the years 1865–1866. The specific name, loricariformis, means "similar to Loricaria". Steindachner thought that this taxon was intermediate between the subfamilies Loricariinae and Hypostominae.

== Description ==
Harttia loricariformis reaches a maximum standard length of 18.6 cm (7.3 in).

== Distribution and habitat ==
Harttia loricariformis is endemic to southeastern Brazil, where it is found in the Paraíba do Sul River basin in the states of Espírito Santo, Minas Gerais, Rio de Janeiro and São Paulo. This catfish occurs in rivers with clear water and fast currents, at depths in excess of 1 m (3 ft 3 in), with a substrate of sand and stones in stretches where the river is between 10 and 50 m (33 and 164 ft) wide.
