= Harttia intermontana =

Scientific classification
- Kingdom: Animalia
- Phylum: Chordata
- Class: Actinopterygii
- Order: Siluriformes
- Family: Loricariidae
- Genus: Harttia
- Species: H. intermontana

Binomial name
- Harttia intermontana J. C. Oliveira & Oyakawa, 2019

Species of catfish

Harttia intermontana is a species of freshwater ray-finned fish belonging to the family Loricariidae, the suckermouth armored catfishes, and the subfamily Loricariinae, the mailed catfishes. This catfish is endemic to Brazil where it occurs in the headwaters of the Doce River basin in the Mantiqueira Mountains in the state of Minas Gerais. The species reaches at least 8 cm (3.1 inches) in standard length. It was described in 2019 by Jose Carlos de Oliveira (of the Federal University of Juiz de Fora) and Osvaldo Takeshi Oyakawa (of the University of São Paulo) alongside the species Neoplecostomus pirangaensis and Pareiorhaphis togoroi. FishBase does not yet list this species.
