= Neoplecostomus botucatu =

Conservation status
- Critically Endangered (IUCN 3.1)

Scientific classification
- Kingdom: Animalia
- Phylum: Chordata
- Class: Actinopterygii
- Division: Teleostei
- Order: Siluriformes
- Family: Loricariidae
- Genus: Neoplecostomus
- Species: N. botucatu

Binomial name
- Neoplecostomus botucatu Roxo, Oliveira & Zawadzki, 2012

Species of catfish

Neoplecostomus botucatu is a species of freshwater ray-finned fish belonging to the family Loricariidae, the suckermouth armoured catfishes, and the subfamily Hypoptopomatinae, the cascudinhos. This catfish is endemic to Brazil.

== Taxonomy ==
Neoplecostomus botucatu was first formally described in 2012 by the ichthyologists Fábio Fernandes Roxo, Claudio de Oliveira and Cláudio Henrique Zawadzki, with its type locality given as the stream of Åguas de Madalena, a tributary of the Pardo River, in the Paranapanema basin at 22°59'25"S, 48°25'37"W, in the Municipality of Botucatu, in the Brazilian state of São Paulo. Eschmeyer's Catalog of Fishes classifies the genus Neoplecostomus in the subfamily Hypoptopomatinae, the cascudinhos, within the suckermouth armored catfish family Loricariidae.

== Etymology ==
Neoplecostomus botucatu is classified within the genus Neoplecostomus. This name prefixes neo-, for "new", onto plecostomus, as this genus was proposed as a subgenus of Plecostomus, now known as Hypostomus and classified in the subfamily Hypostominae. The specific name, botucatu, refers to the type locality, the Municipality of Botucatu in São Paulo state.

== Description ==
Neoplecostomus botucatu has a single spine, seven soft rays on its dorsal fin, and six soft rays in its anal fin. It can be told apart from almost all other species in its genus by its poorly developed adipose fin, combined with the obvious dark spots all over its body and lack of bands on the back. These spots are not present in Neoplecostomus paranensis, which has a banded back, or the other Neoplecostomus, with a poorly developed adipose fin. This species has an elongated body shape and it reaches a standard length of 10.2 cm (4.0 in).

== Distribution ==
Neoplecostomus botucatu is endemic to Brazil, where it is known only from its type locality, the Åguas de Madalena stream in Botucatu, São Paulo. Despite intensive sampling elsewhere in the Pardo River system, it has not been found anywhere else.

== Conservations status ==
Neoplecostomus botucatu is, as far as is known, restricted to a single small stream. The catfishes in this genus require well-oxygentated, fast-flowing streams with rocky substrates. A dam is planned for the Pardo River upstream from the stream where this species occurs, and this may have an effect on the water quality downstream. The International Union for Conservation of Nature have, therefore, classified N. botocatu as Crtitcally Endangered.
