= Harttia tuna =

Conservation status
- Least Concern (IUCN 3.1)

Scientific classification
- Kingdom: Animalia
- Phylum: Chordata
- Class: Actinopterygii
- Order: Siluriformes
- Family: Loricariidae
- Genus: Harttia
- Species: H. tuna

Binomial name
- Harttia tuna Covain & Fisch-Muller, 2012

Species of catfish

Harttia tuna is a species of freshwater ray-finned fish belonging to the family Loricariidae, the suckermouth armored catfishes, and the subfamily Loricariinae, the mailed catfishes. This catfish is endemic to Brazil where they occur in the Paru de Oeste River and the Jari River in the states of Pará and Amapá. This species reaches a maximum standard length of 17.2 cm (6.8 in).

Harttia tuna has the specific name tuna, this is a Tri-Wayana name meaning "water" or "river", an allusion to the similarity of this species to Harttia fluminensis, a species which has a specific name that also refers to rivers.
