= Neoplecostomus variipictus =

Conservation status
- Data Deficient (IUCN 3.1)

Scientific classification
- Kingdom: Animalia
- Phylum: Chordata
- Class: Actinopterygii
- Division: Teleostei
- Order: Siluriformes
- Family: Loricariidae
- Genus: Neoplecostomus
- Species: N. variipictus

Binomial name
- Neoplecostomus variipictus Bizerril, 1995

Species of fish

Neoplecostomus variipictus is a species of freshwater ray-finned fish belonging to the family Loricariidae, the suckermouth armoured catfishes, and the subfamily Hypoptopomatinae, the cascudinhos. This catfish is endemic to Brazil.

== Taxonomy ==
Neoplecostomus variipictus was first formally described in 1995 by the Brazilian ichthyologist Carlos Roberto Silveira Fontanelle Bizerril with its type locality given as the Santo Antônio River, tributary of Rio Bengala, in the basin of the Paraíba do Sul. Eschmeyer's Catalog of Fishes classifies the genus Neoplecostomus in the subfamily Hypoptopomatinae, the cascudinhos, within the suckermouth armored catfish family Loricariidae.

== Etymology ==
Neoplecostomus variipictus is classified within the genus Neoplecostomus, this name prefixes neo-, for "new" onto plecostomus, as this genus was proposed as a subgenus of Plecostomus, now known as Hypostomus and classified in the subfamily Hypostominae. The specific name, variipictus, combines the Latin words varius, which means "varied", and pictus, meaning "painted", because this species has been described as looking as if it has been spotted with paint.

== Description ==
Neoplecostomus variipictus has a spotted pattern on the body, and it reaches a standard length of 9 cm (3.5 in).

== Distribution ==
Neoplecostomus variipictus is endemic to Brazil in the basin of the River Paraiba do Sul in the Brazilian states of São Paulo, Rio de Janeiro and Minas Gerais.

== Conservation status ==
Neoplecostomus variipictus is of doubtful validity as a species, as it may be a junior synonym of N. microps, and almost nothing is known about its biology. ecology or population. The International Union for Conservation of Nature have classified this taxon as Data Deficient.
