= Harttia gracilis =

Conservation status
- Near Threatened (IUCN 3.1)

Scientific classification
- Kingdom: Animalia
- Phylum: Chordata
- Class: Actinopterygii
- Order: Siluriformes
- Family: Loricariidae
- Genus: Harttia
- Species: H. gracilis

Binomial name
- Harttia gracilis Oyakawa, 1993

Species of fish

Harttia gracilis is a species of freshwater ray-finned fish belonging to the family Loricariidae, the suckermouth armored catfishes, and the subfamily Loricariinae, the mailed catfishes. This catfish is endemic to Brazil where it is found in the São João and upper Paraná River basins in Minas Gerais and São Paulo. This species grows to a standard length of 10.1 cm (4.0 in).
