= Henry Weed Fowler =

American zoologist (1878-1965)

- Born: March 23, 1878
- Died: June 21, 1965 (aged 87)
- Education: Stanford University
- Occupation: zoologist

Henry Weed Fowler (March 23, 1878 – June 21, 1965) was an American zoologist born in Holmesburg, Pennsylvania.

He studied at Stanford University under David Starr Jordan. He joined the Academy of Natural Sciences in Philadelphia and worked as an assistant from 1903 to 1922, associate curator of vertebrates from 1922 to 1934, curator of fish and reptiles from 1934 to 1940, and curator of fish from 1940 to 1965.

He published material on numerous topics including crustaceans, birds, reptiles and amphibians, but his most important work was on fish. In 1927, he co-founded the American Society of Ichthyologists and Herpetologists and acted as treasurer until the end of 1927.

In 1934, he went to Cuba, alongside Charles Cadwalader (president of the Academy of Natural Sciences of Philadelphia), at the invitation of Ernest Hemingway to study billfishes, he stayed with Hemingway for six weeks and the three men developed a friendship which continued after this trip and Hemingway sent specimens to, and corresponded with, both Fowler and Cadwalader afterwards. Fowler named the spinycheek scorpionfish (Neomerithe hemingwayi) in honor of the author. Hemingway learnt a lot about marine life from his two guests, much of which he was said to have used in The Old Man and the Sea.

== Expedition ==
From 1936–1937, he took part in the Second Bolivian Expedition for the Academy of Natural Sciences of Philadelphia, 1936–1937.

== Death ==
He died in Newtown, Bucks County, Pennsylvania.

== Publications ==
- The Fishes of Oceania (1928–1974)
- A study of the fishes of the southern Piedmont and coastal plain (1945)
- The fishes of the groups Elasmobranchii, Holocephali, Isospondyli, and Ostarophysi[sic] obtained by the United States Bureau of fisheries steamer "Albatross" in 1907 to 1910, chiefly in the Philippine islands and adjacent seas (1941)
- The fishes of the families Pomacentridae, Labridae, and Callyodontidae, collected by the United States Bureau of fisheries steamer "Albatross", chiefly in Philippine seas and adjacent waters (1928)
- The fishes of the families Amiidae, Chandidae, Duleidae, and Serranidae : obtained by the United States Bureau of fisheries steamer "Albatross" in 1907 to 1910, chiefly in the Philippine islands and adjacent seas (1930)
- The fishes of the families Pseudochromidae, Lobotidae, Pempheridae, Priacanthidae, Lutjanidae, Pomadasyidae, and Teraponidae, collected by the United States Bureau of fisheries steamer "Albatross," chiefly in Philippine seas and adjacent waters (1931)
- The fishes of the families Banjosidae, Lethrinidae, Sparidae, Girellidae, Kyphosidae, Oplegnathidae, Gerridae, Mullidae, Emmelichthyidae, Sciaenidae, Sillaginidae, Arripidae, and Enoplosidae : collected by the United States Bureau of Fisheries steamer "Albatross," chiefly in Philippine seas and adjacent waters (1933)
- The fishes of the series Capriformes, Ephippiformes, and Squamipennes, collected by the United States Bureau of fisheries steamer "Albatross", chiefly in Philippine seas and adjacent waters (1929–1962)
- The fishes of the George Vanderbilt south Pacific expedition, 1937 (1938)
- Archaeological fishbones collected by E.W. Gifford in Fiji (1955)
- Fishes of the Red Sea and southern Arabia (1956)
- Descriptions and figures of new fishes obtained in Philippine seas and adjacent waters by the United States Bureau of fisheries steamer "Albatross," (1943)
- Fishes of Fiji (1959)
- Fishes of Guam, Hawaii, Samoa, and Tahiti (1925)
- Fishes of the tropical central Pacific (1927)
- A description of the fossil fish remains of the Cretaceous, Eocene and Miocene formations of New Jersey (1911)
- The marine fishes of West Africa : based on the collection of the American Museum Congo Expedition, 1909–1915 (1936)
- Fishes of Hawaii, Johnston Islands, and Wake Island (1925)
- The fishes of New Jersey (1906)

== Taxa named in his honor ==
- The catfish Harttia fowleri (Pellegrin, 1908)
- Ophichthus fowleri, also known as the Fowler's snake eel, is a species of eel in the family Ophichthidae.

== Taxa described by him ==
- See Category:Taxa named by Henry Weed Fowler
