= Neoplecostomus ribeirensis =

Conservation status
- Least Concern (IUCN 3.1)

Scientific classification
- Kingdom: Animalia
- Phylum: Chordata
- Class: Actinopterygii
- Order: Siluriformes
- Family: Loricariidae
- Genus: Neoplecostomus
- Species: N. ribeirensis

Binomial name
- Neoplecostomus ribeirensis Langeani, 1990

Species of fish

Neoplecostomus ribeirensis is a species of freshwater ray-finned fish belonging to the family Loricariidae, the suckermouth armoured catfishes, and the subfamily Hypoptopomatinae, the cascudinhos. This catfish is endemic to Brazil.

== Taxonomy ==
Neoplecostomus ribeirensis was first formally described in 2012 by the Brazilian ichthyologist Francisco Langeani-Neto with its type locality given as a stream off the Bananal River, Ribeira River basin, 7 km (4.3 mi) from the road between Biguá and Iguapé in the Brazilian state of São Paulo. Eschmeyer's Catalog of Fishes classifies the genus Neoplecostomus in the subfamily Hypoptopomatinae, the cascudinhos, within the suckermouth armored catfish family Loricariidae.

== Etymology ==
Neoplecostomus ribeirensis is classified within the genus Neoplecostomus, this name prefixes neo-, for "new" onto plecostomus, as this genus was proposed as a subgenus of Plecostomus, now known as Hypostomus and classified in the subfamily Hypostominae. The specific name, ribeirensis, puts the Latin suffix -ensis, which denotes a place, onto ribeira, denoting the Ribeira de Iguape River basin where this catfish is endemic.

== Description ==
Neoplecostomus ribeirensis has an elongated body shape and it reaches a standard length of 9 cm (3.5 in).

== Distribution ==
Neoplecostomus ribeirensis is endemic to Brazil where it is only known from the Ribeira de Iguape river basin. It has been reported from the Tibagi and Iguaçu river basins but these reports need confirmation. Within the Ribeira de Iguape river basin this catfish has been recorded from Corujas river, Tapiraí in the Serra de Paranapiacaba, the Ipiranga, Água Doce, Pilões and Betari river basins
