= Neoplecostomus jaguari =

Conservation status
- Data Deficient (IUCN 3.1)

Scientific classification
- Kingdom: Animalia
- Phylum: Chordata
- Class: Actinopterygii
- Division: Teleostei
- Order: Siluriformes
- Family: Loricariidae
- Genus: Neoplecostomus
- Species: N. jaguari

Binomial name
- Neoplecostomus jaguari Andrade & Langeani, 2014

Species of catfish

Neoplecostomus jaguari is a species of freshwater ray-finned fish belonging to the family Loricariidae, the suckermouth armoured catfishes, and the subfamily Hypoptopomatinae, the cascudinhos. This catfish is endemic to Brazil.

== Taxonomy ==
Neoplecostomus jaguari was first formally described in 2014 by the ichthyologists Breno Neves de Andrade and Francisco Langeani-Neto with its type locality given as Extrema, Minas Gerais in the ribeirão do Forja at 22°52'20.0"S 46°17'27.0"W. Eschmeyer's Catalog of Fishes classifies the genus Neoplecostomus in the subfamily Hypoptopomatinae, the cascudinhos, within the suckermouth armored catfish family Loricariidae.

== Etymology ==
Neoplecostomus jaguari is classified within the genus Neoplecostomus, this name prefixes neo-, for "new" onto plecostomus, as this genus was proposed as a subgenus of Plecostomus, now known as Hypostomus and classified in the subfamily Hypostominae. The specific name, jauguari, is the name of the river basin, that of the Jaguari River, that the type locality of Extrema in Minas Gerais is located in.

== Description ==
Neoplecostomus jaguari has its dorsal fin supported by 9 soft rays with 6 supporting the anal fin. This catfish shows clear sexual dimorphism with the males and females differing in the numbers of teeth on the premaxilla and dentary, the males having around half the number of females. The size of the mandible also differs, with the females being larger and the females have longer and thinner teeth than the males. Both sexes of a plate on the snout near th nostril. It also has between 4 and 6 plates between the frontal and prefrontal on the head. This species has an elongated body sgape and it reaches a standard length of 9.3 cm (3.7 in). The males also have urogenital papilla.

== Distribution ==
Neoplecostomus jaguari is endemic to Brazil where it is currently known to occur in the streams of Forja and Casca d’Antas, both tributaries of the Jaguari River in the upper Paraná River basin in Minas Gerais.

== Conservation status ==
Neoplecostomus jaguari is classified as Date Deficient by the International Union for Conservation of Nature because there is not enough data on its population or threats to that population, distribution and biology.
