= Neoplecostomus corumba =

Conservation status
- Least Concern (IUCN 3.1)

Scientific classification
- Kingdom: Animalia
- Phylum: Chordata
- Class: Actinopterygii
- Division: Teleostei
- Order: Siluriformes
- Family: Loricariidae
- Genus: Neoplecostomus
- Species: N. corumba

Binomial name
- Neoplecostomus corumba Zawadzki, Pavanelli & Langeani, 2008

Species of fish

Neoplecostomus corumba is a species of freshwater ray-finned fish belonging to the family Loricariidae, the suckermouth armoured catfishes, and the subfamily Hypoptopomatinae, the cascudinhos. This catfish is endemic to Brazil.

== Taxonomy ==
Neoplecostomus corumba was first formally described in 2012 by the ichthyologists Cláudio Henrique Zawadzki, Carla Simone Pavanelli and Francisco Langeani with its type locality given as the stream of Gameleira, a tributary of Corumbá River, in the Paranaíba basin at 17°59'S, 48°29'W, in the Municipality of Corumbaíba, in the Brazilian state of Goiás. Eschmeyer's Catalog of Fishes classifies the genus Neoplecostomus in the subfamily Hypoptopomatinae, the cascudinhos, within the suckermouth armored catfish family Loricariidae.

== Etymology ==
Neoplecostomus corumba is classified within the genus Neoplecostomus, this name prefixes neo-, for "new" onto plecostomus, as this genus was proposed as a subgenus of Plecostomus, now known as Hypostomus and classified in the subfamily Hypostominae. The specific name, corumba, refers to the Corumba river drainage, in which the type locality is located.

== Description ==
Neoplecostomus corumba has a single spine and 7 soft rays in its dorsal fin and a single spine and 6 soft rays in its anal fin. It has an elongated bosy shape with a depressed cross section and recahes a standard length of 8.1 cm (3.2 in). The upper body is almost completely covered in dermal plates, except for a naked areas around the base of the dorsal fin and the tip of the snout. The lower surface of the head i snaked aprt from a small odontode bearing plate in front of the gill slit, with dermal platelets found between the pectoral and pelvic fins. All of the main fins have a spine and these spines all have odontodes on them, except for the spine in the dorsal fin, an adipose fin is always present.

== Distribution ==
Neoplecostomus corumba is endemic to Brazil where it is known only from its type locality Gameleira stream, a tributary of the Corumbá River, Paranaíba River basin, Corumbaíba, Goiás.
