= Pará Falls =

Series of waterfalls on the Caura River in Bolívar, Venezuela

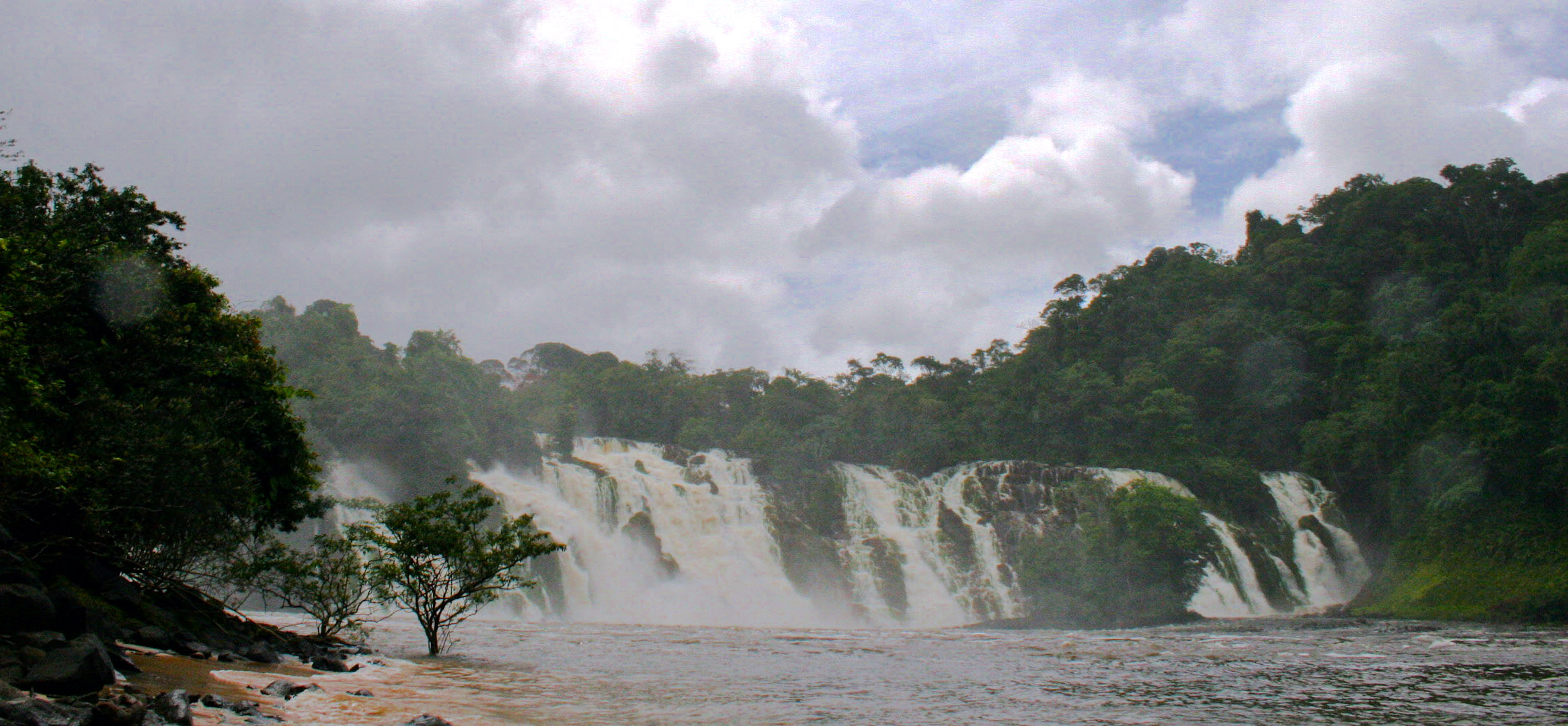
- Location: Bolívar, Venezuela
- Coordinates: 06°18′40″N 64°31′26″W
- Type: Segmented
- Total height: 64 m (210 ft)
- Average width: 5,608 m (18,399 ft)
- Watercourse: Caura River
- Average flow rate: 3,540 m^{3}/s (125,000 cu ft/s)

The Pará Falls (Salto Pará) are large waterfalls on the Caura River in Bolívar, Venezuela.

The falls are located 210 kilometres (130 mi) upstream from the confluence of the Caura and Orinoco, and are considered the boundary between the upper and lower sections of the river. Due to the difficulty of portaging past the falls, they are a traditional boundary for the Ye'kuana and Kalina tribes.

French naturalist Eugène André was the first European to describe the falls, on his 1900 exploration of the Caura River. In an article for The Geographical Journal he wrote:

The falls of Pará constitute a formidable barrier to the navigation of the Caura. Just above the falls the river divides to form an island of between 7 and 9 miles in length. By a succession of cataracts, the two streams rush through gorges on each side of the island to meet at its foot. The right-hand stream is of much greater volume than that on the left, which, after a severe drought, dries almost completely up.

In 1976 the state owned power company CADAFE studied the Pará falls as a potential site for a hydroelectric plant. These plans were later dropped due to unsuitable geology.

As there are no roads in the area, the falls are most easily reached by boat.

== See also ==
- List of waterfalls
- List of waterfalls by flow rate
