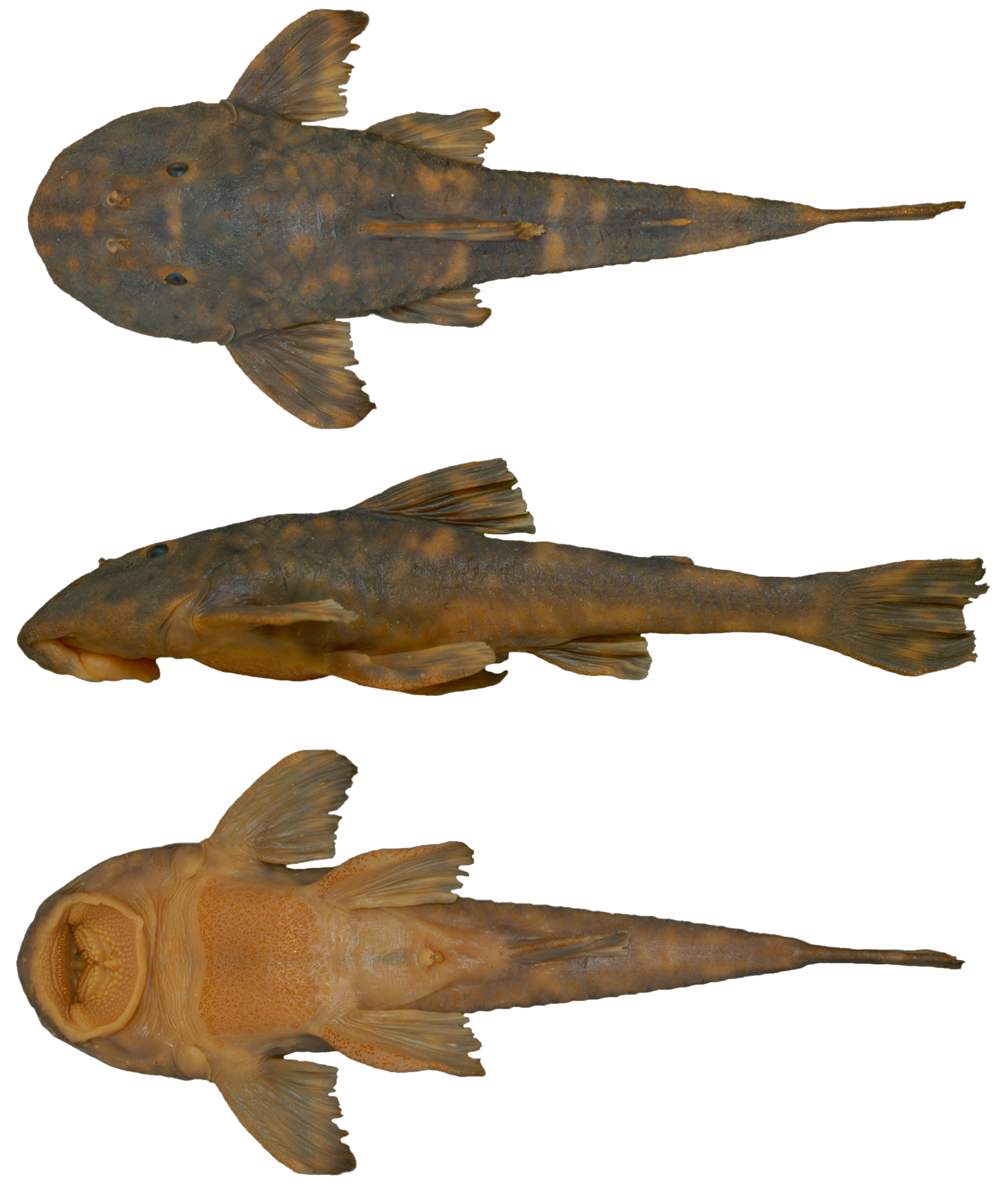
- Neoplecostomus sapucai

Scientific classification
- Kingdom: Animalia
- Phylum: Chordata
- Class: Actinopterygii
- Order: Siluriformes
- Family: Loricariidae
- Subfamily: Hypoptopomatinae
- Genus: Neoplecostomus; C. H. Eigenmann & R. S. Eigenmann, 1888

Type species
- Plecostomus microps Steindachner, 1877

= Neoplecostomus =

Genus of fishes

Neoplecostomus is a genus of freshwater ray-finned fishes belonging to the family Loricariidae, the suckermouth armored catfishes, and the subfamily Hypoptopomatinae, the cascudinhos. The catfishes in this genus are found in South America.

== Taxonomy ==
Neoplecostomus was first proposed as new subgenus of Plecostomus in 1888 by the German-American ichthyologist Carl H. Eigenmann and his ichthyologist wife Rosa Smith Eigenmann with Plecostomus microps designated as its type species. P. microps was originally described in 1877 by the Austrian ichthyologist Franz Steindachner with its type locality given as Rio de Janeiro, maybe the Parahyba River. This genus is sometimes placed in the subfamily Neoplecostominae but Eschmeyer's Catalog of Fishes classifies this genus in the subfamily Hypoptopomatinae, the cascudinhos, within the suckermouth armored catfish family Loricariidae.

== Etymology ==
Neoplecostomus prefixes neo-, for "new" onto plecostomus, as this genus was proposed as a subgenus of Plecostomus, now known as Hypostomus and classified in the subfamily Hypostominae.

== Species ==
There are currently 21 recognized species in this genus:

- Neoplecostomus altimontanus Uzeda, Paiola, Siqueira-Cesar, Okubo, Marques-Frisoni, B. N. Andrade & Langeani, 2024
- Neoplecostomus bandeirante Roxo, C. de Oliveira & Zawadzki, 2012
- Neoplecostomus botucatu Roxo, C. de Oliveira & Zawadzki, 2012
- Neoplecostomus canastra Roxo, Silva, Zawadzki & Oliveira, 2017
- Neoplecostomus corumba Zawadzki, Pavanelli & Langeani, 2008
- Neoplecostomus doceensis Roxo, G. S. C. Silva, Zawadzki & C. de Oliveira, 2014
- Neoplecostomus espiritosantensis Langeani, 1990
- Neoplecostomus franciscoensis Langeani, 1990
- Neoplecostomus granosus (Valenciennes, 1840)
- Neoplecostomus jaguari B. N. Andrade & Langeani, 2014
- Neoplecostomus langeanii Roxo, C. de Oliveira]& Zawadzki, 2012
- Neoplecostomus microps (Steindachner, 1877)
- Neoplecostomus paranensis Langeani, 1990
- Neoplecostomus paraty Cherobim, Lazzarotto & Langeani, 2017
- Neoplecostomus pirangaensis J. C. Oliveira & Oyakawa, 2019
- Neoplecostomus ribeirensis Langeani, 1990
- Neoplecostomus sapucai Uzeda, Paiola, Siqueira-Cesar, Okubo, Marques-Frisoni B. N. Andrade & Langeani, 2024
- Neoplecostomus selenae Zawadzki, Pavanelli & Langeani, 2008
- Neoplecostomus variipictus Bizerril, 1995
- Neoplecostomus watersi G. S. C. Silva, Reia, Zawadzki & Roxo, 2019
- Neoplecostomus yapo Zawadzki, Pavanelli & Langeani, 2008

== Characteristics ==
Neoplecostomus catfishes can be distinguished from all other loricariids by a modified shield of small plates on the abdomen with posteriorly directed odontodes; the shield appears to act as a holdfast. The color pattern is generally mottled brown with the abdomen white. The head is long, rounded, and shovel-shaped. The fin spines are weak. They range from about 8 to 11 cm (3.1–4.3 in) SL.

== Distribution and habitat ==
Neoplecostomus catfishes are endemic to Brazil where they live in fast-flowing water.
