= Orville Adalbert Derby =

American geologist

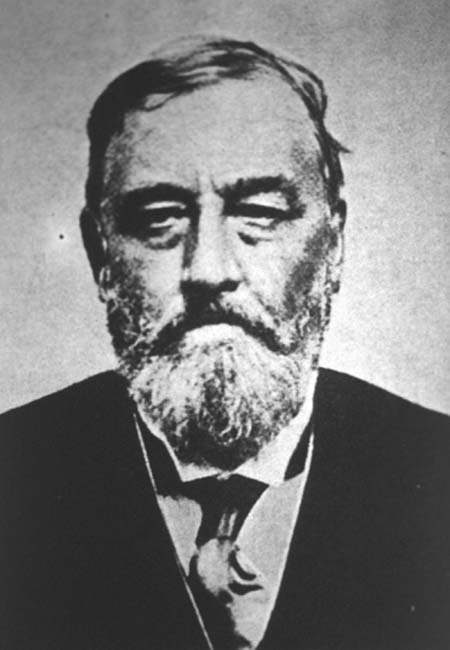
Orville Adalbert Derby

Orville Adalbert Derby (Portuguese pronunciation: [ˈɔʁviw ˈdɛʁbi]; July 23, 1851 in Kelloggsville, New York – November 27, 1915) was an American geologist who worked in Brazil.

== Education ==
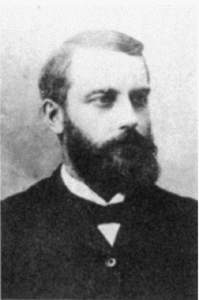
Orville Adalbert Derby

Derby studied geology at Cornell University, obtaining his degree in 1873. While a student, he was invited in 1870 by his professor Charles Frederick Hartt (1840–1878) to follow him in study travel to Brazil (the Morgan Expedition), and returning with him in 1871, this time going to the Tapajós River in the Amazon. Just after his graduation, Derby accepted the post of assistant professor at Cornell and briefly substituted for Hartt during another travel to Brazil in 1874. In June of the same year, Derby defended his doctoral thesis on the carboniferous brachiopoda in the Amazon.

== Brazil ==
When Hartt organized the first Geological Commission of the Empire of Brazil, Derby was nominated as its assistant and returned to Brazil in December 1875. In 1877, with the end of the Commission, Derby decided to stay in Brazil and accepted a post at the National Museum of Rio de Janeiro. He became also a member and director of the Geographic and Geological Commission of São Paulo from 1886 to 1904. This commission later originated the Astronomical and Geophysical Institute of the University of São Paulo. Derby founded also the first Botanical Gardens in São Paulo ("Horto Botânico"). In 1906 he was nominated to the Brazilian Geographic and Geological Survey.

Derby worked in many domains of the geological sciences, such as mineralogy, economic geology, physical geography, cartography, petrography, meteorology, archeology and paleontology.

=== Publications ===
He published 173 papers on the geology of Brazil from 1873 to 1915. He was also the publisher of one of the first geological maps of Brazil, in 1915.

== Personal life and death ==
Derby never married and led a solitary existence, living mostly in hotel rooms. After the failure of an invitation by the state government of Bahia, he returned to Rio de Janeiro and committed suicide in a hotel room, on November 27, 1915, a few months after gaining Brazilian citizenship. He was 64 years old. After Derby's unexpected death, staff of the survey realised that they did not have any recent picture of him. They dispatched some men to Derby's hotel room, where they cleaned him up, sat him in a chair and photographed him, holding his eyes open with matchsticks.
