= Harttia dissidens =

Conservation status
- Vulnerable (IUCN 3.1)

Scientific classification
- Kingdom: Animalia
- Phylum: Chordata
- Class: Actinopterygii
- Order: Siluriformes
- Family: Loricariidae
- Genus: Harttia
- Species: H. dissidens

Binomial name
- Harttia dissidens Rapp Py-Daniel & E. C. de Oliveira, 2001

Species of fish

Harttia dissidens is a species of freshwater ray-finned fish belonging to the family Loricariidae, the suckermouth armored catfishes, and the subfamily Loricariinae, the mailed catfishes. This catfish is endemic to Brazil where it is found in the Tapajós River basin in the state of Pará. This species attains a maximum standard length of 7.1 cm (2.8 in).
