= Harttia merevari =

Conservation status
- Data Deficient (IUCN 3.1)

Scientific classification
- Kingdom: Animalia
- Phylum: Chordata
- Class: Actinopterygii
- Order: Siluriformes
- Family: Loricariidae
- Genus: Harttia
- Species: H. merevari

Binomial name
- Harttia merevari Provenzano, Machado-Allison, Chernoff, Willink & Petry, 2005

Species of fish

Harttia merevari is a species of freshwater ray-finned fish belonging to the family Loricariidae, the suckermouth armored catfishes, and the subfamily Loricariinae, the mailed catfishes. This catfish is endemic to Venezuela where it is found in the upper Caura River.

== Characteristics ==
Harttia merevari is distinguished from similar species by the presence of a naked abdomen, two or three preanal plates, a bony plate before each branchial opening, seven lateral plates between the pectoral and pelvic fins, a short maxillary barbel attached to the oral disk by a fleshy fold. The head, dorsal surface and anterior portion of the species' body are light or dark yellow with numerous, round black spots, while the posterior region of the body is light or dark yellow with five black transverse bands, with the dorsal central area of the two anterior bands diffused.

== Etymology ==
Harttia merevari has the specific name merevari. Merevari is the Ye'kuana name for the Caura River, of Bolívar State, the type locality.
