= Neoplecostomus pirangaensis =

Scientific classification
- Kingdom: Animalia
- Phylum: Chordata
- Class: Actinopterygii
- Order: Siluriformes
- Family: Loricariidae
- Genus: Neoplecostomus
- Species: N. pirangaensis

Binomial name
- Neoplecostomus pirangaensis Oliveira & Oyakawa, 2019

Species of catfish

Neoplecostomus pirangaensis is a species of freshwater ray-finned fish belonging to the family Loricariidae, the suckermouth armoured catfishes, and the subfamily Hypoptopomatinae, the cascudinhos. This catfish is endemic to Brazil.

== Taxonomy ==
Neoplecostomus pirangaensis was first formally described in 2019 by the Brazilian ichthyologists José Carlos de Oliveira & Osvaldo Takeshi Oyakawa with its type locality given as the Piranga River, at the boundaries of the municipalities of Carandaí and Senhora dos Remédios in the Doce River basin in the Brazilian state of Minas Gerais at 43°42'53"W, 20°58'54"S at an elevation of 794 m (2,605 ft). Eschmeyer's Catalog of Fishes classifies the genus Neoplecostomus in the subfamily Hypoptopomatinae, the cascudinhos, within the suckermouth armored catfish family Loricariidae.

== Etymology ==
Neoplecostomus pirangaensis is classified within the genus Neoplecostomus, this name prefixes neo-, for "new" onto plecostomus, as this genus was proposed as a subgenus of Plecostomus, now known as Hypostomus and classified in the subfamily Hypostominae. The specific name, pirangaensis, puts the Latin suffix -ensis, which denotes a place, onto Piranga, the river basin in which this species occurs.

== Description ==
Neoplecostomus pirangaensis may be told apaty from almost all other Neoplecostomus species as it has no vestige of an adipose fin, the plain, black colour of adults. This species also has relatively larger and less numerous teeth. This catfish does not have fleshy folds on its lips, while the sympatric N. doceensis does. It reaches a maximum standard length of 82.7 mm (3.26 in).

== Distribution ==
Neoplecostomus pirangaensis is endemic to Brazil where it is known only from two locations in the Piranga River drainage in the Doce River system.
