= Neoplecostomus altimontanus =

Scientific classification
- Domain: Eukaryota
- Kingdom: Animalia
- Phylum: Chordata
- Class: Actinopterygii
- Order: Siluriformes
- Family: Loricariidae
- Genus: Neoplecostomus
- Species: N. altimontanus

Binomial name
- Neoplecostomus altimontanus Uzeda et al., 2024

Species of catfish

Neoplecostomus altimontanus, or high mountain armored catfish, was discovered in 2010 and also 2023 while surveying rivers in Minas Gerais, Brazil. It is described as having a sort of armor of bony plates, and copper-colored teeth. It grows to 4 inches in length. The species have broad heads and moderately sized eyes. It also has a blotchy pattern and ranges from a creamy color to a dark grayish-brown to a yellow brown. Males and females can be told apart because males have shorter and more robust teeth while females have slender teeth, and more teeth.

== Habitat ==
Neoplecostomus altimontanus lives in two streams (tributaries of the Rio Capivari) within the Rio Capivari drainage on the northern slope of Serra da Mantiqueira, in southeastern Brazil. The two streams are located in the Rio Capivari within the Rio Verde microbasin, affluent to Rio Sapucaí, Rio Grande sub-basin, upper Rio Paraná basin. The streams are cold and clear elevated between about 4,200 to 4,900 feet. The more fish were found in the places with higher water flow with small waterfalls.

== Discoverers ==
It says in the last paragraph of the Miami Herald article about the fish that the team of researchers who found the species are P. L. C. Uzeda, I. Paiola, P. S. Cesar, V. K. N. Okubo, W. J. Marques-Frisoni, B. N. Andrade, and F. Langeani.

== Etymology ==
The specific name altimontanus is a Latin phrase meaning "inhabitant of high mountains" which makes sense considering they live high up, about 4,200-4,900 feet high. It tells us this information in the 9th paragraph of the Miami Herald article of the fish.
