= Neoplecostomus watersi =

Conservation status
- Critically Endangered (IUCN 3.1)

Scientific classification
- Kingdom: Animalia
- Phylum: Chordata
- Class: Actinopterygii
- Order: Siluriformes
- Family: Loricariidae
- Genus: Neoplecostomus
- Species: N. watersi

Binomial name
- Neoplecostomus watersi G. S. C. Silva, Reia, Zawadzki & Roxo, 2019

Species of catfish

Neoplecostomus watersi is a species of freshwater ray-finned fish belonging to the family Loricariidae, the suckermouth armoured catfishes, and the subfamily Hypoptopomatinae, the cascudinhos. This catfish is endemic to Brazil.

== Taxonomy ==
Neoplecostomus watersi was first formally described in 2019 by the ichthyologists Gabriel de Souza da Costa e Silva, Lais Reia, Cláudio Henrique Zawadzki and Fábio Fernandes Roxo with its type locality given as the Cachoeira Creek in the Corrente River drainage, upper Paraná River basin, municipality of Aporé in the Brazilian state of Goiás at 18°3450.8"S, 52°05'52.8"W.. Eschmeyer's Catalog of Fishes classifies the genus Neoplecostomus in the subfamily Hypoptopomatinae, the cascudinhos, within the suckermouth armored catfish family Loricariidae.

== Etymology ==
Neoplecostomus watersi is classified within the genus Neoplecostomus, this name prefixes neo-, for "new" onto plecostomus, as this genus was proposed as a subgenus of Plecostomus, now known as Hypostomus and classified in the subfamily Hypostominae. The specific name, honours George Roger Waters, the English musician, singer and songwriter and member of Pink Floyd in recognition of his talent as a musician and for his social concerns, especially his interest in Brazilian economic social and political issues .

== Description ==
Neoplecostomus watersi has seven soft rays in its dorsal fin and five soft rays in its anal fin. This catfish has no adipose fin or unpaired plates at the location of the adipose fin. The caudal fin is dark with a hyaline vertical chevron. The lower lip extends nearly as far as the gill opening. This reaches a standard length of 7 cm (2.8 in).

== Distribution and habitat ==
Neoplecostomus doceensis is endemic to Brazil, where it is known only from its type locality, the Cachoeira Creek, a tributary of teh Corrente River in Goias. It is found in clear waters on the bottom underneath and between rocks.

== Conservation status ==
Neoplecostomus doceensis is known only from one stream and its habitat is threatened with degradation by agriculture and cattle ranching. The International Union for Conservation of Nature classify this catfish as Critically Endangered.
