= Harttia rhombocephala =

Conservation status
- Data Deficient (IUCN 3.1)

Scientific classification
- Kingdom: Animalia
- Phylum: Chordata
- Class: Actinopterygii
- Order: Siluriformes
- Family: Loricariidae
- Genus: Harttia
- Species: H. rhombocephala

Binomial name
- Harttia rhombocephala P. Miranda-Ribeiro, 1939

Species of fish

Harttia rhombocephala is a species of freshwater ray-finned fish belonging to the family Loricariidae, the suckermouth armored catfishes, and the subfamily Loricariinae, the mailed catfishes. This catfish is endemic to Brazil, where it is known only from the type locality, the Farias River, a small drainage that flows into Guanabara Bay in Rio de Janeiro State. The holotype is missing so this may not be a valid species, although Eschmeyer's Catalog of Fishes recognizes it as vaild.
