= Neoplecostomus granosus =

Conservation status
- Least Concern (IUCN 3.1)

Scientific classification
- Kingdom: Animalia
- Phylum: Chordata
- Class: Actinopterygii
- Division: Teleostei
- Order: Siluriformes
- Family: Loricariidae
- Genus: Neoplecostomus
- Species: N. granosus

Binomial name
- Neoplecostomus granosus (Valenciennes, 1840)

Synonyms
- Hypostomus granosus Valenciennes, 1840

Species of fish

Neoplecostomus granosus is a species of freshwater ray-finned fish belonging to the family Loricariidae, the suckermouth armoured catfishes, and the subfamily Hypoptopomatinae, the cascudinhos. This catfish is endemic to Brazil.

== Taxonomy ==
Neoplecostomus granosus was first formally described as Hypostomus granosus in 1840 by the French zoologist Achille Valenciennes, with its type locality given as Cayenne, French Guiana or Rio de Janeiro, Brazil. Eschmeyer's Catalog of Fishes classifies the genus Neoplecostomus in the subfamily Hypoptopomatinae, the cascudinhos, within the suckermouth armored catfish family Loricariidae.

== Etymology ==
Neoplecostomus granosus is classified within the genus Neoplecostomus. This name prefixes neo-, for "new", onto plecostomus, as this genus was proposed as a subgenus of Plecostomus, now known as Hypostomus and classified in the subfamily Hypostominae. The specific name, granosus, is Latin for "full of grains", an allusion to the granular texture of the underside of the body.

== Description ==
Neoplecostomus granosus reaches a standard length of 8.6 cm (3.4 in). Valenciennes described the ventral surface as having "fleshy granulations".

== Distribution ==
Neoplecostomus granosus is endemic to Brazil, where it occurs in the southeast, being found in the Paraíba do Sul River basin, in the states of São Paulo and Rio de Janeiro, and in the coastal rivers of the states of Rio de Janeiro and Espírito Santo up to the Itapemirim river drainage, in the states of Minas Gerais and Espírito Santo.

== Conservation status ==
Little is known about its biology and ecology of Neoplecostomus granosus. However, the International Union for Conservation of Nature state that there is little risk of extinction for this species, despite habitat loss, and they classify it as Least Concern.
