= Harttia surinamensis =

Conservation status
- Least Concern (IUCN 3.1)

Scientific classification
- Kingdom: Animalia
- Phylum: Chordata
- Class: Actinopterygii
- Order: Siluriformes
- Family: Loricariidae
- Genus: Harttia
- Species: H. surinamensis

Binomial name
- Harttia surinamensis Boeseman, 1971

Species of fish

Harttia surinamensis is a species of freshwater ray-finned fish belonging to the family Loricariidae, the suckermouth armored catfishes, and the subfamily Loricariinae, the mailed catfishes. This catfish is found in the Coppename, Suriname, Cottica, Commewijne, Maroni, Mana, Sinnamary, Comté, Approuague, Ouanary and Oiapoque rivers in Suriname and French Guiana. This species grows to a standard length of 18.8 cm (7.4 in). Adult males have very well developed odontodes on the front edges of their pectoral fins.
