= Harttia longipinna =

Conservation status
- Least Concern (IUCN 3.1)

Scientific classification
- Kingdom: Animalia
- Phylum: Chordata
- Class: Actinopterygii
- Order: Siluriformes
- Family: Loricariidae
- Genus: Harttia
- Species: H. longipinna

Binomial name
- Harttia longipinna Langeani, Oyakawa & Montoya-Burgos, 2001

Species of fish

Harttia longipinna is a species of freshwater ray-finned fish belonging to the family Loricariidae, the suckermouth armored catfishes, and the subfamily Loricariinae, the mailed catfishes. This catfish is endemic to Brazil, where it is found in the upper and middle São Francisco River basin in the states of Bahia and Minas Gerais. This species grows to a standard length of 5.7 cm (2.2 in)..
