= Harttia punctata =

Conservation status
- Least Concern (IUCN 3.1)

Scientific classification
- Kingdom: Animalia
- Phylum: Chordata
- Class: Actinopterygii
- Order: Siluriformes
- Family: Loricariidae
- Genus: Harttia
- Species: H. punctata

Binomial name
- Harttia punctata Rapp Py-Daniel & E. C. de Oliveira, 2001

Species found in Brazil

Harttia punctata is a species of freshwater ray-finned fish belonging to the family Loricariidae, the suckermouth armored catfishes, and the subfamily Loricariinae, the mailed catfishes. This catfish is endemic to Brazil, where it is found in the Tocantins and Araguaia rivers in the states of Goiás, Pará and Tocantins. This species grows to a standard length of 16.6 cm (6.5 in).
