= Harttia garavelloi =

Conservation status
- Least Concern (IUCN 3.1)

Scientific classification
- Kingdom: Animalia
- Phylum: Chordata
- Class: Actinopterygii
- Order: Siluriformes
- Family: Loricariidae
- Genus: Harttia
- Species: H. garavelloi

Binomial name
- Harttia garavelloi Oyakawa, 1993

Species of fish

Harttia garavelloi s a species of freshwater ray-finned fish belonging to the family Loricariidae, the suckermouth armored catfishes, and the subfamily Loricariinae, the mailed catfishes. This catfish is endemic to Brazil where it is found in the Fanado and Araçuaí rivers in Minas Gerais and Bahia. This species grows to a standard length of 8.6 cm (3.4 in).

Harttia garavelloi has a specific name which honors the ichthyologist Julio C. Garavello, of the Universidade Federale de São Carlos, because of his work on neotropical freshwater fishes and for providing the paratypes for description.
