= Caura River (Venezuela) =

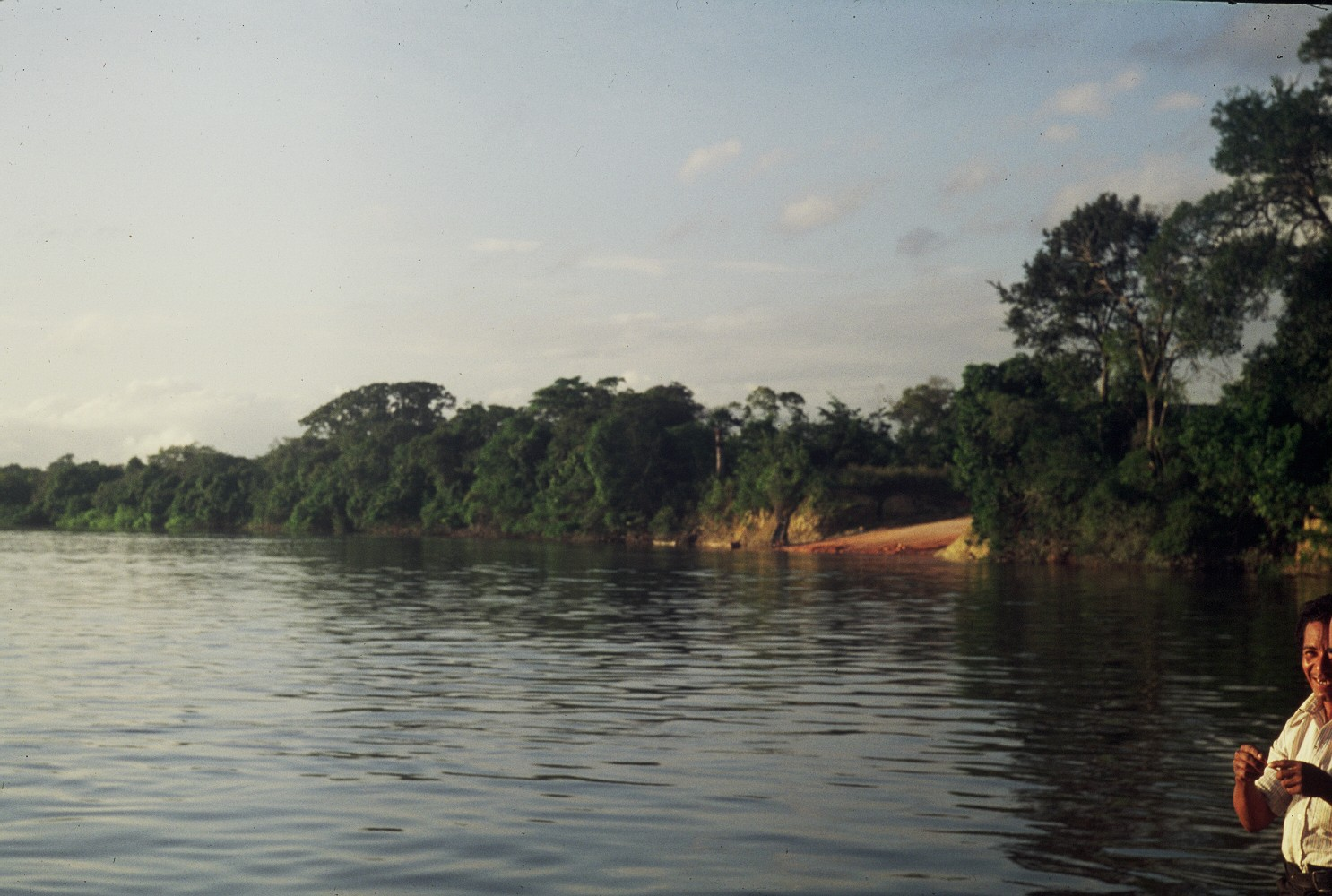
- Caura River near Maripa, where a ferry crosses it (December 1979)

- Mouth location in Venezuela
- Native name: Rio Caura (Spanish)

Location
- Country: Venezuela

Physical characteristics
- Mouth
  - location: Orinoco
  - coordinates: 7°37′44″N 64°53′52″W
  - elevation: 14 m (46 ft)
- Length: 723 km (449 mi)
- Basin size: 52,000 km^{2} (20,000 sq mi)
- Discharge
  - average: 3,544 m^{3}/s (125,200 cu ft/s)

Basin features
- River system: Orinoco

The Caura, is a tributary of the Orinoco River, located in Bolívar State in Venezuela. Its flow is the second after the Caroni River among the affluents of the Orinoco River, with almost 3,544 cubic metres per second (125,200 cu ft/s). The river is inhabited by both the Ye'kuana and Sanema indigenous groups.

== Basin ==
The river drains the Guayanan Highlands moist forests ecoregion. The Caura River is about 723 kilometres (449 mi) long. Its major tributary is the Erebato. Both rivers emerge from the Jaua-Sarisariñama Plateau, more than 2,000 metres (6,600 ft) above sea level). The Caura is navigable up to Pará Falls (Salto Pará), an impressive waterfall formed by two branches of the river with an island in the middle 6.310521°N 64.523735°W Both branches have some rapids and join in one of the most remarkable waterfalls in the Orinoco basin, not because of its height, but because of the impressive flow of water. The Caura is a blackwater river, like the Caroní, the Ventuari River and the upper Orinoco. The Caura is 1,500 metres (4,900 ft) wide at Musinacio (Musiú Ignacio), the point where it joins the Orinoco, 5.6 kilometres (3.5 mi) wide at this point.

== Microclimate ==
Satellite images in the Intertropical Zone show an interesting lack of clouds above the biggest rivers, such as the Caura and Orinoco, and also in the Amazon river. We need to take into account two facts:

- Satellite images, like aerial ones, are taken in the morning, when there are fewer clouds in the atmosphere.
- Sunshine heats up both water in rivers and land surface. However, water needs much more time to heating up than land does and atmosphere air is not heated by solar rays because it is diathermanous. It is heat coming up from soil and river waters, which in turn heat up the atmosphere. Therefore, difference of temperature between land and rivers is at its maximum at 10 a.m. (more or less). At that time, the land surface reflects heat to the atmosphere, making air ascend and condense, forming clouds, while water is still heating up and, thus, there is not outcoming heat to the atmosphere.

== Fish in river ==
This is a partial list of fish found in the Caura River in Venezuela.

- Harttia merevari
