= Neoplecostomus langeanii =

Conservation status
- Data Deficient (IUCN 3.1)

Scientific classification
- Kingdom: Animalia
- Phylum: Chordata
- Class: Actinopterygii
- Division: Teleostei
- Order: Siluriformes
- Family: Loricariidae
- Genus: Neoplecostomus
- Species: N. langeanii

Binomial name
- Neoplecostomus langeanii Roxo, Oliveira & Zawadzki, 2012

Species of catfish

Neoplecostomus langeanii is a species of freshwater ray-finned fish belonging to the family Loricariidae, the suckermouth armoured catfishes, and the subfamily Hypoptopomatinae, the cascudinhos. This catfish is endemic to Brazil.

== Taxonomy ==
Neoplecostomus langeanii was first formally described in 2012 by the ichthyologists Fábio Fernandes Roxo, Claudio de Oliveira and Cláudio Henrique Zawadzki, with its type locality given as the São Domingos River, a tributary of Muzambinho River, in the Rio Grande basin, at 21°23'22"S, 46°28'40"W, municipality of Muzambinho, in the Brazilian state of Minas Gerais. Eschmeyer's Catalog of Fishes classifies the genus Neoplecostomus in the subfamily Hypoptopomatinae, the cascudinhos, within the suckermouth armored catfish family Loricariidae.

== Etymology ==
Neoplecostomus langeanii is classified within the genus Neoplecostomus. This name prefixes neo-, for "new", onto plecostomus, as this genus was proposed as a subgenus of Plecostomus, now known as Hypostomus and classified in the subfamily Hypostominae. The specific name honours the Brazilian ichthyologist Francisco Langeani-Neto in recognition of his contributions to the ichthyology of the Neotropics.

== Description ==
Neoplecostomus langeanii does not have keels on the plates in the lateral series of plates. It has a well-developed adipose fin. There are five distinct black bands on the back, but no clear spots. This species does not show hypertrophied odontodes, and the skin on the head is swollen along the sides of the head and on the ridges in front of the eyes. This catfish has an elongated body shape, and reaches a standard length of 8.6 cm (3.4 in).

== Distribution ==
Neoplecostomus langeanii is endemic to Brazil, where it is only known from the drainage of the Muzambinho River in Muzambinho, Minas Gerais.

== Conservation status ==
Neoplecostomus langeanii is a recently described species and there is minimal data on its distribution, population size, threats and biology. The International Union for Conservation of Nature have, therefore, classified this species as Data Deficient.
