= Neoplecostomus bandeirante =

Conservation status
- Least Concern (IUCN 3.1)

Scientific classification
- Kingdom: Animalia
- Phylum: Chordata
- Class: Actinopterygii
- Order: Siluriformes
- Family: Loricariidae
- Genus: Neoplecostomus
- Species: N. bandeirante

Binomial name
- Neoplecostomus bandeirante Roxo, Oliveira & Zawadzki, 2012

Species of catfish

Neoplecostomus bandeirante is a species of freshwater ray-finned fish belonging to the family Loricariidae, the suckermouth armoured catfishes, and the subfamily Hypoptopomatinae, the cascudinhos. This catfish is endemic to Brazil.

== Taxonomy ==
Neoplecostomus bandeirante was first formally described in 2012 by the ichthyologists Fábio Fernandes Roxo, Claudio de Oliveira and Cláudio Henrique Zawadzki with its type locality given as the Paraitinga River, Tietê River basin, at 23°31'25"S, 43°53'22"W, in the municipality of Salesópolis in the Brazilian state of São Paulo. Eschmeyer's Catalog of Fishes classifies the genus Neoplecostomus in the subfamily Hypoptopomatinae, the cascudinhos, within the suckermouth armored catfish family Loricariidae.

== Etymology ==
Neoplecostomus bandeirante is classified within the genus Neoplecostomus, this name prefixes neo-, for "new" onto plecostomus, as this genus was proposed as a subgenus of Plecostomus, now known as Hypostomus and classified in the subfamily Hypostominae. The specific name, bandeirante, is derived from the bandeirantes, "flag-bearer" in Portuguese, the frontiersmen, explorers, settlers, slavers and prospectors in early colonial Brazil who expanded Portuguese rule over the country.

== Description ==
Neoplecostomus bandeirante can be told apart from all the other species in its genus by having keels on each series of plates on its flanks. The dorsal fin is supported by a single spine and 7 soft rays while the anal fin contains 6 soft rays. This species has a elongate body shape and it reaches a standard length of 11 cm (4.3 in).

== Distribution ==
Neoplecostomus bandeirante is endemic to Brazil where it know only from its type locality. Neoplecostomus catfishes occur in shallow freshwater habitats, normally less than 1 m (3 ft 3 in) in depth, with rocky bottoms and fast currents. These are usually the headwater streams of river systems.
