= Harttia absaberi =

Conservation status
- Least Concern (IUCN 3.1)

Scientific classification
- Kingdom: Animalia
- Phylum: Chordata
- Class: Actinopterygii
- Order: Siluriformes
- Family: Loricariidae
- Genus: Harttia
- Species: H. absaberi

Binomial name
- Harttia absaberi Oyakawa, Fichberg & Langeani, 2013

Species of fish

Harttia absaberi is a species of freshwater ray-finned fish belonging to the family Loricariidae, the suckermouth armored catfishes, and the subfamily Loricariinae, the mailed catfishes. This catfish is endemic to Brazil where it is known from two locations in the upper Paraná River basin; the Passa Cinco River, a tributary of the Piracicaba River in the Tietê River drainage in São Paulo state, and from two small tributaries of the Sucuriú River in Três Lagoas in Mato Grosso do Sul. It has apparently been extirpated from São Paulo but there have been more recent records from Mato Grosso do Sul. This species reaches a maximum standard length of 7.4 cm (2.9 in).

Harttia absaberi was first formally described in 2013 by Osvaldo takeshi Oyakawa, Ilana Fichberg and Francisco Langeani with its type locality given as ribeirão São Mateus, tributary of the rio Sucuriú near Três Lagoas in the Rio Paraná basin of Mato Grosso do Sul. The specific name, absaberi, honors the Brazilian geographer Aziz Nacib Ab’Sáber, recognizing his contributions to the fields of geography, ecology and geomorphology in Brazil.
