= Harttia uatumensis =

Conservation status
- Near Threatened (IUCN 3.1)

Scientific classification
- Kingdom: Animalia
- Phylum: Chordata
- Class: Actinopterygii
- Division: Teleostei
- Order: Siluriformes
- Family: Loricariidae
- Genus: Harttia
- Species: H. uatumensis

Binomial name
- Harttia uatumensis Rapp Py-Daniel & E. C. de Oliveira, 2001

Species of ray-finned fish

Harttia uatumensis is a species of freshwater ray-finned fish belonging to the family Loricariidae, the suckermouth armored catfishes, and the subfamily Loricariinae, the mailed catfishes. This catfish is endemic to Brazil where it is found in the basin of the Uatumã River in the state of Amazonas. This species grows to a standard length of 11.9 cm (4.7 in).
