= Harttia kronei =

Conservation status
- Least Concern (IUCN 3.1)

Scientific classification
- Kingdom: Animalia
- Phylum: Chordata
- Class: Actinopterygii
- Order: Siluriformes
- Family: Loricariidae
- Genus: Harttia
- Species: H. kronei

Binomial name
- Harttia kronei A. Miranda-Ribeiro, 1908

Species of fish

Harttia kronei is a species of freshwater ray-finned fish belonging to the family Loricariidae, the suckermouth armored catfishes, and the subfamily Loricariinae, the mailed catfishes. This catfish is endemic to Brazil where it is found in the Ribeira de Iguape and Paranapanema river basins in the states of Paraná and São Paulo. This species grows to a standard length of 12 cm (4.7 in).

Harttia kronei s a specific name which honors its discoverer, naturalist-archaeologist Ricardo Krone.
