= Neoplecostomus espiritosantensis =

Conservation status
- Near Threatened (IUCN 3.1)

Scientific classification
- Kingdom: Animalia
- Phylum: Chordata
- Class: Actinopterygii
- Order: Siluriformes
- Family: Loricariidae
- Genus: Neoplecostomus
- Species: N. espiritosantensis

Binomial name
- Neoplecostomus espiritosantensis Langeani, 1990

Species of fish

Neoplecostomus espiritosantensis is a species of freshwater ray-finned fish belonging to the family Loricariidae, the suckermouth armoured catfishes, and the subfamily Hypoptopomatinae, the cascudinhos. This catfish is endemic to Brazil.

== Taxonomy ==
Neoplecostomus espiritosantensis was first formally described in 1990 by the ichthyologist Francisco Langeani-Neto with its type locality given as the south branch of the Jucu River at Vitor Hugo, Municipality of Domingos Martins in the Brazilian state of Espirito Santo. Eschmeyer's Catalog of Fishes classifies the genus Neoplecostomus in the subfamily Hypoptopomatinae, the cascudinhos, within the suckermouth armored catfish family Loricariidae.

== Etymology ==
Neoplecostomus espiritosantensis is classified within the genus Neoplecostomus, this name prefixes neo-, for "new" onto plecostomus, as this genus was proposed as a subgenus of Plecostomus, now known as Hypostomus and classified in the subfamily Hypostominae. The specific name, espiritosantensis, refers to the state, Espirito Santo, in which the type locality, Vitor Hugo in the Municipality of Domingos Martins.

== Description ==
Neoplecostomus espiritosantensis reaches a standard length of 10.3 cm (4.1 in).

== Distribution ==
Neoplecostomus espiritosantensis is endemic to Brazil where it occurs in the Piraquêaçu and Jucu river basins on the eastern slope of the Serra do Mar in the state of Espirito Santo. It has also been recorded in the headwaters of the Tumbui River in the Reis Magos River in Espririto Santo.

== Conservation status ==
Neoplecostomus espiritosantensis requires clear fast flowing waters and is threatened by pollution from pesticides, poultry farming, deforestation and silting up of rivers. This catfish has restricted range and a number of threats to its population have been identified and the International Union for Conservation of Nature has classified it as Near Threatened, approaching Endangered.
