= Harttia canastra =

Scientific classification
- Kingdom: Animalia
- Phylum: Chordata
- Class: Actinopterygii
- Order: Siluriformes
- Family: Loricariidae
- Genus: Harttia
- Species: H. canastra

Binomial name
- Harttia canastra Caldas, Cherobim & Langeani, 2022

Species of catfish

Harttia canastra is a species of freshwater ray-finned fish belonging to the family Loricariidae, the suckermouth armored catfishes, and the subfamily Loricariinae, the mailed catfishes. This catfish is known only from the São Francisco River basin in Brazil. It occurs in clear, fast-flowing headwater streams near Serra da Canastra National Park, where it occupies riffles with sandy and rocky substrates, dissolved-oxygen levels from 8.9 to 21.7 mg/L, and water temperatures between 12 and 23 °C. The species reaches at least 10.9 cm (4.3 inches) in standard length. It was described in 2022 by Laís Caldas, Arieli M. Cherobim, and Francisco Langeani of São Paulo State University on the basis of its distinctive morphology.
