= Harttia depressa =

Conservation status
- Endangered (IUCN 3.1)

Scientific classification
- Kingdom: Animalia
- Phylum: Chordata
- Class: Actinopterygii
- Order: Siluriformes
- Family: Loricariidae
- Genus: Harttia
- Species: H. depressa

Binomial name
- Harttia depressa Rapp Py-Daniel & E. C. de Oliveira, 2001

Species of fish

Harttia depressa is a species of freshwater ray-finned fish belonging to the family Loricariidae, the suckermouth armored catfishes, and the subfamily Loricariinae, the mailed catfishes. This catfish is endemic to Brazil where it is restricted to the Uatumã River in Amazonas. Two dams, the Paranapanema and the Balbina dams, have been constructed close to the type locality of this species and have caused the disappearance of the rapids where this catfish was found. There have been no records of this species since those dams were constructed. This species attains a maximum standard length of 12.6 cm (5.0 in).
