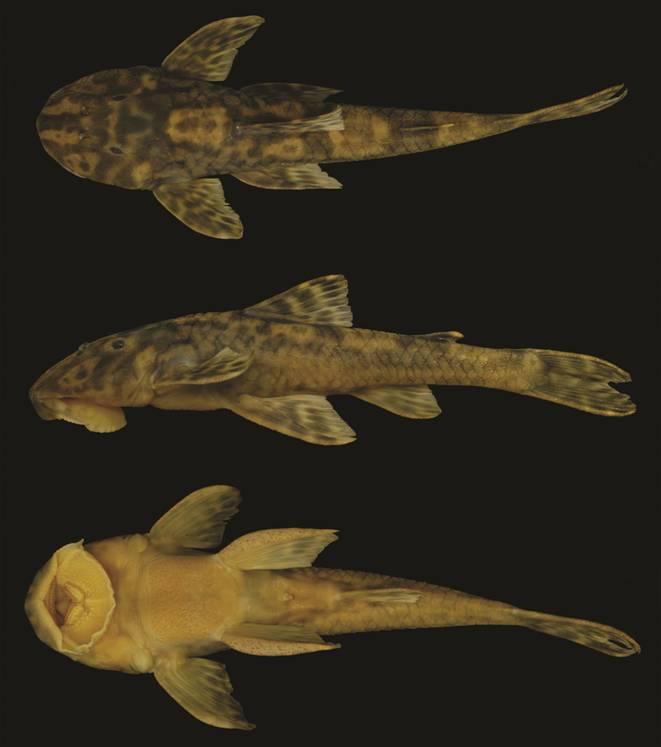
- Holotype (82.2 mm SL)

Scientific classification
- Kingdom: Animalia
- Phylum: Chordata
- Class: Actinopterygii
- Division: Teleostei
- Order: Siluriformes
- Family: Loricariidae
- Genus: Neoplecostomus
- Species: N. paraty

Binomial name
- Neoplecostomus paraty Cherobim, Lazzarotto & Langeani, 2017

= Neoplecostomus paraty =

Species of catfish

Neoplecostomus paraty is a species of freshwater ray-finned fish belonging to the family Loricariidae, the suckermouth armoured catfishes, and the subfamily Hypoptopomatinae, the cascudinhos. This catfish is endemic to Brazil.

== Taxonomy ==
Neoplecostomus paraty was first formally described in 2017 by the Brazilian ichthyologists Arieli Matheus Cherobim, Henrique Lazzarotto and Francisco Langeani-Neto with its type locality given as a coastal drainage, a tributary of the Perequê-Açú, a stream on the road between Parati and Cunha, in the Serra da Bocaina National Park, in the Parati Municipality, in the Brazilian state of Rio de Janeiro st 23°11'54"S, 44°49'48"W, from an elevation of 378 m (1,240 ft). Eschmeyer's Catalog of Fishes classifies the genus Neoplecostomus in the subfamily Hypoptopomatinae, the cascudinhos, within the suckermouth armored catfish family Loricariidae.

== Etymology ==
Neoplecostomus paraty is classified within the genus Neoplecostomus, this name prefixes neo-, for "new" onto plecostomus, as this genus was proposed as a subgenus of Plecostomus, now known as Hypostomus and classified in the subfamily Hypostominae. The specific name, paraty, the original spelling of the municipality of Parati, where this species occurs in four coastal drainages. The name parati is from Tupí, parat, a mullet, combined with i, "river".

== Description ==
Neoplecostomus paraty has a distinctive colour pattern on its upper surface made up of an obvious horseshoe shaped pale blotch surrounded a pale area to te rear of the supraoccipital. There are also skeletal characteristics that can be used to separate this species from other species in its genus. This catfish reaches a standard length of 92 mm (3.6 in).

== Distribution ==
Neoplecostomus paraty is endemic to Brazil where it is known from four small coastal drainages, draining from the Serra do Bocaina in the municipality of Parati in the state of Rio de Janeiro.
