= Harttia trombetensis =

Conservation status
- Least Concern (IUCN 3.1)

Scientific classification
- Kingdom: Animalia
- Phylum: Chordata
- Class: Actinopterygii
- Order: Siluriformes
- Family: Loricariidae
- Genus: Harttia
- Species: H. trombetensis

Binomial name
- Harttia trombetensis Rapp Py-Daniel & E. C. de Oliveira, 2001

Species of fish

Harttia trombetensis is a species of freshwater ray-finned fish belonging to the family Loricariidae, the suckermouth armored catfishes, and the subfamily Loricariinae, the mailed catfishes. This catfish is endemic to Brazil where it occurs in the Trombetas River in the state of Pará. This species reaches a maximum standard length of 17.6 cm (6.9 in).
