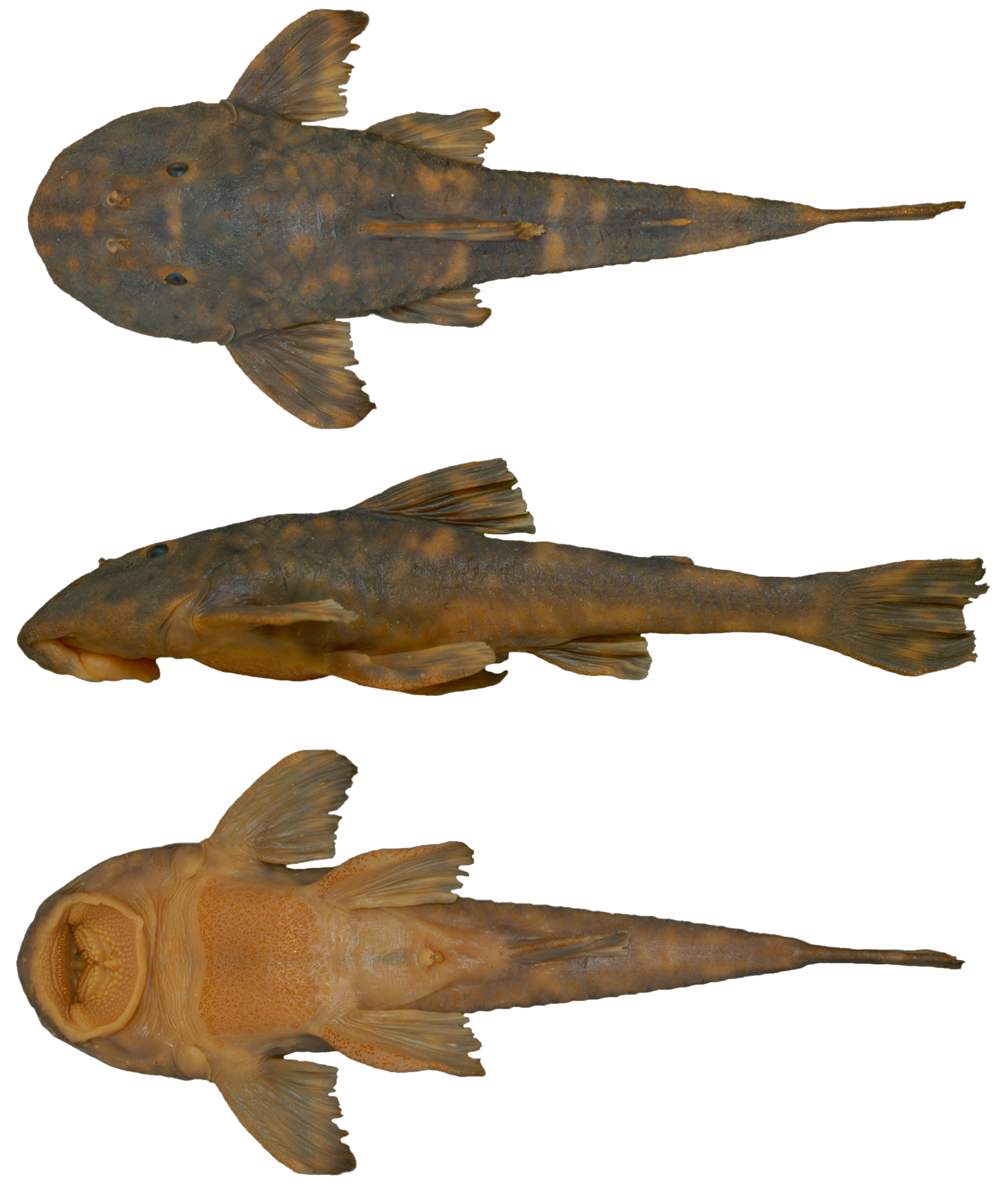
- Dorsal, lateral and ventral views

Scientific classification
- Kingdom: Animalia
- Phylum: Chordata
- Class: Actinopterygii
- Division: Teleostei
- Order: Siluriformes
- Family: Loricariidae
- Genus: Neoplecostomus
- Species: N. sapucai

Binomial name
- Neoplecostomus sapucai Andrade, Uzeda, Paiola, Siqueira-Cesar, Okubo, Marques-Frisoni & Langeani, 2024

= Neoplecostomus sapucai =

Species of catfish

Neoplecostomus sapucai is a species of freshwater ray-finned fish belonging to the family Loricariidae, the suckermouth armoured catfishes, and the subfamily Hypoptopomatinae, the cascudinhos. This catfish is endemic to Brazil.

== Taxonomy ==
Neoplecostomus sapucai was first formally described in 2024 by Andrade et al, with its type locality given as an unnamed stream on the Highway AMG-1915, between Piquete and Delfim Moreira in the Sapucai River, in the Rio Grande basin, at Delfim Moreira in the Brazilian state of Minas Gerais at 22°32'31.3"S, 45°14'28.8"W, from an elevation of 1.331 m (4 ft 4.4 in). Eschmeyer's Catalog of Fishes classifies the genus Neoplecostomus in the subfamily Hypoptopomatinae, the cascudinhos, within the suckermouth armored catfish family Loricariidae.

== Etymology ==
Neoplecostomus sapucai is classified within the genus Neoplecostomus. This name prefixes neo-, for "new", onto plecostomus, as this genus was proposed as a subgenus of Plecostomus, now known as Hypostomus and classified in the subfamily Hypostominae. The specific name, sapucai, is the name of the river in Minas Gerais and São Paulo where this fish occurs.

== Distribution ==
Neoplecostomus sapucai endemic to Brazil, where it is found in eight streams in the Sapucaí River drainage in the states of Minas Gerais and São Paulo.

== Description ==
Neoplecostomus sapucai can reach a standard length of 8.8 cm (3.5 in) and has an elongated body covered in bony plates. They have a broad head, bumpy lips, and copper colored teeth. It is golden yellow and brown, and has blotches of color on its sides and fins.

== Sexual dimorphism ==
Neoplecostomus sapucai males have shorter and robust teeth, while females have more slender teeth.

== Habitat ==
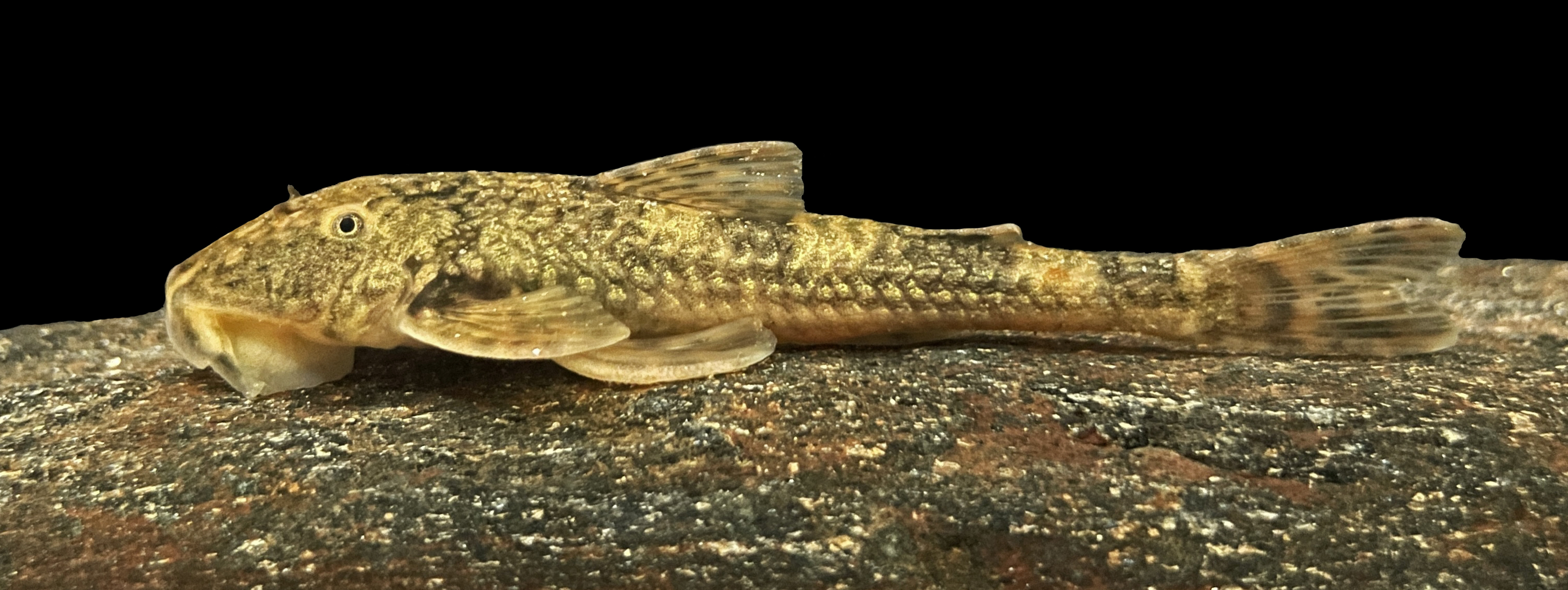
A live male specimen

Neoplecostomus sapucai live in stony, shallow streams that have crystal clear water and rapid flow. The species was found living near manmade things like highways or pastures, showing that humans do not pose that much of a threat to the species. The species is found in 16 different sites within the Sapucaí River drainage.

== Etymology ==
The researchers who found Neoplecostomus sapucai said they named it after the Sapucaí River, where the species was found.
