= Harttia fowleri =

Conservation status
- Least Concern (IUCN 3.1)

Scientific classification
- Kingdom: Animalia
- Phylum: Chordata
- Class: Actinopterygii
- Order: Siluriformes
- Family: Loricariidae
- Genus: Harttia
- Species: H. fowleri

Binomial name
- Harttia fowleri (Pellegrin, 1908)

Synonyms
- Oxyloricaria fowleri Pellegrin, 1908; Cteniloricaria fowleri (Pellegrin, 1908)

Species of fish

Harttia fowleri is a species of freshwater ray-finned fish belonging to the family Loricariidae, the suckermouth armored catfishes, and the subfamily Loricariinae, the mailed catfishes. This catfish is endemic to the Oyapock River basin of Amapá, Brazil, and French Guiana. H. fowleri is a poorly known species that was caught in rapids along with Metaloricaria paucidens. This species grows to a standard length of 22.2 cm (8.7 in).

Harttia fowleri has a specific name which honors the American ichthyologist Henry Weed Fowler, of the Academy of Natural Sciences of Philadelphia.
