= Harttia duriventris =

Conservation status
- Least Concern (IUCN 3.1)

Scientific classification
- Kingdom: Animalia
- Phylum: Chordata
- Class: Actinopterygii
- Order: Siluriformes
- Family: Loricariidae
- Genus: Harttia
- Species: H. duriventris

Binomial name
- Harttia duriventris Rapp Py-Daniel & E. C. de Oliveira, 2001

Species of fish

Harttia duriventris is a species of freshwater ray-finned fish belonging to the family Loricariidae, the suckermouth armored catfishes, and the subfamily Loricariinae, the mailed catfishes. This catfish is endemic to Brazil where it is found in the states of Pará and Tocantins. This species attains a maximum standard length of 12.8 cm (5.0 in).
