= Harttia =

- Harttia loricariformis

Scientific classification
- Kingdom: Animalia
- Phylum: Chordata
- Class: Actinopterygii
- Order: Siluriformes
- Family: Loricariidae
- Subfamily: Loricariinae
- Genus: Harttia; Steindachner, 1877

Type species
- Harttia loricariformis Steindachner, 1877

Synonyms
- Quiritixys Isbrücker, 2001

Genus of catfishes

Harttia is a genus of freshwater ray-finned fish is a species of freshwater ray-finned fishes belonging to the family Loricariidae, the suckermouth armored catfishes, and the subfamily Loricariinae, the mailed catfishes. The species in this genus are founsd in South America.

== Etymology ==
The genus name comes from Charles Frederick Hartt, a geologist, paleontologist and naturalist, who collected the many specimens during the Thayer Expedition to Brazil in the years 1865–1866.

== Taxonomy ==
As of 1997, Harttia was considered a monophyletic taxon. However, Harttia is in need of revision. For example, the synonymy of Cteniloricaria with Harttia was questionable because it rested solely on the characteristics of Harttia fowleri without considering the type species of Cteniloricaria.

== Species ==
Harttia contains the following recognized species:

- Harttia absaberi Oyakawa, Fichberg & Langeani, 2013
- Harttia canastra Caldas, Cherobim & Langeani, 2022
- Harttia carvalhoi P. Miranda-Ribeiro, 1939
- Harttia depressa Rapp Py-Daniel & E. C. Oliveira, 2001
- Harttia dissidens Rapp Py-Daniel & E. C. Oliveira, 2001
- Harttia duriventris Rapp Py-Daniel & E. C. Oliveira, 2001
- Harttia fluminensis Covain & Fisch-Muller, 2012
- Harttia fowleri (Pellegrin, 1908)
- Harttia garavelloi Oyakawa, 1993
- Harttia gracilis Oyakawa, 1993
- Harttia guianensis Rapp Py-Daniel & E. C. Oliveira, 2001
- Harttia intermontana J. C. Oliveira & Oyakawa, 2019
- Harttia kronei A. Miranda-Ribeiro, 1908
- Harttia leiopleura Oyakawa, 1993
- Harttia longipinna Langeani, Oyakawa & Montoya-Burgos, 2001
- Harttia loricariformis Steindachner, 1877
- Harttia merevari Provenzano, Machado-Allison, Chernoff, Willink & Petry, 2005
- Harttia novalimensis Oyakawa 1993
- Harttia panara Oyakawa, Fichberg & Rapp Py-Daniel, 2018
- Harttia punctata Rapp Py-Daniel & E. C. Oliveira, 2001
- Harttia rhombocephala P. Miranda Ribeiro, 1939
- Harttia rondoni Oyakawa, Fichberg & Rapp Py-Daniel, 2018
- Harttia surinamensis Boeseman, 1971
- Harttia torrenticola Oyakawa, 1993
- Harttia trombetensis Rapp Py-Daniel & E. C. Oliveira, 2001
- Harttia tuna Covain & Fisch-Muller, 2012
- Harttia uatumensis Rapp Py-Daniel & E. C. Oliveira, 2001
- Harttia villasboas Oyakawa, Fichberg & Rapp Py-Daniel, 2018

== Distribution and habitat ==
Distribution of Harttia species primarily includes rivers draining the Guyana Shield, coastal rivers in northeastern Brazil, and the Amazon River basin. The greatest species diversity of Harttia, occurs in the Pre-Cambrian Brazilian Shield region. Only H. platystoma and H. merevari are known from Venezuela. These rheophilic fishes are found in the upper courses of rivers over rocky and sandy bottoms. Harttia species are thought to be able to exploit areas with the strongest current, because of its extremely depressed body and long caudal peduncle, comparing to other species.

== Description ==
Sexual dimorphism includes hypertrophied odontodes on the pectoral fin spines and along the margins of the snout in mature males.

Harttia exhibits considerable karyotypic diversity with chromosome numbers between 2n = 52 and 2n = 58 in the four species characterized.

== Ecology ==
Representatives of this genus seem to be open brooders.
