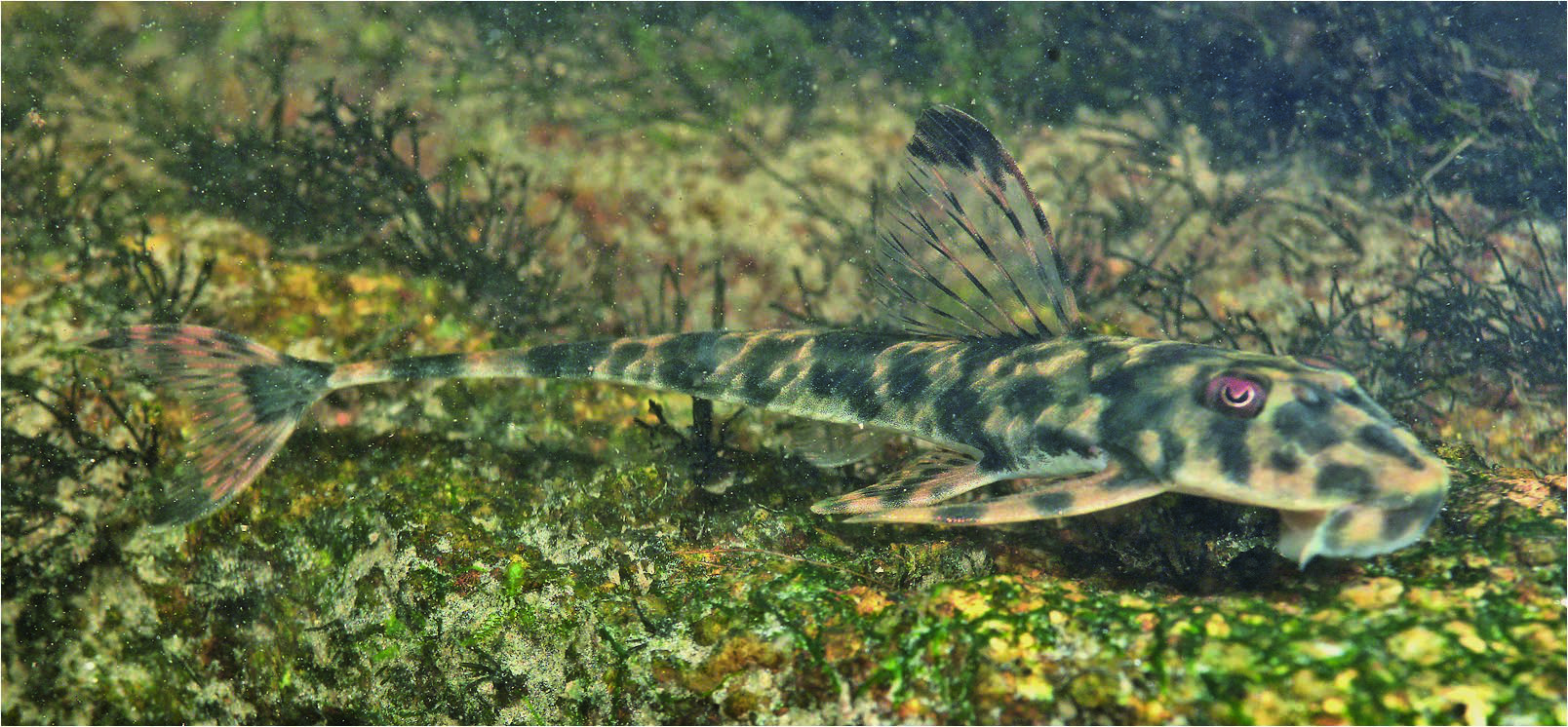

Conservation status
- Least Concern (IUCN 3.1)

Scientific classification
- Kingdom: Animalia
- Phylum: Chordata
- Class: Actinopterygii
- Order: Siluriformes
- Family: Loricariidae
- Genus: Harttia
- Species: H. guianensis

Binomial name
- Harttia guianensis Rapp Py-Daniel & E. C. de Oliveira, 2001

= Harttia guianensis =

Species of fish

Harttia guianensis is a species of freshwater ray-finned fish belonging to the family Loricariidae, the suckermouth armored catfishes, and the subfamily Loricariinae, the mailed catfishes. This catfish occurs in French Guiana and Suriname where it is found in the Maroni, Mana, Sinnamary and Approuague River basins. This species grows to a standard length of 17.5 cm (6.9 in).
