= Harttia fluminensis =

Conservation status
- Least Concern (IUCN 3.1)

Scientific classification
- Kingdom: Animalia
- Phylum: Chordata
- Class: Actinopterygii
- Order: Siluriformes
- Family: Loricariidae
- Genus: Harttia
- Species: H. fluminensis

Binomial name
- Harttia fluminensis Covain & Fisch-Muller, 2012

Species of catfish

Harttia fluminensis is a species of freshwater ray-finned fish belonging to the family Loricariidae, the suckermouth armored catfishes, and the subfamily Loricariinae, the mailed catfishes. This catfish is endemic to the Coppename River drainage in Suriname.

This species reaches a length of 15.1 cm (5.9 in). It occurs in the main channels of rivers over rocky and sant substrates.
