= Neoplecostomus doceensis =

Scientific classification
- Kingdom: Animalia
- Phylum: Chordata
- Class: Actinopterygii
- Order: Siluriformes
- Family: Loricariidae
- Genus: Neoplecostomus
- Species: N. doceensis

Binomial name
- Neoplecostomus doceensis Roxo, G. S. C. Silva, Zawadzki & Oliveira , 2014

Species of catfish

Neoplecostomus doceensis is a species of freshwater ray-finned fish belonging to the family Loricariidae, the suckermouth armoured catfishes, and the subfamily Hypoptopomatinae, the cascudinhos. This catfish is endemic to Brazil.

== Taxonomy ==
Neoplecostomus doceensis was first formally described in 2014 by the ichthyologists Fábio Fernandes Roxo, Gabriel de Souza da Costa e Silva, Cláudio Henrique Zawadzki and Claudio de Oliveira with its type locality given as the Bananeiras stream, a tributary of the Gualaxo do Norte River, in the Doce River basin in the Municipality of Ouro Preto, in the Brazilian state of Minas Gerais. Eschmeyer's Catalog of Fishes classifies the genus Neoplecostomus in the subfamily Hypoptopomatinae, the cascudinhos, within the suckermouth armored catfish family Loricariidae.

== Etymology ==
Neoplecostomus doceensis is classified within the genus Neoplecostomus, this name prefixes neo-, for "new" onto plecostomus, as this genus was proposed as a subgenus of Plecostomus, now known as Hypostomus and classified in the subfamily Hypostominae. The specific name, doceensis, refers to the type locality in the Doce River system of Minas Gerais.

== Description ==
Neoplecostomus doceensis has two spines and seven soft rays in its dorsal fin and five soft rays in its anal fin. It can be told from all other species in its genus by the presence of large folds of flesh between dentaries, more obvious in mature males than in females and immature males, and in having two or three series of well-developed papillae in front of the teeth on the premaxilla. This species has an elongated body shape and it reaches a standard length of 10.1 cm (4.0 in).

== Distribution and habitat ==
Neoplecostomus doceensis is endemic to Brazil, where it is found in the basin of the River Doce in Minas Gerais. It is found on the bottom in small to medium sized rivers with clear water with rocky outcrops forming waterfalls and where the streambed consists of rock and sand.
