= Charles Frederick Hartt =

Canadian-American geologist, paleontologist and naturalist (1840–1878)

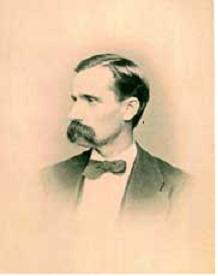
- Born: 23 August 1840; Fredericton, New Brunswick, British North America
- Died: 18 March 1878 (aged 37)

Charles Frederick Hartt (23 August 1840 in Fredericton, New Brunswick – 18 March 1878) was a Canadian-American geologist, paleontologist and naturalist who specialized in the geology of Brazil.

== Nova Scotia and New Brunswick ==
Hartt graduated from Acadia College in Wolfville, Nova Scotia, in 1860, and by his graduation he had made extensive geological explorations in Nova Scotia. In 1860, he accompanied his father, Jarvis William Hartt, to Saint John, New Brunswick, where they established a high school for young women in which Charles Frederick taught for a year. Hartt also studied the geology of New Brunswick, and devoted special attention to the Devonian shales, in which he discovered an abundance of land plants and insects.

== Exploration in Brazil ==
In 1861, Hartt started to work as a student assistant for Louis Agassiz at the Museum of Comparative Zoology, Harvard University. This work lasted until 1864, when he received an appointment on the geological survey of New Brunswick. In 1865 he accompanied Agassiz to Brazil in the Thayer Expedition.

Agassiz was mainly concerned with collecting fish on the expedition through the Amazonian basin. He also hypothesized that Brazil had also been affected by the Last Glacial Maximum (LGM), so supported field work to find evidence supporting glaciation, such as gravel beds. His close assistant Hartt instead found evidence that other factors such as organic decay caused specific features in the Brazilian landscape. In the 20th century, extensive field work by other scientists mapped a vast ancient savannah that had separated the Amazonian rainforest into two separate ecosystems during the glaciation of other regions. The separation of ecosystems could theoretically support increased speciation. But in the 21st century, additional research was funded to answer hypothetical concerns about the potential extinction of the entire Amazonian ecosystem during predicted global warming. This field work indicated there were areas in the western lowlands near Lake Pata that retained lush tropical rainforest, so the complete natural history of the Amazonian basin during the LGM is developing a more complex narrative in which Hartt's field work can be expounded.

Agassiz and Hartt were also searching in 1865 for evidence that could prove or disprove the 1859 Darwinian evolutionary theory, in contrast to the multiple creation theory it proposed to replace. From a scientific point of view, Darwinism could potentially resolve inconsistencies in the multiple creation narrative, just as multiple creation theory was an attempt to resolve inconsistencies in the single creation theory. The inconsistencies were facts that could not be compellingly explained by each theory.

Evolutionary theory was not immediately accepted because of a lack of fossil evidence (an issue resolved by discovery of more and more fossil "missing links") and its inability to explain the distribution of species better than multiple creation theory (an issue resolved in the 1960s by plate tectonics). There were a few inconsistencies such as the Lamarckian idea of inheritance of acquired characteristics that Darwin had accepted and later expanded upon in his writings on heredity.

Hartt fell in love with Brazil, and spent 15 months exploring the coastal regions from Bahia to Rio de Janeiro. The large zoological collections he made were later used to prepare his Geology and Physical Geography of Brazil (Boston, 1870). In 1868 he was elected professor of natural history at Vassar College, but later in the same year he accepted a post at Cornell University, in Ithaca, New York, and planned to return to Brazil. Charles married Lucy Cornelia Lynde of Buffalo, New York, in 1869. They had two children, Mary and Rollin. Both children became writers.

In all, Hartt participated in four expeditions to Brazil (the Morgan Expeditions) from 1870 to 1878. He collected a great deal of data about the land and the people, contributing to new knowledge about the flora, the fauna, minerals, geography, linguistics and ethnography. He was an accomplished draftsman and illustrator and musician. In his last voyage he collected more than 500,000 specimens, which were donated to the National Museum of Rio de Janeiro, where he worked as the founder and director of the section of geology from 1866 to 1867.

In 1875, following a suggestion by Hartt, the Emperor Dom Pedro II (1825–1891) established the Imperial Geological Commission. The Commission was closed down after two years of work after losing the Emperor's support. Hartt was joined by his wife and children in Brazil in 1875, but they returned to the United States without him when his wife got pregnant.

Hartt died in Rio de Janeiro on 18 March 1878, after contracting yellow fever, at the age of 38. Agassiz died earlier, in 1873, before major discoveries could provide substantial fossil evidence and before the neo-Darwinists improved Darwinism by asserting the Weismann barrier in 1893. Hartt had gathered useful specimens in Brazil that could be explained by the 20th century Darwinian narrative of accelerated evolution, which hypothesized that Amazonian butterflies survived in isolated refuges during ice ages. But in the 21st century the refuge mechanism has been diminished as a possible explanation by research that determined sufficient rainfall maintained a more complete ecosystem, which increases the likelihood of a more complex mosaic mechanism to explain the variations in Hartt's specimens. The ancient pollen data in the Bolivian rainforest of the Amazonian basin indicates that it was savannah during the LGM.

One of Hartt's students, the American geologist Orville Adalbert Derby (1851–1915), succeeded him at the National Museum, after having accompanied him in two of the Morgan Expeditions (1870 and 1871) and having worked with him at the Imperial Commission.

== Publications ==
- Thayer Expedition (1870)
- Geology and physical geography of Brazil (1870)
- Amazonian Tortoise Myths (1875)
- Notes on the Manufacture of Pottery Among Savage Races (1873)

== Bibliography ==
- Sanjad, N. Charles Frederick Hartt and the institutionalization of the natural sciences in Brazil. Hist. cienc. saude-Manguinhos, vol.11 no.2, Rio de Janeiro May/Aug. 2004.
- Lopes, M. M. C. F. 1994 Hartt's contribution to Brazilian museums of natural history'. Earth Sciences History, 13(2), pp. 174–9.
- Freitas, M.V. Hartt: Expedições pelo Brasil Imperial Metalivros, 2002.

== Legacy ==
The Armoured Catfish genus Harttia is named after him.
