= Neoplecostomus microps =

Conservation status
- Least Concern (IUCN 3.1)

Scientific classification
- Kingdom: Animalia
- Phylum: Chordata
- Class: Actinopterygii
- Order: Siluriformes
- Family: Loricariidae
- Genus: Neoplecostomus
- Species: N. microps

Binomial name
- Neoplecostomus microps (Steindachner, 1877)

Synonyms
- Plecostomus microps Steindachner, 1877

Species of fish

Neoplecostomus microps is a species of freshwater ray-finned fish belonging to the family Loricariidae, the suckermouth armoured catfishes, and the subfamily Hypoptopomatinae, the cascudinhos. This catfish is endemic to Brazil. It is the type species of the genus Neoplecostomus.

== Taxonomy ==
Neoplecostomus microps was first formally described as Plecostomus microps in 1877 by the Austrian ichthyologist Franz Steindachner with its type locality given as Rio de Janeiro, maybe the Parahyba River. In 1888 Carl H. Eigenmann and Rosa Smith Eigenmann proposed a new subgenus of Plecostomus named Neoplecostomus and designated P. microps as its type species. Eschmeyer's Catalog of Fishes classifies the genus Neoplecostomus in the subfamily Hypoptopomatinae, the cascudinhos, within the suckermouth armored catfish family Loricariidae.

== Etymology ==
Neoplecostomus microps is classified within the genus Neoplecostomus, this name prefixes neo-, for "new" onto plecostomus, as this genus was proposed as a subgenus of Plecostomus, now known as Hypostomus and classified in the subfamily Hypostominae. The specific name, microps, means "small eye", an allusion to small eyes of this catfish.

== Description ==
Neoplecostomus microps has an elongated body shape and it reaches a standard length of 10.2 cm (4.0 in).

== Distribution and habitat ==
Neoplecostomus doceensis is endemic to Brazil where it is found in the southeastern region in the states of Espírito Santo, Minas Gerais, Rio de Janeiro and São Paulo. It occirs in the basins of the Riberao Grande, Paraiba do Sul and Itapemirim rivers. It is found in the upper and middle reaches of these river basins in the fast flowing stretches of streams and rivers where there are stones and boulders.

== Biology ==
Neoplecostomus microps g=has a diet which is made up of aquatic insect larvae. It breeds in the Austral spring and summer between October and February. The eggs are attached to the bottoms of stones. It is a catfish which lives in rapids, the juveniles at the edges and the adults in the main channel. This species has a prolonged breeding cycle andlow fertility, traits which signify parental care.
