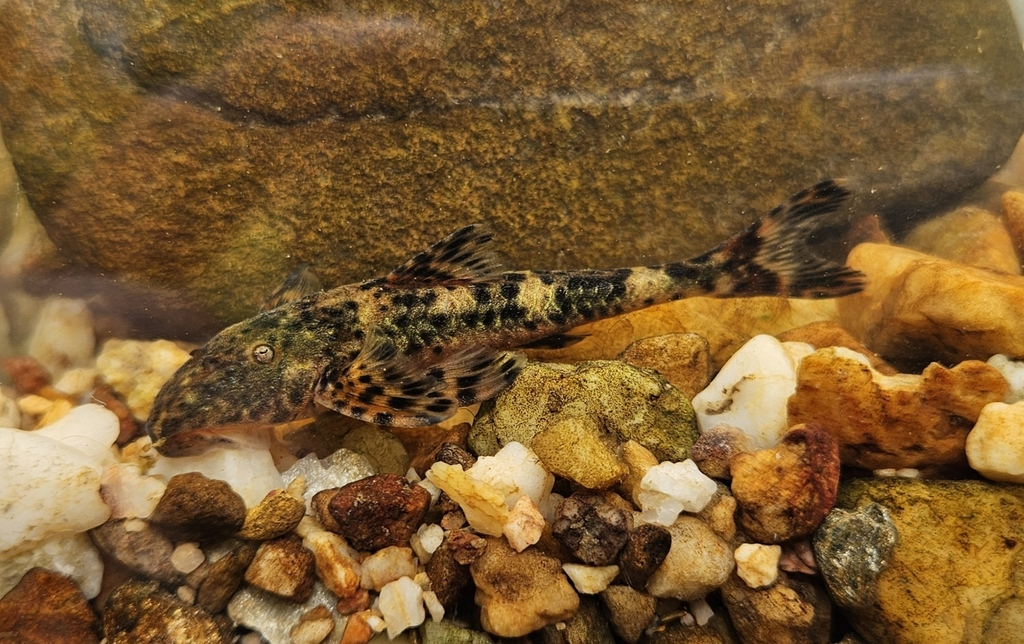

Conservation status
- Data Deficient (IUCN 3.1)

Scientific classification
- Kingdom: Animalia
- Phylum: Chordata
- Class: Actinopterygii
- Division: Teleostei
- Order: Siluriformes
- Family: Loricariidae
- Genus: Neoplecostomus
- Species: N. paranensis

Binomial name
- Neoplecostomus paranensis Langeani, 1990

= Neoplecostomus paranensis =

Species of fish

Neoplecostomus paranensis is a species of freshwater ray-finned fish belonging to the family Loricariidae, the suckermouth armoured catfishes, and the subfamily Hypoptopomatinae, the cascudinhos. This catfish is endemic to Brazil.

== Taxonomy ==
Neoplecostomus paranensis was first formally described in 1990 by the ichthyologist Francisco Langeani-Neto, with its type locality given as the Rio Cubatão, in the upper Paraná River system, Fazenda Santa Carlota, Cajuru in the Brazilian state of São Paulo. Eschmeyer's Catalog of Fishes classifies the genus Neoplecostomus in the subfamily Hypoptopomatinae, the cascudinhos, within the suckermouth armored catfish family Loricariidae.

== Etymology ==
Neoplecostomus paranensis is classified within the genus Neoplecostomus. This name prefixes neo-, for "new" onto plecostomus, as this genus was proposed as a subgenus of Plecostomus, now known as Hypostomus and classified in the subfamily Hypostominae. The specific name paranensis puts the Latin suffix -ensis, which denotes a place, onto parana, referring to the upper basin of the Parańa River, where the type locality is located.

== Description ==
Neoplecostomus paranensis has an elongated body shape and reaches a standard length of 10 cm (3.9 in).

== Distribution ==
Neoplecostomus paranensis is enemeic to Brazil, where it is found in the upper Parana river system. It has been given a wide disstribution, including the Brasília, Distrito Federal, Goiás, Mato Grosso do Sul, Minas Gerais, Paraná and São Paulo, but some authors have suggested that this taxon represents a species complex and have restricted its range to the tributary streams of the Grande River in São Paulo.
