= Neoplecostomus selenae =

Conservation status
- Least Concern (IUCN 3.1)

Scientific classification
- Kingdom: Animalia
- Phylum: Chordata
- Class: Actinopterygii
- Order: Siluriformes
- Family: Loricariidae
- Genus: Neoplecostomus
- Species: N. selenae

Binomial name
- Neoplecostomus selenae Zawadzki, Pavanelli & Langeani, 2008

Species of fish

Neoplecostomus selenae is a species of freshwater ray-finned fish belonging to the family Loricariidae, the suckermouth armoured catfishes, and the subfamily Hypoptopomatinae, the cascudinhos. This catfish is endemic to Brazil.

== Taxonomy ==
Neoplecostomus selenae was first formally described in 2012 by the Brazilian ichthyologists Cláudio Henrique Zawadzki, Carla Simone Pavanelli and Francisco Langeani-Neto with its type locality given as Ribeirão Grande, Ribeirão das Batéias, upstream from bridge at Ribeirão Grande to Intervales road, in the Paranapanema basin in São Paulo. Eschmeyer's Catalog of Fishes classifies the genus Neoplecostomus in the subfamily Hypoptopomatinae, the cascudinhos, within the suckermouth armored catfish family Loricariidae.

== Etymology ==
Neoplecostomus selenae is classified within the genus Neoplecostomus, this name prefixes neo-, for "new" onto plecostomus, as this genus was proposed as a subgenus of Plecostomus, now known as Hypostomus and classified in the subfamily Hypostominae. The specific name, selenae, honours Selena Canhoto Zawadzki, the daughter of Cláudio Henrique Zawadzki.

== Description ==
Neoplecostomus selenae has hypertrophied odontodes on thickened skin the side of the snout and along the ridges in front of the eyes in mature males. It has a wide jaw, a well developed adipose fin and large eyes. This species has an elongated body shape and it reaches a standard length of 10.2 cm (4.0 in).

== Distribution and habitat ==
Neoplecostomus selenae is endemic to Brazil where it was known only from its type locality of the Ribeirão das Batéias. However, subsequently sampling around the Intervales State Park has found this species is present in two other watercourses, Barro Branco stream and the Rio Almas. This catfish occurs in shallow, headwater streams with undisturbed riparian forest with clear, cold water and a fast current over a rocky substrate.
