= Paraopeba River =

Coordinates: 18.214167°S 45.262778°W

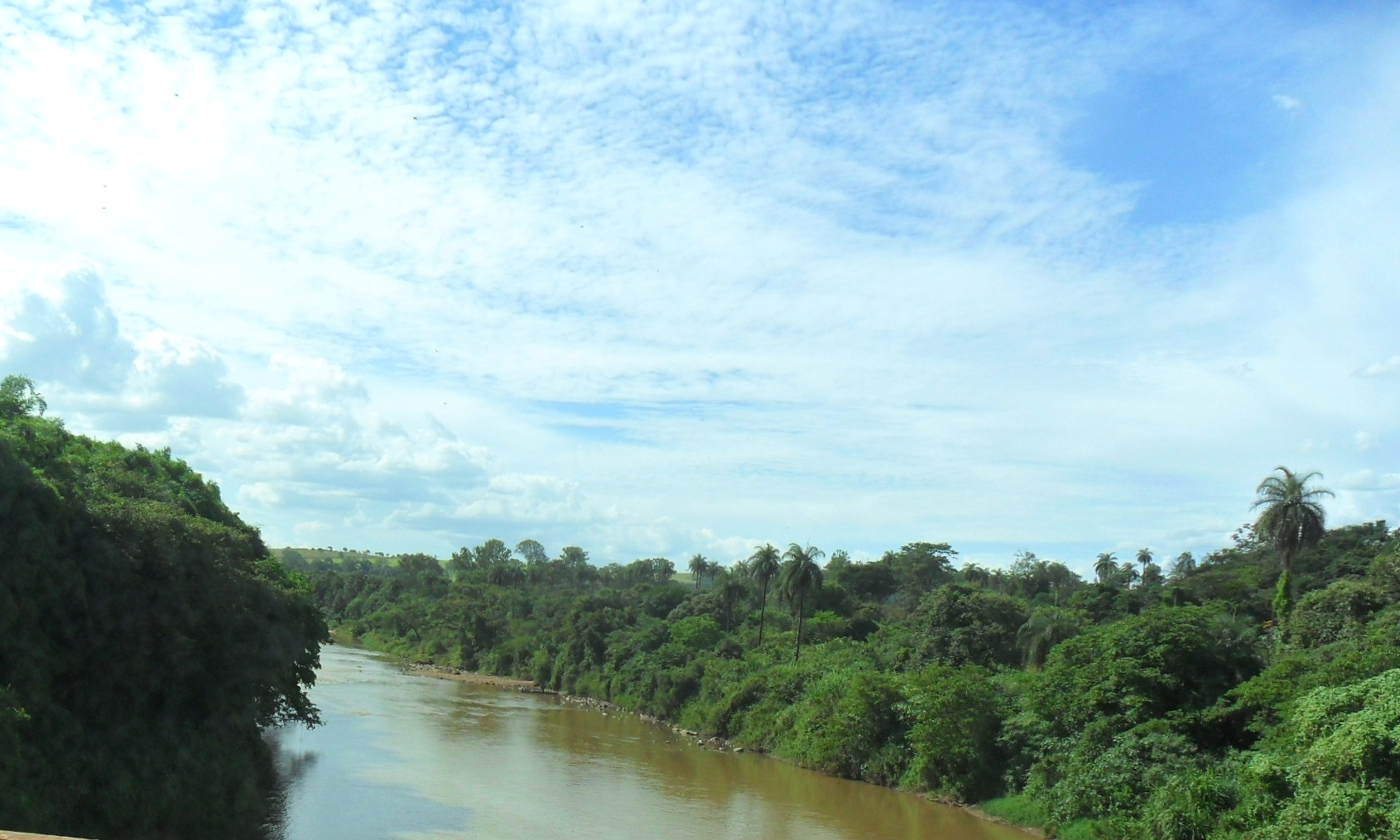
- Paraopeba River on the border of São Joaquim de Bicas and Betim.

Location
- Country: Brazil
- State: Minas Gerais

Physical characteristics
- Source
  - location: Cristiano Otoni
- Mouth
  - location: Três Marias Dam
- Length: 510 km (320 mi)

The Paraopeba River is a river in the state of Minas Gerais, Brazil. In the Tupi language "Para" means "great river or sea," and "peba" means "flat," together meaning "flat river".

The source of the river is situated south of the municipality of Cristiano Otoni, Minas Gerais. The mouth is at the Três Marias Dam in the municipality of Felixlândia in the same state. The length of the river is 510 kilometres (320 mi) and its basin covers an area of 12,090 square kilometres (4,670 sq mi) and 35 municipalities. The most important tributaries are the Macaúba River, the Camapuã River and the Manso River (Minas Gerais). The Paraopeba River is one of the most important tributaries of the São Francisco River, ensuring the yearlong navigability of that river.

On 25 January 2019, the Brumadinho dam collapsed, resulting in exceedingly high heavy mineral levels, with hundreds of times the nominal levels of copper. High levels of lead and chromium where also found in the 20 km (12 mi) nearest to the collapse. These high levels left 120 km (75 mi) of the river ecosystem extremely toxic, leading to the river being called "dead".

== See also ==
- List of rivers of Minas Gerais
