= Agudos =

- Municipality
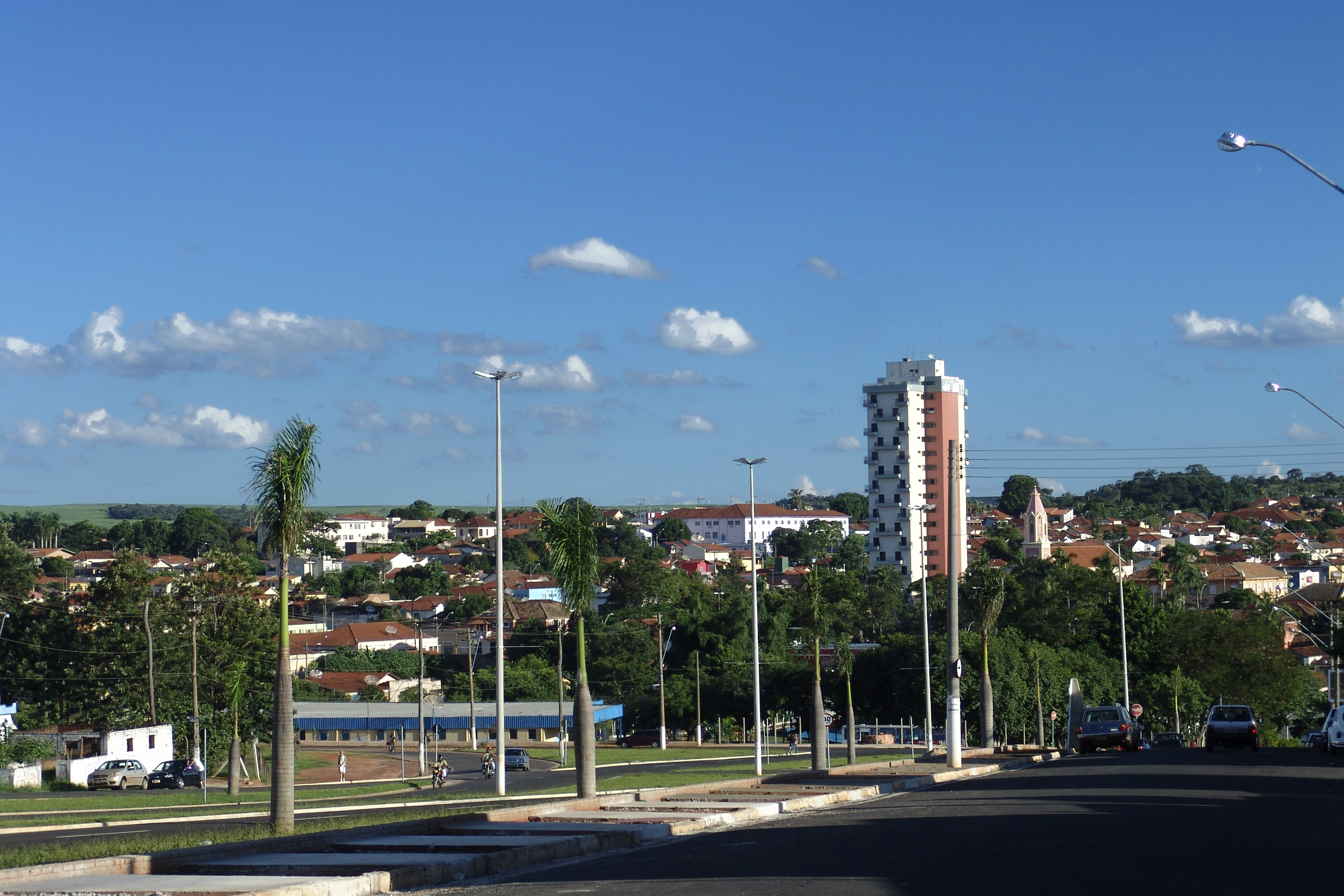

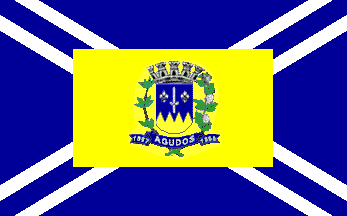
- Flag

- Location in São Paulo state

- Location in Brazil
- Coordinates: 22°28′26″S 48°59′1″W
- Country: Brazil
- Region: Southeast
- State: São Paulo

Area
  - Total: 966 km^{2} (373 sq mi)
- Elevation: 580 m (1,900 ft)

Population (2020)
  - Total: 37,401
  - Density: 38.7/km^{2} (100/sq mi)
- Time zone: UTC−3 (BRT)
- Postal code: 17120-000

Agudos is a Brazilian municipality located in the west-central part of the state of São Paulo. The population is 37,401 (2020 est.) in an area of 966 km^{2}. Distance from the capital is 330 km and is accessed by the Rodovia Marechal Rondon. The municipality was established in 1898, when it was separated from Lençóis.

== Demographics ==
Historical population (municipality)
Year	Population	%±
1920	15,702
1940	22,352	42.4%
1950	16,751	−25.1%
1960	17,075	1.9%
1970	18,543	8.6%
1980	24,478	32.0%
1991	31,706	29.5%
2000	32,484	2.5%
2010	34,524	6.3%
2022	37,680	9.1%

== Geography ==
=== Limits ===
- Bauru
- Lençóis Paulista
- Pederneiras
- Borebi
- Piratininga
- Cabrália Paulista
- Paulistânia

== Economy ==
Agudos; economy is an agricultural municipality and have some industries of national prominence as Duratex and the Ambev. The municipal agricultural production is made up of:

- Pineapples
- Sugar cane
- Cassava
- Corn
- Orange
- Lemon
- Tangerina

The Duratex industry possesses extensive reserves in the city that are managed by the Duraflora. The cattle of Agudos has about 70,000 cows, 10,000 swines and 300,000 chickens.

== Media ==
In telecommunications, the city was served by Companhia Telefônica Brasileira until 1973, when it began to be served by Telecomunicações de São Paulo. In July 1998, this company was acquired by Telefónica, which adopted the Vivo brand in 2012.

The company is currently an operator of cell phones, fixed lines, internet (fiber optics/4G) and television (satellite and cable).

== See also ==
- List of municipalities in the state of São Paulo by population
- Interior of São Paulo
