= Lençóis Paulista =

lençóis Paulista
- Municipality
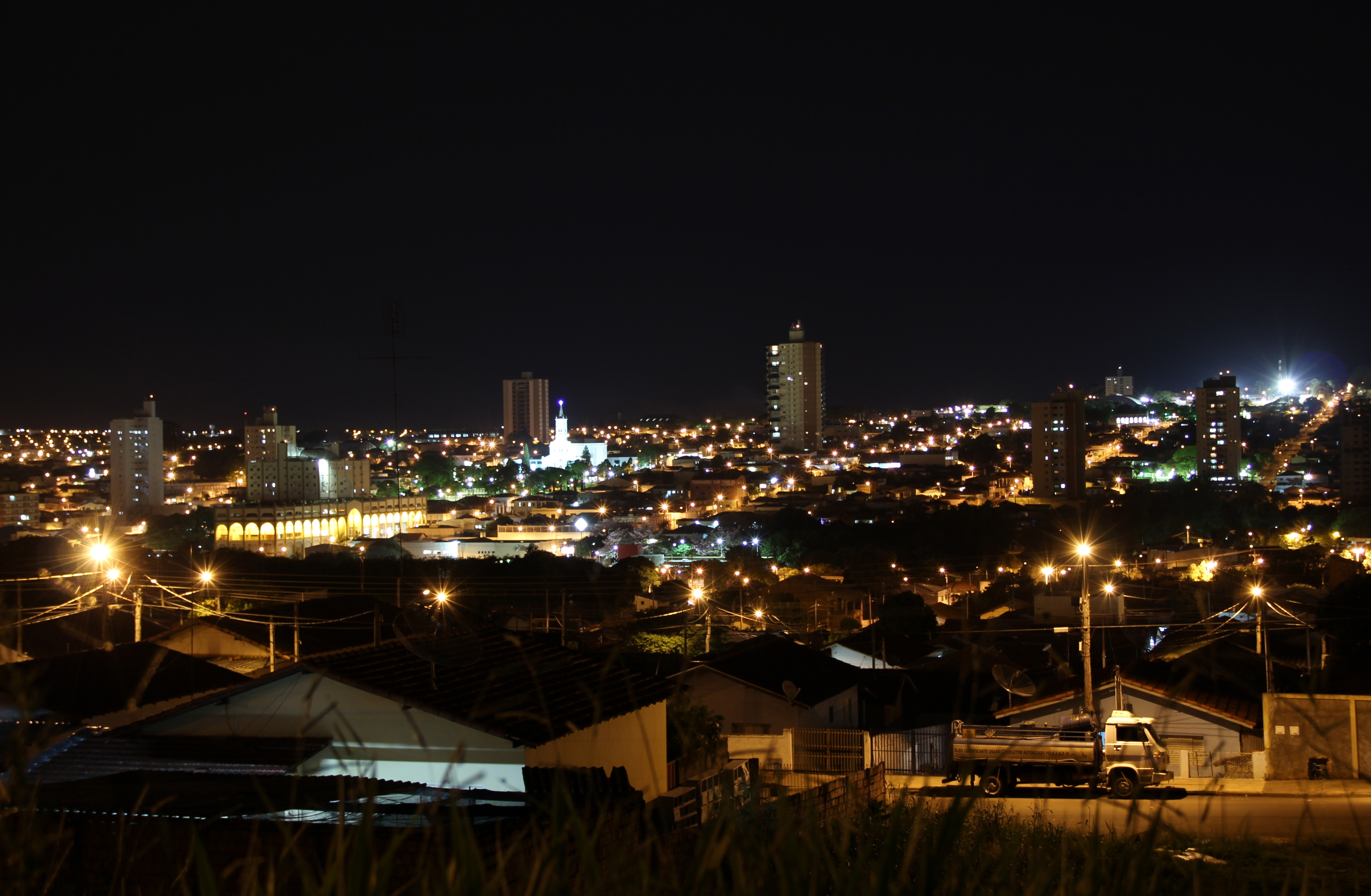

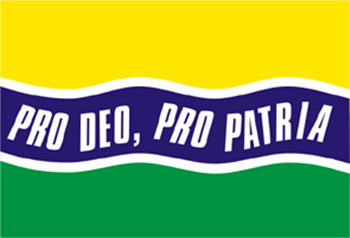
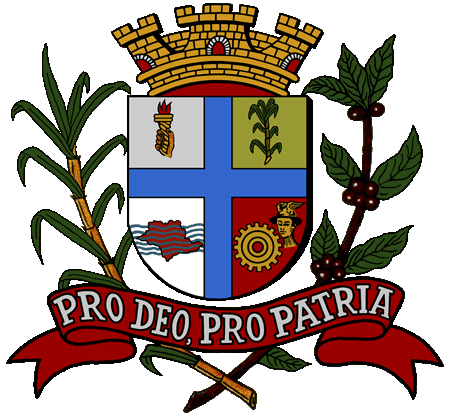
- Flag Coat of arms

- Location in São Paulo state

- Location in Brazil
- Coordinates: 22°35′55″S 48°48′01″W
- Country: Brazil
- Region: Southeast
- State: São Paulo
- Mesoregion: Bauru
- Microregion: Bauru

Government
  - Mayor: André Paccola Sasso

Area
  - Total: 810 km^{2} (310 sq mi)

Population (2020)
  - Total: 68,990
  - Density: 85/km^{2} (220/sq mi)
- Time zone: UTC−3 (BRT)
- Website: www.lencoispaulista.sp.gov.br

Lençóis Paulista is a municipality in the Central West region of the state of São Paulo. The population is 68,990 (2020 est.) in an area of 810 km^{2} (310 sq mi). The elevation is 550 m.

It is home of the largest library in the interior of the State of São Paulo, an institution of higher learning, and a SENAI technical school.

== History ==
The city was founded on April 28, 1858. It was originally named "Lençóis", but a 1940s' decree by then Brazilian president Getúlio Vargas determined that there could be no homonymous cities in Brazil, and since there was already an older city called Lençóis (in Bahia state), the city was renamed Lençóis Paulista. The original proposal was to rename it Ubirama, but the population wanted to keep the original name.

== Geography ==
The territory is drained by waters of the Lençóis River, which is also the source responsible for the water supply of the city. The climate is subtropical, with maximum temperatures around 38 °C between November and February, and minimum temperatures around 3 °C between June and August. The lowest temperature ever recorded was -7°C.

The neighboring municipalities of Lençóis Paulista are Macatuba, Pederneiras and Agudos to the north; Borebi to the west; Avaré and Botucatu to the south; and Pratânia, Areiópolis and São Manuel to the east.

== Economy ==
The economic foundation of the city is its industry, which highlights its production of sugar, alcohol, cellulose, oil, metal structures, renewable energy and food. Its main agricultural products are sugar cane, corn, beans, and wood. The city's commerce, which for many years was subordinate to the neighboring city of Bauru, today is passing through a period of expansion with the building of the Lençóis Paulista Shopping.

The municipality has a Commercial and Industrial Association, the ACILPA, which develops work in partnership with SEBRAE, SENAI and the municipal government. It has the second highest GDP of the Administrative Region of Bauru, and has become the central hub of a commercial micro-region that includes the municipalities of Macatuba, Areiópolis, Borebi and Pederneiras. The city has a mall and an annual industrial trade fair called the FACILPA.

== Media ==
In telecommunications, the city was served by Companhia Telefônica Brasileira until 1973, when it began to be served by Telecomunicações de São Paulo. In July 1998, this company was acquired by Telefónica, which adopted the Vivo brand in 2012.

The company is currently an operator of cell phones, fixed lines, internet (fiber optics/4G) and television (satellite and cable).

== See also ==
- List of municipalities in São Paulo
