= Pederneiras =

- Municipality
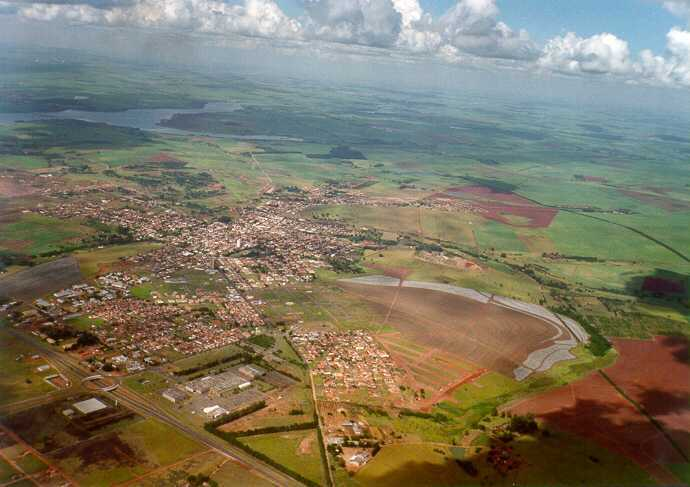

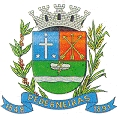
- Flag Coat of arms

- Location in São Paulo state

- Location in Brazil
- Coordinates: 22°21′6″S 48°46′30″W
- Country: Brazil
- Region: Southeast
- State: São Paulo

Area
  - Total: 729 km^{2} (281 sq mi)

Population (2020)
  - Total: 47,111
  - Density: 64.6/km^{2} (167/sq mi)
- Time zone: UTC−3 (BRT)

Pederneiras is a municipality in the state of São Paulo in Brazil. The population is 47,111 (2020 est.) in an area of 729 km^{2} (281 sq mi). The elevation is 475 m above sea level.

== History ==
Starting from 1842, small villages were established in the area of the Tietê River. In 1848 Manoel dos Santos Simões and his two sons, Manuel Leonel dos Santos and João Leonel dos Santos, established a farm in the parish of Botucatu. They named the farm Pederneiras after the large amount of flint stone in the area. In 1865, the settlement became part of the municipality of Lençóis Paulista. Four years later it became a parish with the name São Sebastião de Alegria. Coffee plantations led to growth of the settlement, and in 1891 it became a separate municipality. In 1895, the town's name was changed back into "Pederneiras".

Most of the residents from Pederneiras used to complain because they had to cross long distances to solve their Judicial matters in Lençóis Paulista only (another municipality located around 35 km distance), due to the Judicial district was settled there. Trying to soften the problem, they changed it from Lençóis Paulista to Jaú (a closer municipality located around 25 km distance) in 1895. Only in 1928 they set the own Judicial district in Pederneiras Town.

The birthday of the municipality is featured by the festival called Nations's Fair, where it is possible to find different kind of shows and different kind of dishes from different nationalities.

Politics in the city is clearly separated into two political party: PV and PSDB, the first represented by the Green colour and the other one represented by the Red colour.

== Geography ==
Location: Pederneiras municipality is exactly located in the geographic centre of São Paulo state. It borders the following municipalities: Arealva and Bariri to the north; Boracéia, Itapuí and Jaú to the east; Lençóis Paulista and Macatuba to the south; Agudos and Bauru to the west.

Districts: It has three different districts: Guaianás (west); Vanglória (south); Santelmo (north).

Soil: The soil of this place is formed by the Bauru sandstone and by a variety of productive massapé zones.

Vegetation: The quantity of reserves of the native vegetation is very little. There is the replanting of pine and eucalyptus. About 70% of the rural area soil is used for sugarcane plantation and pastures for the cattle.

Climate: Summer is hot and in humid whereas, winter is dry. Annual temperature goes from 16 °C (60 °F) to 34 °C (94 °F).

=== Demography ===
Total population: 45.000^{Census IBGE 2010}

- Urban: 38,592
- Rural: 2,905
- Men: 20,861
- Women: 20,636

Population density (people per km²): 56.92

Child mortality (children under the age of one): 15.51‰

Life expectancy (years): 71.41

Fertility rate: 2.51

Literacy rate: 89.90%

Human Development Index (HDI): 0.780

=== Hydrography ===
- Tietê River
- Bauru river
- Veado streamlet
- Água Limpa streamlet
- Patos streamlet
- Pederneiras rivulet - in the urban area
- Monjolo rivulet - in the urban area

=== Highways/Roads ===
- SP-225: Comandante João Ribeiro de Barros
- SP-261: César Augusto Sgavioli
- SP-261: Osni Mateus
- Another roads which connects the town with the districts.

== Economy ==
The economy of the town is diversified, most of the agriculture is based on sugarcane and the citriculture is expanding. Pederneiras is developing on metallurgical and mechanical industries, it started when Volvo industry settled in the town in 1974. After this, other medium and small companies started to settle in the town. An important industry is Pedertractor, which is responsible for the manufacturing of truck and tractor parts (Volvo, Caterpillar, Case) like: electric motors, rotors, stators. In May, 2006, the large Japanese Ajinomoto company had also settled, which is making use of the large quantity of sugarcane material available to produce enzymes to export.

== Media ==
In telecommunications, the city was served by Companhia Telefônica Brasileira until 1973, when it began to be served by Telecomunicações de São Paulo. In July 1998, this company was acquired by Telefónica, which adopted the Vivo brand in 2012.

The company is currently an operator of cell phones, fixed lines, internet (fiber optics/4G) and television (satellite and cable).

== See also ==
- List of municipalities in São Paulo
