= Piratininga =

- Municipality
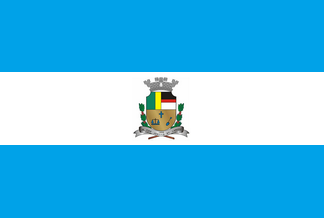
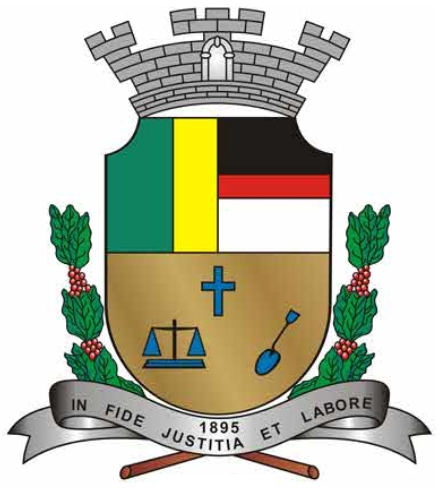
- Flag Coat of arms

- Location in São Paulo state

- Location in Brazil
- Coordinates: 22°24′46″S 49°8′5″W
- Country: Brazil
- Region: Southeast
- State: São Paulo

Area
  - Total: 402 km^{2} (155 sq mi)

Population (2022)
  - Total: 15,108
  - Density: 37.6/km^{2} (97.3/sq mi)
- Time zone: UTC−3 (BRT)

Piratininga is a municipality in the state of São Paulo in Brazil. With an area of 402.409 square kilometers (155.371 sq mi), of which 5.6813 square kilometres (2.1936 sq mi) is urban, it is located 285 km from São Paulo, the state capital, and 749 km from Brasília, the federal capital. Its population in the 2022 demographic census was 15,108 inhabitants, according to the Brazilian Institute of Geography and Statistics (IBGE), ranking as the 299th most populous municipality in the state of São Paulo.

== Geography ==
The territory of Piratininga covers 402.409 square kilometers (155.371 sq mi), of which 5.6813 square kilometres (2.1936 sq mi) constitutes the urban area. It sits at an average altitude of 516 meters above sea level. Piratininga borders these municipalities: to the north, Bauru, Duartina, and Avaí; to the south, Agudos; to the east, Bauru and Agudos again; and to the west, Cabrália Paulista and Duartina again. The city is located 285 km from the state capital São Paulo, and 749 km from the federal capital Brasília.

Under the territorial division established in 2017 by the Brazilian Institute of Geography and Statistics (IBGE), the municipality belongs to the immediate geographical region of Bauru, within the intermediate region of Bauru. Previously, under the microregion and mesoregion divisions, it was part of the microregion of Bauru in the mesoregion of Bauru.

== Demographics ==
Between the censuses of 2010 and 2022, the population of Piratininga registered a growth of just over 19.4%, with an annual geometric growth rate of 1.89%. With 15,108 inhabitants in the 2022 census, the municipality ranked only 299th in the state that year, with 51.4% female and 48.6% male, resulting in a sex ratio of 94.57 (9,457 men for every 10,000 women), compared to 12,072 inhabitants in the 2010 census (85.75% living in the urban area), when it held the 331th state position. Regarding age group in the 2022 census, 67.59% of the inhabitants were between 15 and 64 years old, 19.13% were under fifteen, and 13.25% were 65 or older. The population density in 2022 was 37.54 inhabitants per square kilometer, with an average of 2.86 inhabitants per household.

The municipality's Human Development Index (HDI-M) is considered high, according to data from the United Nations Development Programme. According to the 2010 report published in 2013, its value was 0.779, ranking 73rd in the state (out of 645 municipalities) and 141th nationally (out of 5,565 municipalities), and the Gini coefficient rose from 0.44 in 2003 to 0.48 in 2010. Considering only the longevity index, its value is 0.859, the income index is 0.762, and the education index is 0.723.

== Media ==
In telecommunications, the city was served by Companhia Telefônica Brasileira until 1973, when it began to be served by Telecomunicações de São Paulo. In July 1998, this company was acquired by Telefónica, which adopted the Vivo brand in 2012. The company is currently an operator of cell phones, fixed lines, internet (fiber optics/4G) and television (satellite and cable).

== See also ==
- List of municipalities in São Paulo
