= Piracicaba River =

There are several rivers named Piracicaba River in Brazil:

- Piracicaba River (Minas Gerais)
- Piracicaba River (São Paulo)
