= Lençóis (disambiguation) =

Lençóis may refer to:

- Lençóis, Bahia, Brazil
- Lençóis Paulista, São Paulo, Brazil
- Lençóis Maranhenses National Park, Maranhão, Brazil
