= Cleberson (footballer, born 1992) =

Brazilian footballer

Personal information
- Full name: Cleberson Martins de Souza
- Date of birth: 17 August 1992 (age 34)
- Place of birth: Macatuba, Brazil
- Height: 1.85 m (6 ft 1 in)
- Position: Centre-back

Team information
- Current team: PSS Sleman
- Number: 4

Youth career
- 2010–2012: Athletico Paranaense

Senior career*
Years	Team	Apps	(Gls)
2012–2018	Athletico Paranaense	82	(10)
2018	→ Figueirense (loan)	20	(2)
2019–2020	Sport Recife	8	(0)
2020–2021	CSA	26	(1)
2021	Juventude	16	(1)
2022	Ituano	12	(1)
2022–2024	Madura United	68	(2)
2024–	PSS Sleman	45	(6)
- * Club domestic league appearances and goals as of 4 September 2026

Cleberson Martins de Souza (born 17 August 1992), simply known as Cleberson, is a Brazilian professional footballer who plays as a centre-back for Championship club PSS Sleman.

== Club career ==
Cleberson was born in Macatuba, São Paulo. He joined Athletico Paranaense's youth setup in 2010, after starting it out at Cruzeiro.

On 19 May 2012, after appearing sparingly in the year's Campeonato Paranaense, Cleberson made his professional debut, playing the entire second half in a 4–1 away routing over Joinville for the Série B championship. He appeared in 33 matches during the campaign, scoring his first goal on 24 November against Paraná, as Furacão was promoted to Série A at first attempt.

A backup of Léo and Manoel, Cleberson only appeared in six matches during the 2013 season, making his debut in the main category on 26 May 2013, starting in a 1–2 away loss against Fluminense. He scored his first goal in the competition on 24 November, netting the last of a 6–1 home routing over Náutico.

After profiting from Léo's departure to Flamengo, Cleberson was made a starter by manager Miguel Ángel Portugal. On 5 September 2014 he signed a new deal with the club, running until 2017.

== Honours ==
Individual

- Liga 1 Team of the Season: 2023–24
