= Barra Bonita, São Paulo =

Barra Bonita
- Municipality
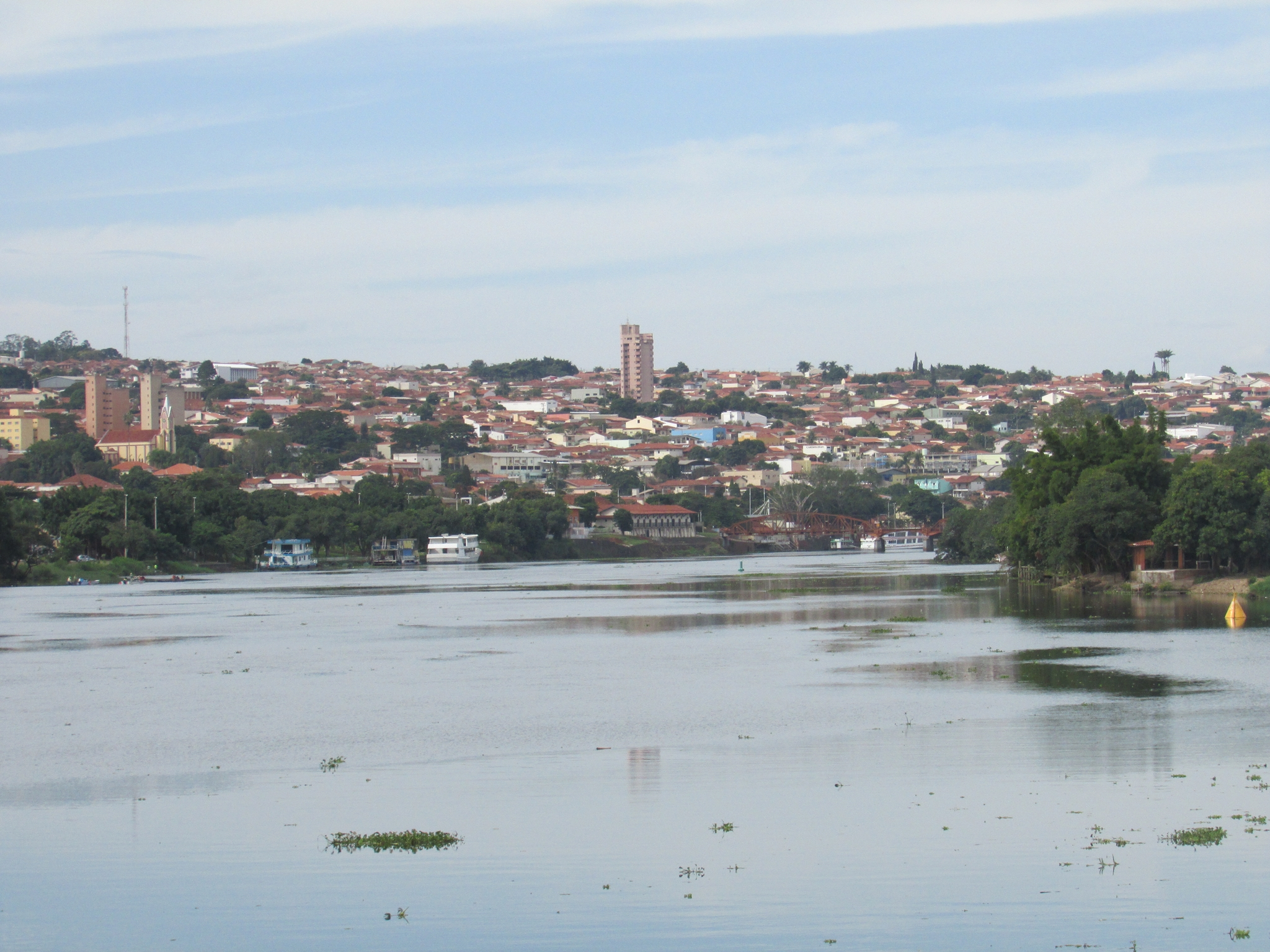
- Barra Bonita and the Tietê River.

- Flag Coat of arms

- Location in São Paulo state

- Location in Brazil
- Coordinates: 22°29′41″S 48°33′29″W
- Country: Brazil
- Region: Southeast
- State: São Paulo
- Mesoregion: Bauru
- Microregion: Jaú

Area
  - Total: 150 km^{2} (58 sq mi)

Population (2020)
  - Total: 36,126
  - Density: 240/km^{2} (620/sq mi)
- Time zone: UTC−3 (BRT)

Barra Bonita is a municipality in the state of São Paulo in Brazil. The population is 36,126 (2020 est.) in an area of 150 km^{2} (58 sq mi). The elevation is 457 m.

== Demographics ==
Historical population (municipality)
Year	Population	%±
1920	9,315
1940	13,548	45.4%
1950	11,168	−17.6%
1960	14,558	30.4%
1970	17,328	19.0%
1980	22,594	30.4%
1991	30,841	36.5%
2000	35,487	15.1%
2010	35,246	−0.7%
2022	34,346	−2.6%

== Media ==
In telecommunications, the city was served by Companhia Telefônica Brasileira until 1973, when it began to be served by Telecomunicações de São Paulo. In July 1998, this company was acquired by Telefónica, which adopted the Vivo brand in 2012.

The company is currently an operator of cell phones, fixed lines, internet (fiber optics/4G) and television (satellite and cable).

== See also ==
- List of municipalities in São Paulo
