= Jundiaí River (São Paulo) =

Coordinates: 23°12′41″S 47°17′34″W

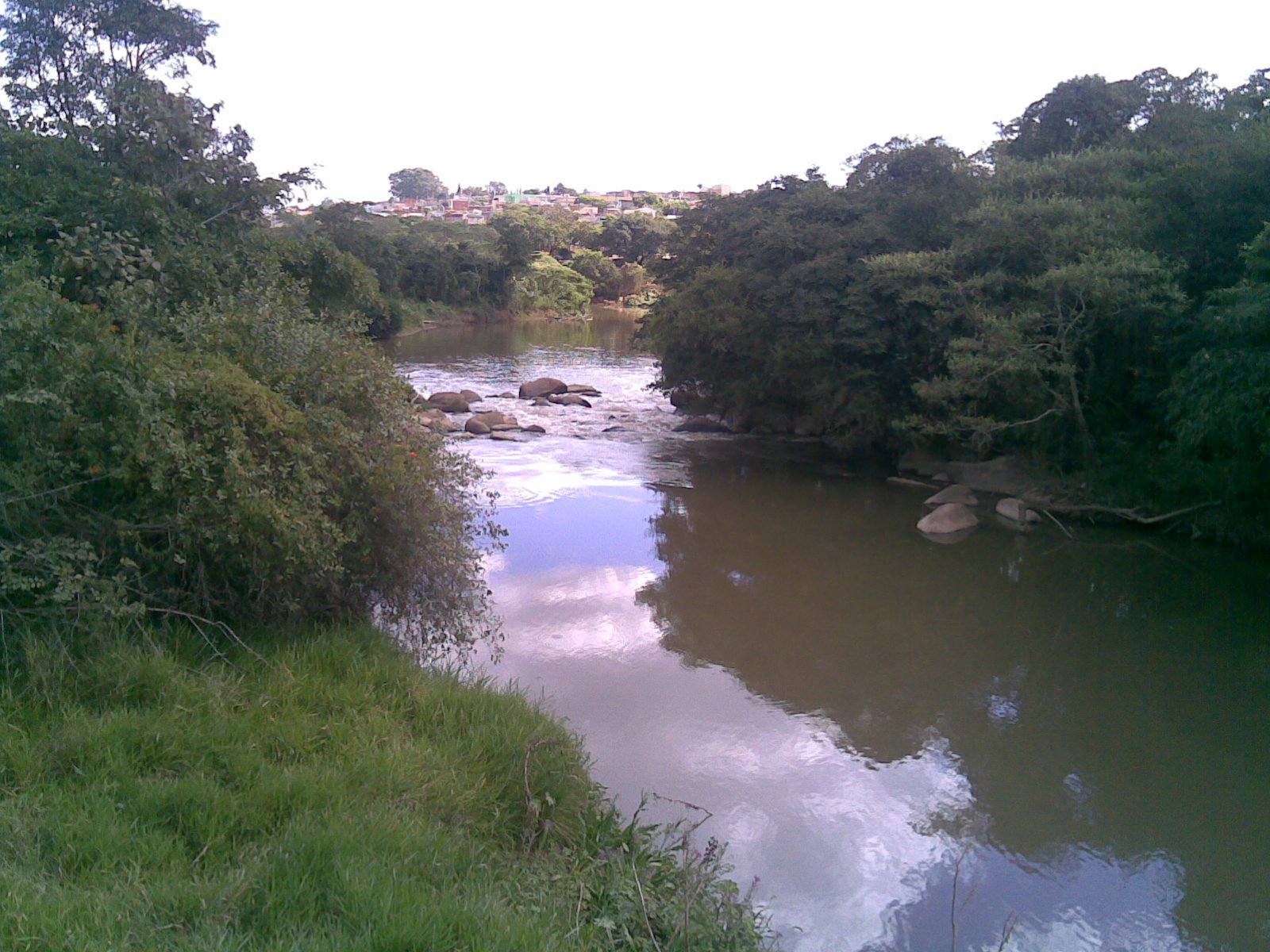

Location
- Country: Brazil

Physical characteristics
- Source
  - location: São Paulo state
- Mouth
  - location: Tietê River

The Jundiaí River (Portuguese, Rio Jundiaí) is a river of São Paulo state in southeastern Brazil. It is a tributary of the Tietê River, which it joins at Salto after flowing through the city of Jundiaí.

== See also ==
- List of rivers of São Paulo
- Tributaries of the Río de la Plata
