= Paulistânia =

- Municipality
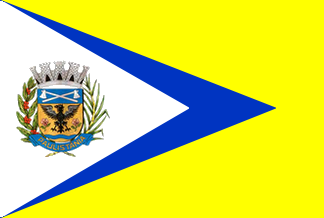
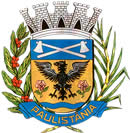
- Flag Coat of arms

- Location in São Paulo state

- Location in Brazil
- Coordinates: 22°34′42″S 49°24′10″W
- Country: Brazil
- Region: Southeast
- State: São Paulo

Area
  - Total: 257 km^{2} (99 sq mi)

Population (2020)
  - Total: 1,834
  - Density: 7.14/km^{2} (18.5/sq mi)
- Time zone: UTC−3 (BRT)

Paulistânia is a municipality in the state of São Paulo in Brazil. The population is 1,834 (2020 est.) in an area of 257 km^{2}. The elevation is 645 m.

== Media ==
In telecommunications, the city was served by Telecomunicações de São Paulo. In July 1998, this company was acquired by Telefónica, which adopted the Vivo brand in 2012. The company is currently an operator of cell phones, fixed lines, internet (fiber optics/4G) and television (satellite and cable).

== See also ==
- List of municipalities in São Paulo
