= Tietê River =

River in São Paulo, Brazil

Coordinates: 20°37′40″S 51°33′54″W

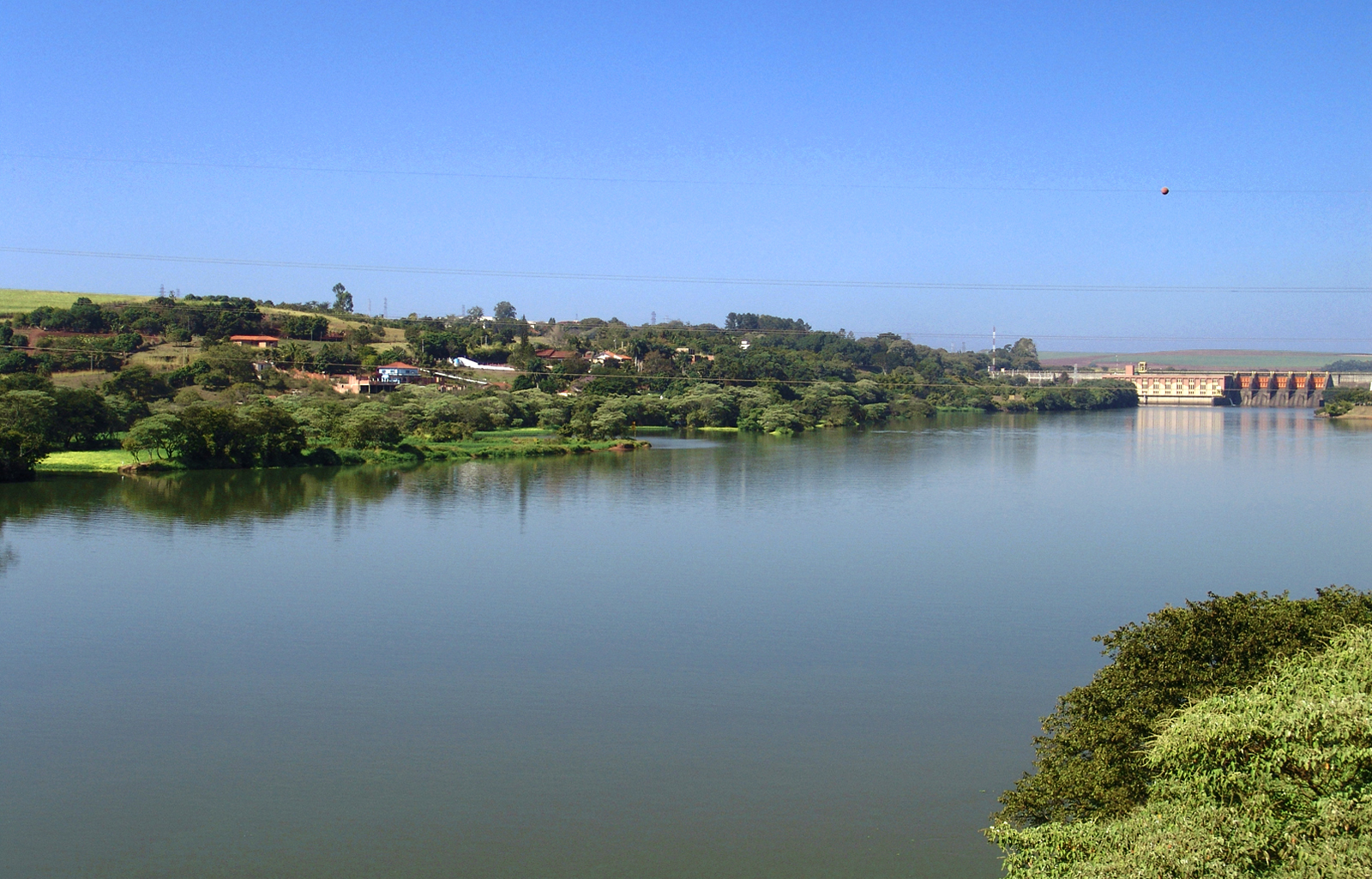
- Tietê River at Barra Bonita and Igaraçu do Tietê

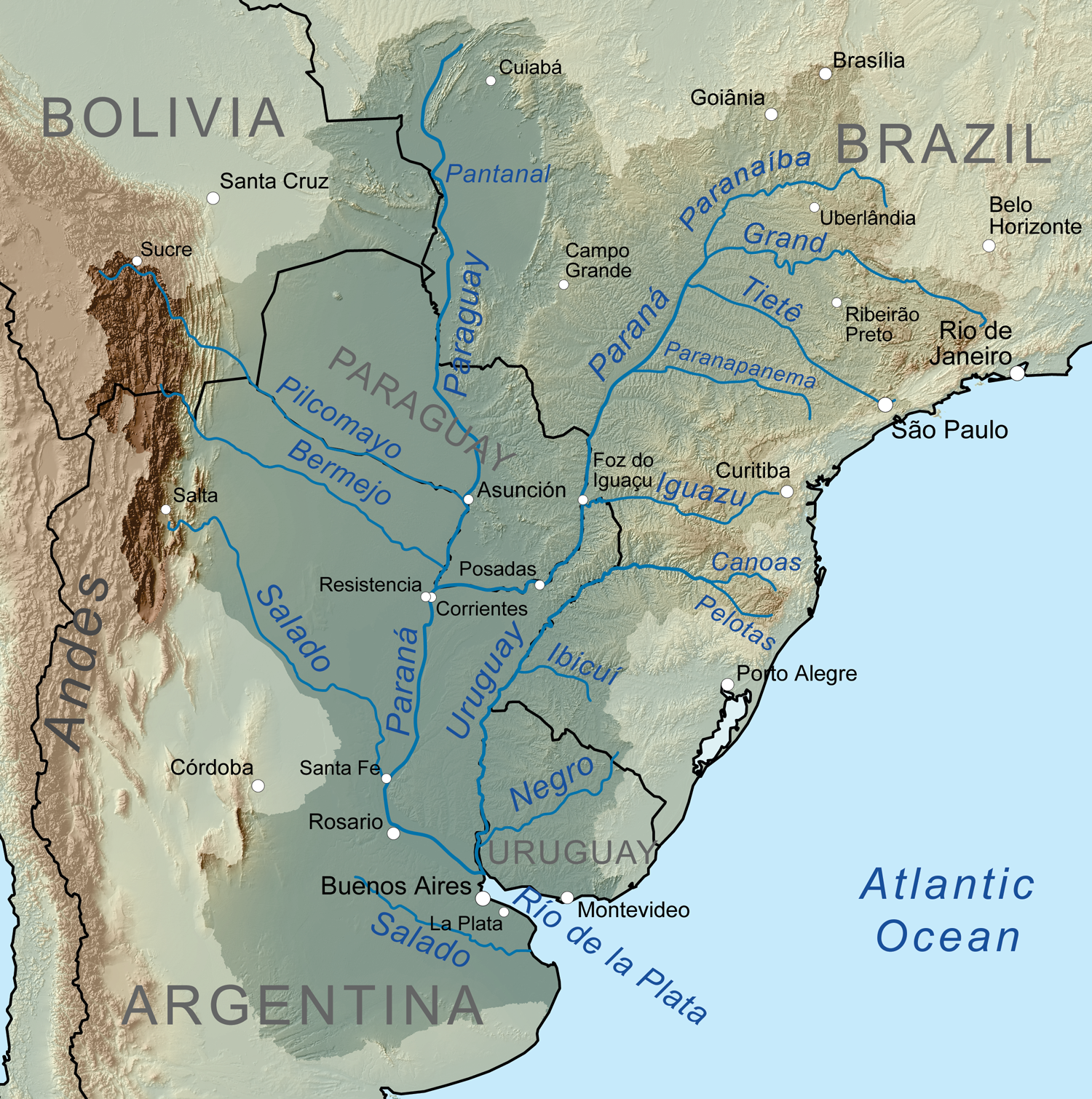
- Map of the La Plata Basin, showing the Tietê River flowing from São Paulo to the Paraná River.
- Native name: Rio Tietê (Portuguese)

Location
- Country: Brazil
- Region: South America

Physical characteristics
- Source: Salesópolis, Serra do Mar
  - elevation: 1,120 m (3,670 ft)
- Mouth: Lake at the Eng Souza Dias (Jupiá) Dam, Paraná River
  - elevation: 280.5 m (920 ft)
- Length: 1,150 km (710 mi)
- Basin size: 72,168 km^{2} (27,864 mi^{2})
- Discharge
  - location: Near mouth
  - average: (Period: 1971–2000)937.2 m^{3}/s (33,100 cu ft/s)

Basin features
- Progression: Paraná → Río de la Plata → Atlantic Ocean
- River system: Río de la Plata

The Tietê River (Portuguese: Rio Tietê [tʃi.eˈte]) is a Brazilian river in the state of São Paulo.

The first known use of the name Tietê was on a map published in 1748 by d’Anville. The name means "great river" in Old Tupi, from ty + eté.

The Tietê River is a historically significant and economically important river, which stretches 450 kilometers and allows for navigation of barges carrying various goods.

Pollution of the Tietê River began subtly in the 1920s, but it has worsened significantly over time. In September 2010, National Geographic identified the river as the most polluted in Brazil. Despite efforts to clean up the river, it still suffers from pollution and environmental degradation, and some species are threatened, or possibly extinct.

== Source ==
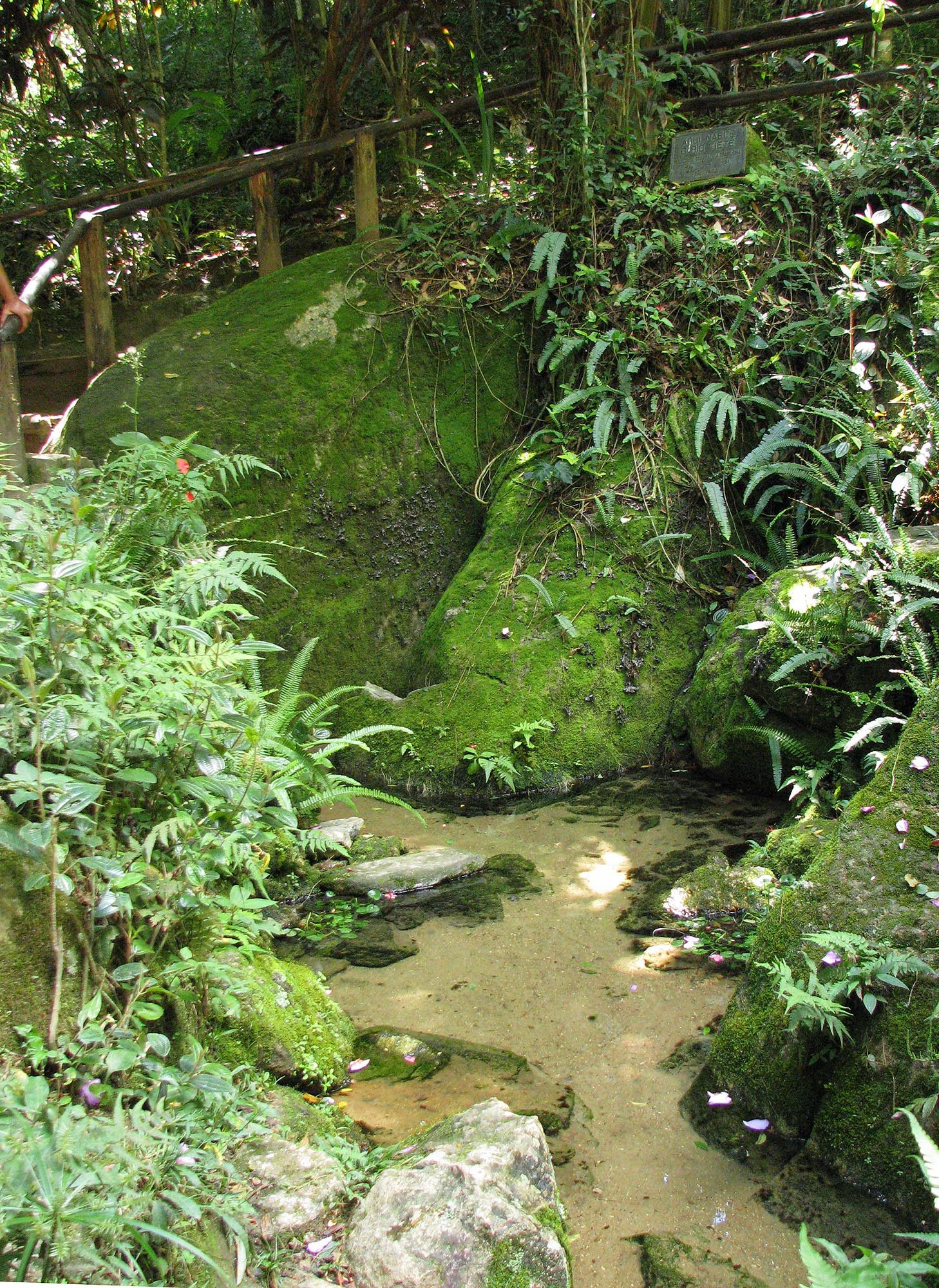
Source of the Tietê River in Salesópolis: The water flows over stones.

The headwaters are in the Serra do Mar, to the east of São Paulo.

== Salesópolis hydroelectric station ==
One of the first hydroelectric power stations constructed in Brazil, "Usina Parque de Salesópolis", constructed in 1912 by the São Paulo Tramway, Light and Power Company, is on the Tietê, in the municipality of Salesópolis. It generated energy from the water dropping a height of 72m through a pair of surface pipes. The dam was built at the lip of a waterfall, and thus is only 5m high.

== Navigation on the waterway Tietê-Paraná ==
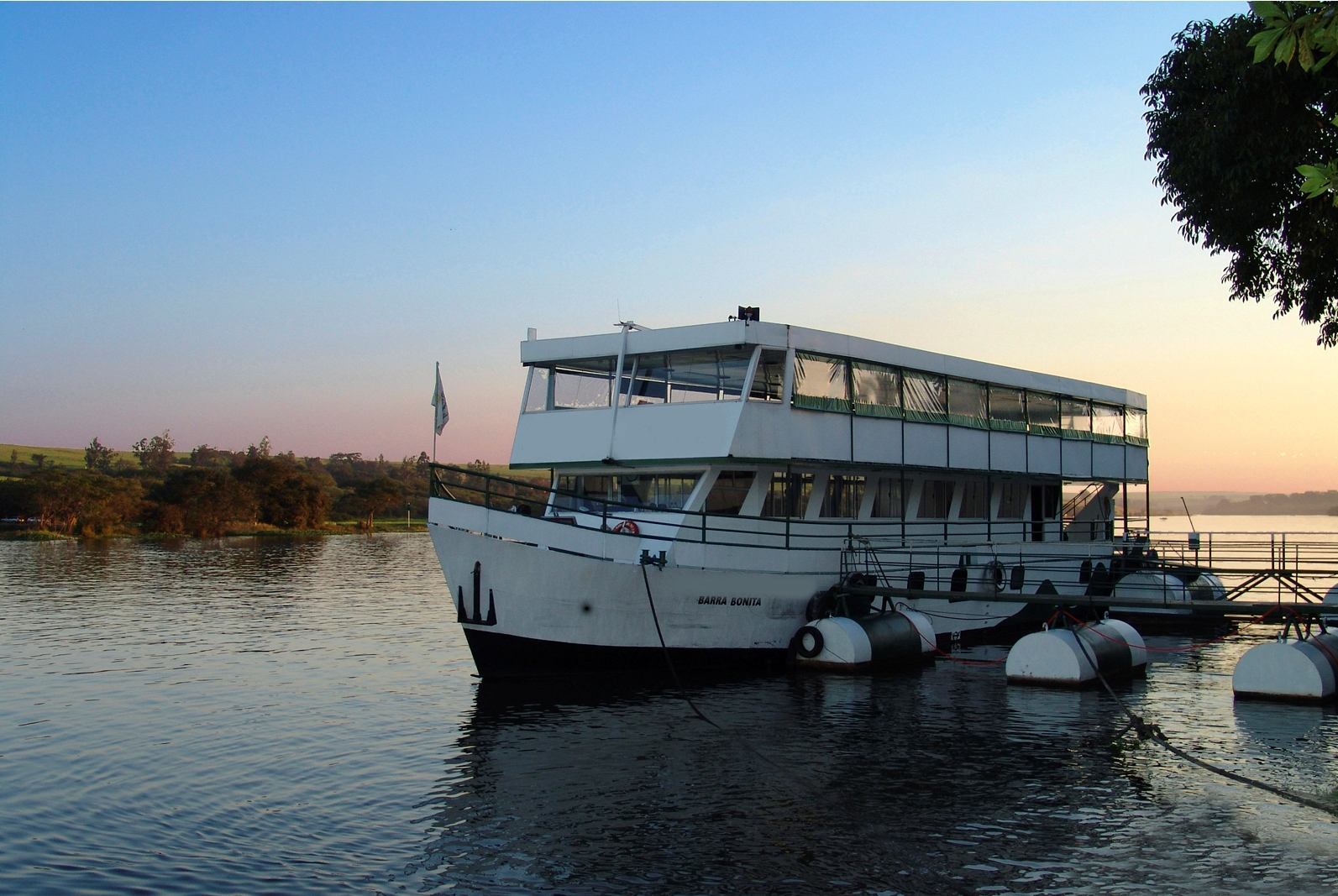
Tourism in Barra Bonita, in the interior of São Paulo.

Several dams ( for instance the Barra Bonita ) on the river have ship locks to ensure that navigation on the river is possible. The waterway of the Tietê-Paraná permits navigation over a length of 1,100 kilometres (680 mi) between Conchas on the River Tietê (São Paulo) and São Simão (Goiás), on the Paranaíba River and then, up to ltaipu, attaining 2,400 kilometres (1,500 mi) of waterway. Barges transport produce at a cost which is lower than road transport with, for example, more than one million metric tons of grains (maize) per year being transported an average distance of 700 kilometres (430 mi). All river ship freight including such commodities like sand, gravel, and sugarcane, total approximately 2 million metric tons. (source : DNIT) About 450 kilometres (280 mi) of the Tietê River is fully navigable

== Pollution and environmental degradation ==
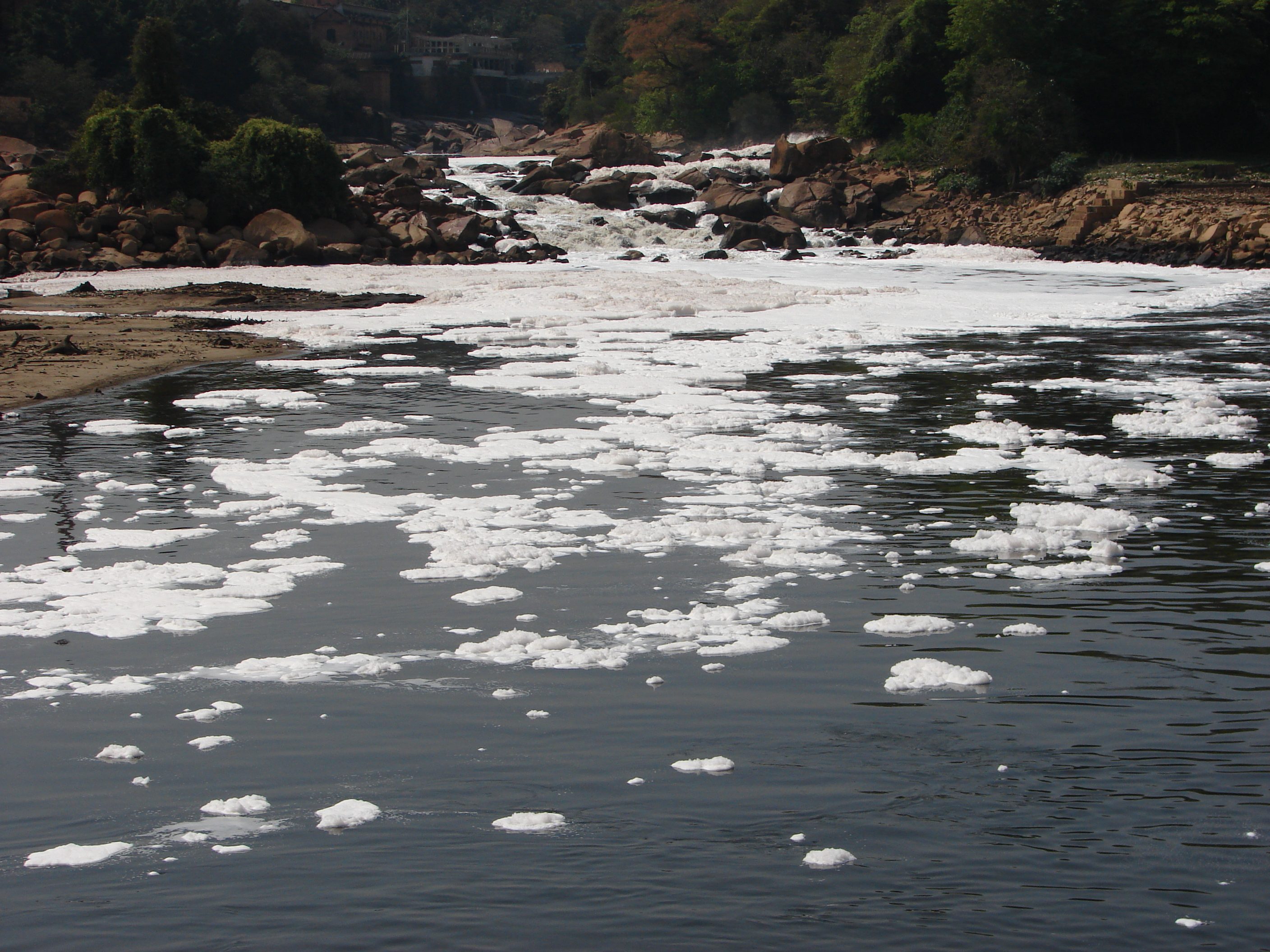
Pollution of the city of Salto, interior of São Paulo.

Although the Tiete River is said to be one of the most important rivers economically for the state of São Paulo and for the country, the Tietê River is best known for its environmental problems, especially for the stretch through the city of São Paulo.

The pollution of the Tietê River did not start long ago. Even in the 1960s, the river still had fish in the stretch within the capital. However, the environmental degradation of the Tietê River started subtly in the 1920s with the construction of the Guarapiranga Reservoir, by the Canadian firm São Paulo Tramway, Light and Power Company, for the later generation of electrical energy in the hydroelectric power stations Edgar de Souza and Rasgão, situated in Santana de Parnaíba. This intervention altered the regime of the waters in the capital and was accompanied with some rectification works also by the São Paulo Tramway, Light and Power Company, which left the bed of the river less winding, in the region between Vila Maria and “Freguesia do Ó.”

Even in the 1920s and 1930s, the river was utilised for fishing and sports activities were famous as were the nautical races on the river. During this period boat race clubs were created along the length of the river, such as the Club of the Tietê races and the Espéria, clubs that exist till now.

In September 2010 National Geographic identified the river as the most polluted in Brazil.

Several species from the Tietê River are considered threatened and one of these, the catfish Heptapterus multiradiatus, is possibly already extinct.

== The Tietê project ==
The governor of São Paulo ordered Sabesp, the company responsible for sanitation in the state, to establish a program to clean up the river. The state at the same time sought help at the Inter American Development Bank, and proposed a project based on the former studies of SANEGRAN.

After more than 16 years, the cleaning up of the River Tietê is still far short of desired levels, but encouraging progress has been made. At the end of the 1990s, the capacity of sewage treatment has been expanded: Sabesp has expanded the treatment capacity of the Wastewater Treatment Plant in Barueri, and the Seasons of the Sewage Treatment at San Miguel, to treat the rest of the sewage of the city of São Paulo.

== Tributaries of the Tietê River ==
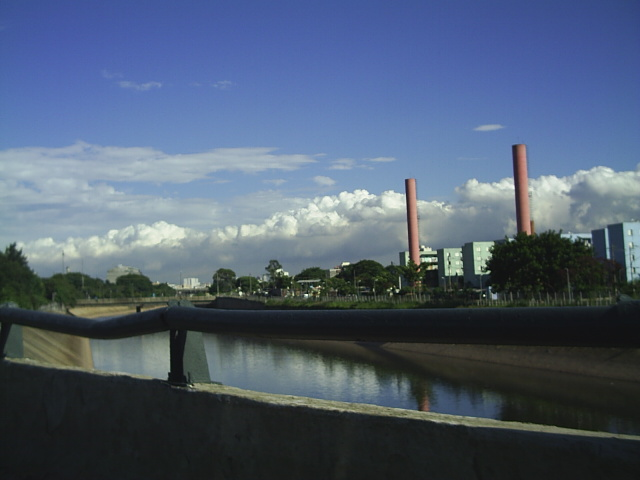
Tamanduateí River, one of Tietê River's tributaries.

- Pinheiros River
- Tamanduateí River
- Aricanduva River
- Baquirivu-Guaçu River
- Batalha River
- Bauru River
- Biritiba-Mirim River
- Capivara River
- Capivari River
- Cotia River
- Dourado River
- Jacaré-Guaçu River
- Jacaré-Pepira River
- Jaú River
- Jundiaí River
- Piracicaba River
- São Lourenço River
- Sorocaba River

== Gallery ==
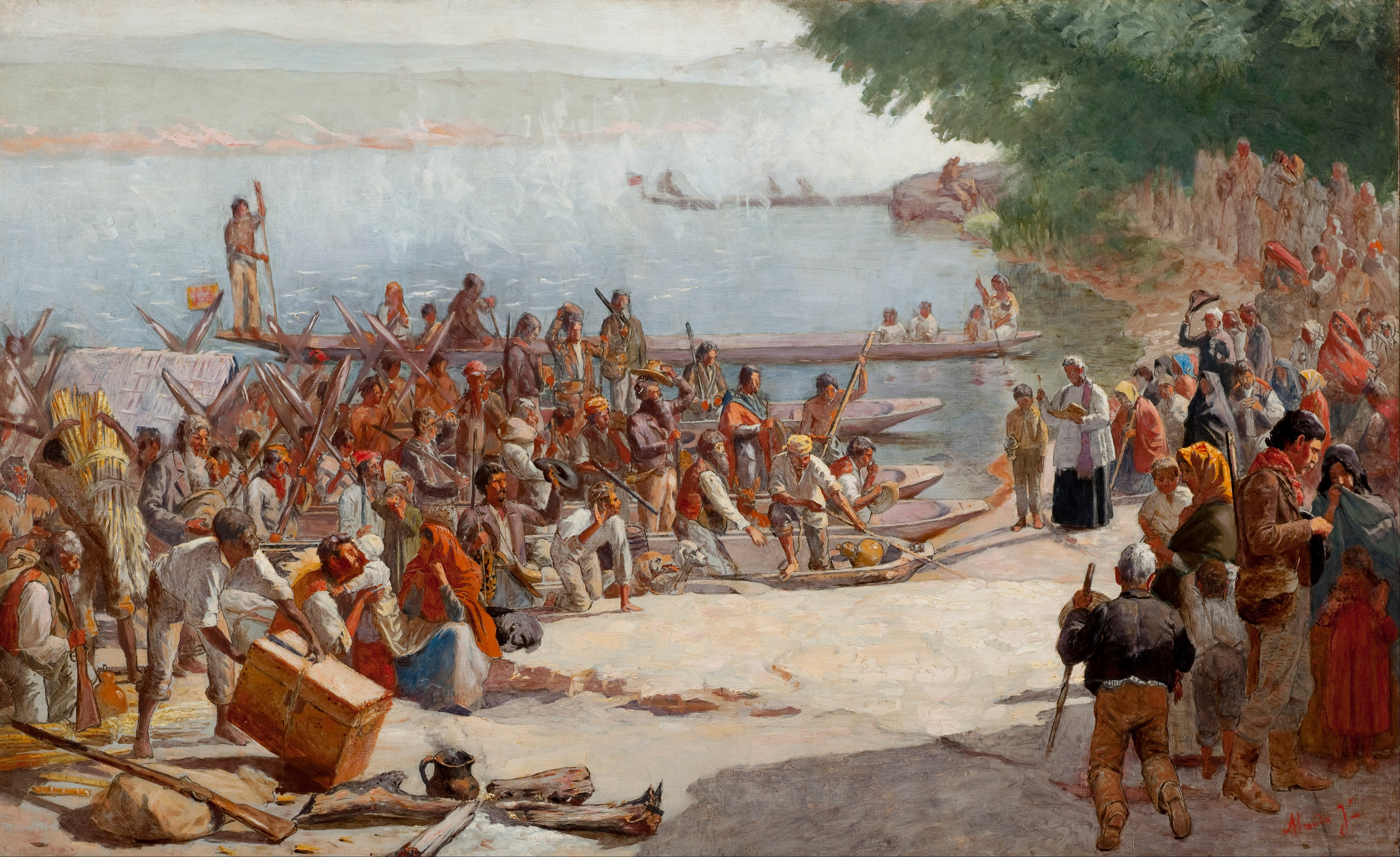
River expedition from Port of Araritaguaba (now Porto Feliz), Tietê River (Almeida Júnior, 1897, oil on canvas)

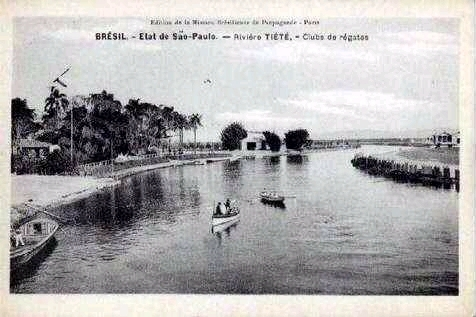
Rio Tietê in São Paulo, retraced from an old postcard.

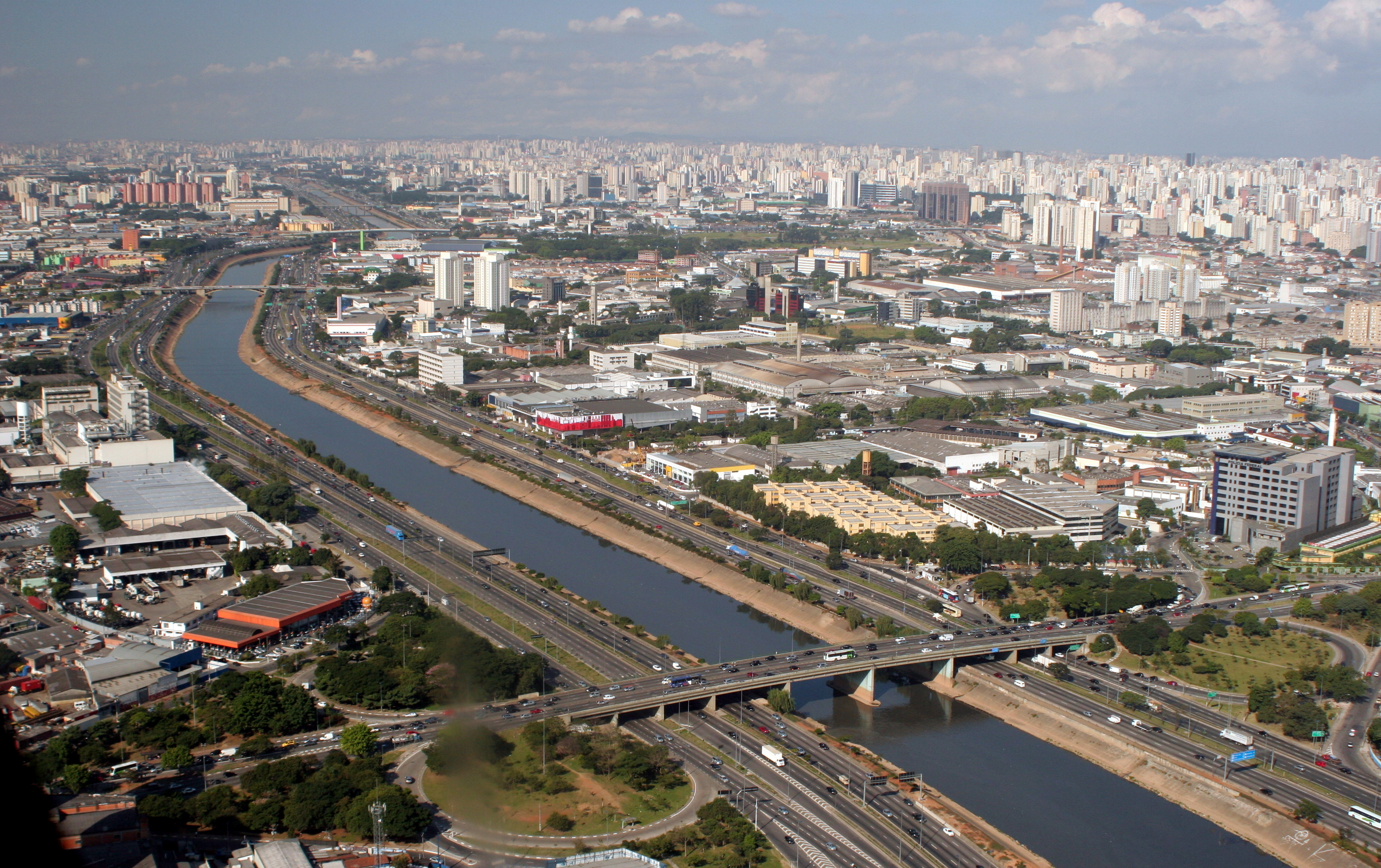
Marginal Tietê, with the Tietê River, in São Paulo.

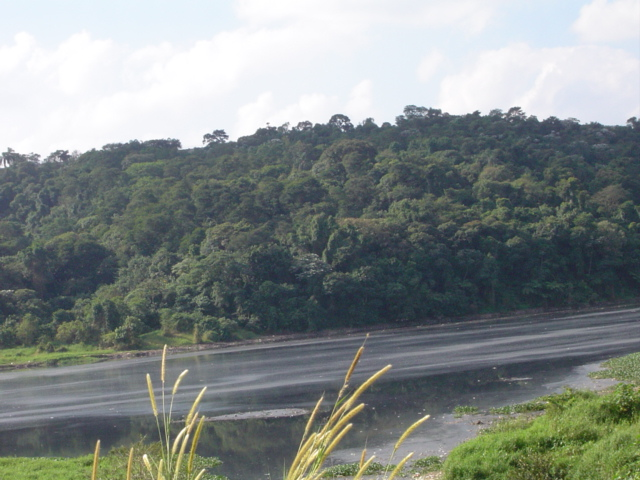
Pollution visible in the waters of the river, passing through Santana de Parnaíba, west of the Metropolitan Region of São Paulo.

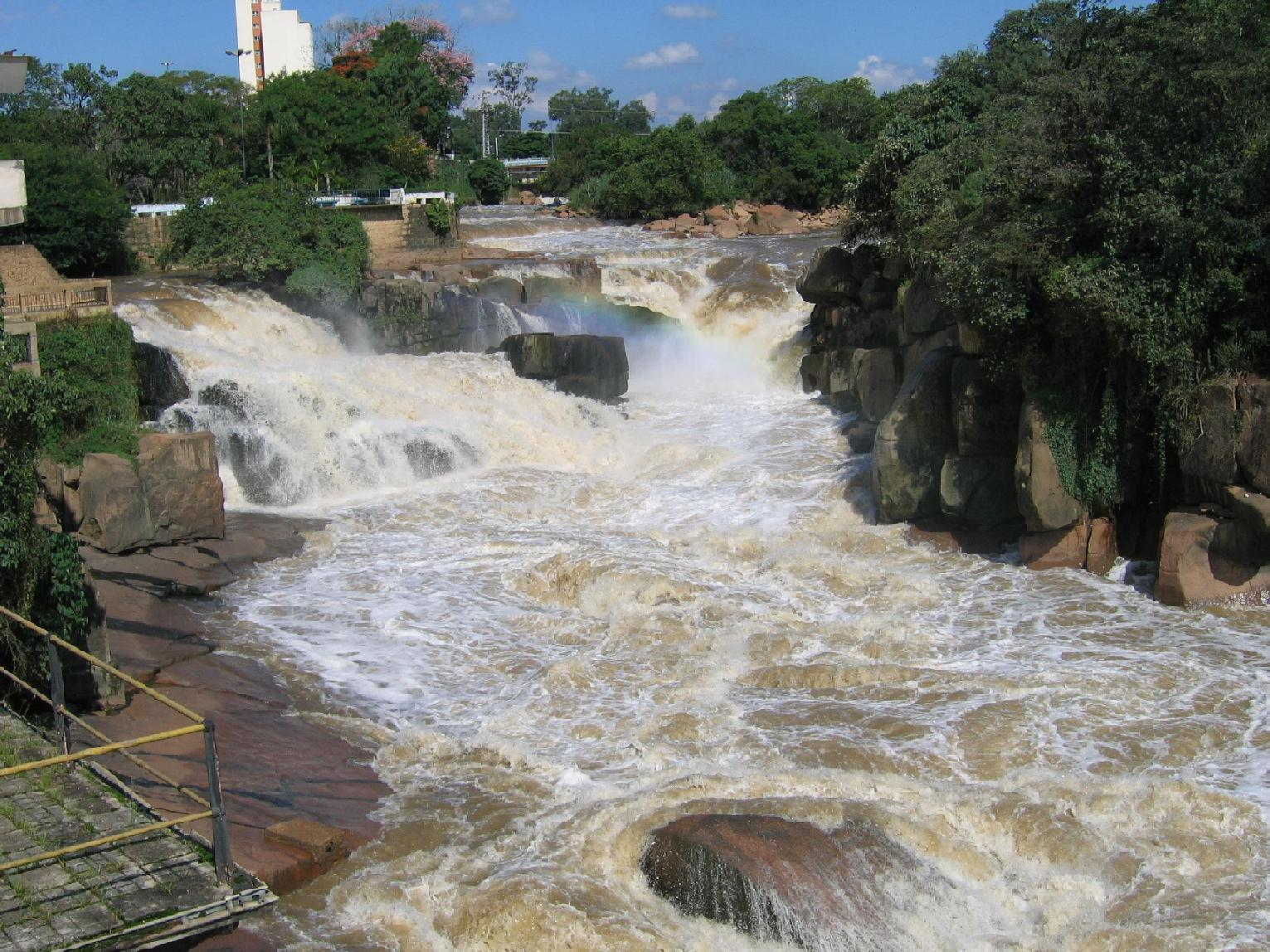
The Tietê river in the municipality of Salto

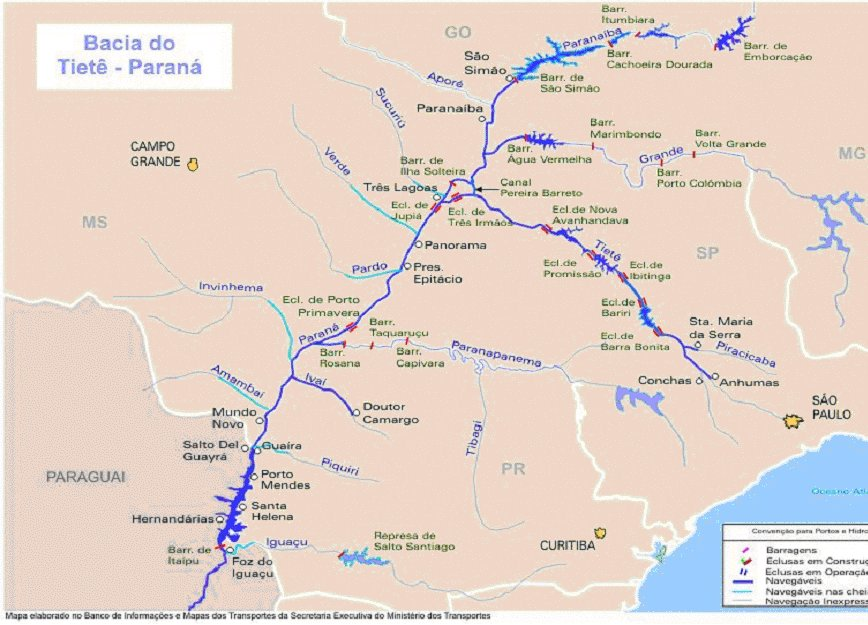
Bacia Tietê-Paraná.

== See also ==
- Jacaré-Guaçu River
- Piracicaba River (São Paulo)
