= Piracicaba River (São Paulo) =

Coordinates: 22°36′53″S 48°19′12″W

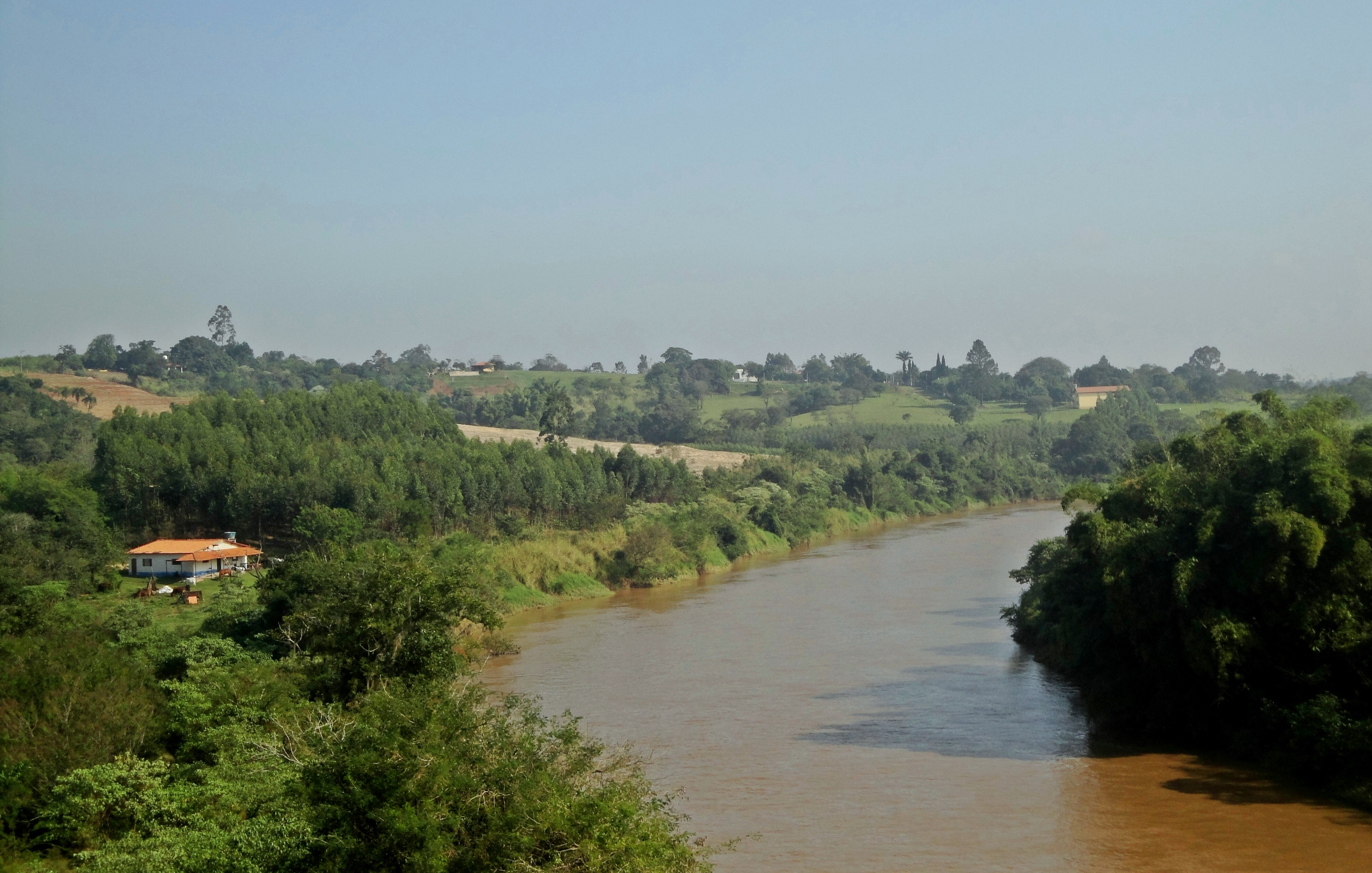

- Location within Brazil

Location
- Country: Brazil

Physical characteristics
- Source
  - location: São Paulo state
- Mouth
  - location: Tietê River
- Length: 115 km (71 mi)
- Basin size: 12,400 km^{2} (4,800 sq mi)
- Discharge
  - average: 144 m^{3}/s (5,100 cu ft/s)

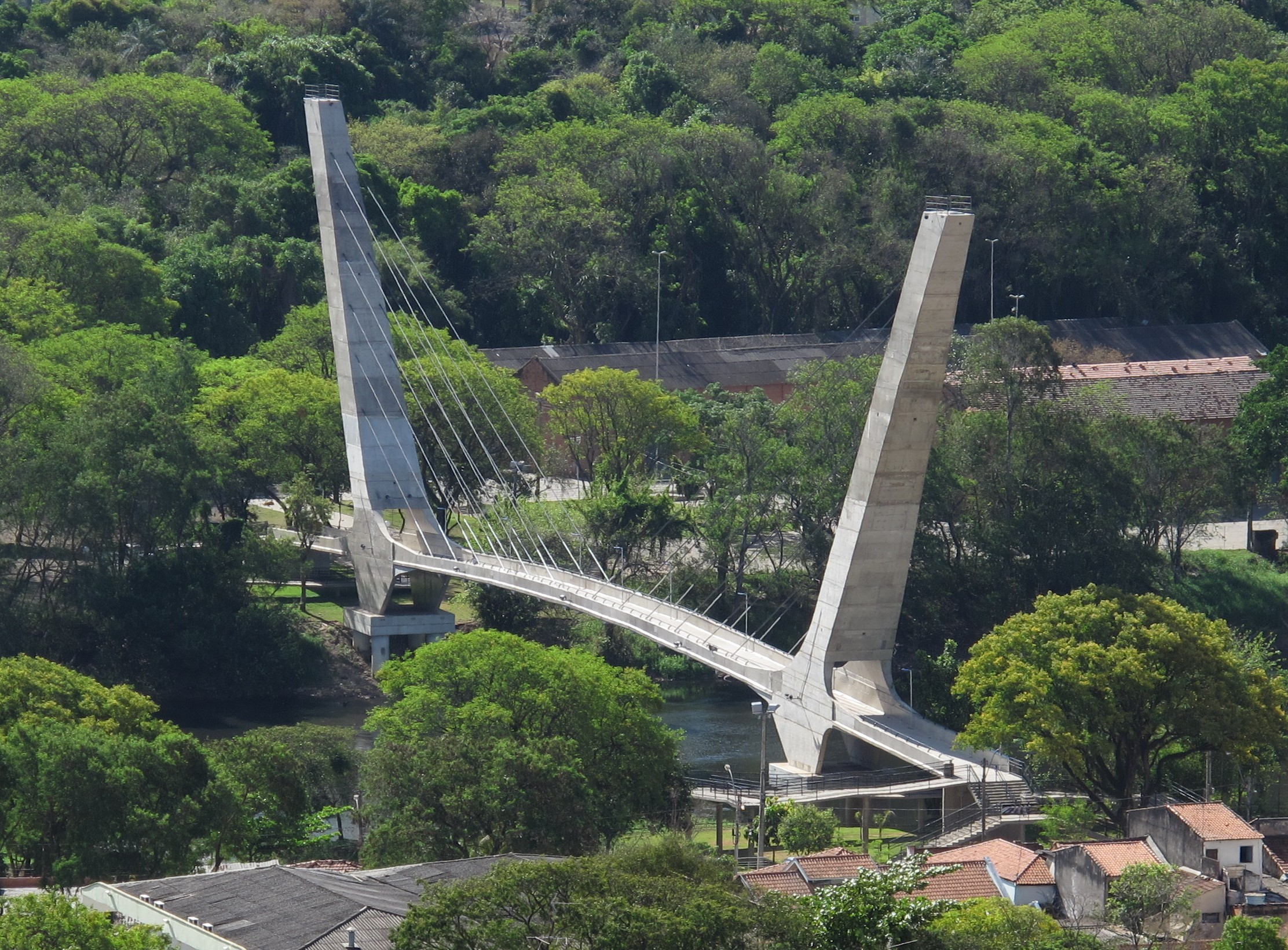
Footbridge over the Piracicaba River in Piracicaba

The Piracicaba River is a river of São Paulo state in southeastern Brazil. It is a tributary of the Tietê River, which it joins in the reservoir created by Barra Bonita Dam. There is also another Piracicaba river in the state of Minas Gerais, named after the one from São Paulo state, since the early colonizers of Minas Gerais largely came from São Paulo.

== Geography ==
The basin of the Piracicaba River extends over an area of 12,531 km², located in the southeast of the state of São Paulo and extreme south of Minas Gerais.

The Piracicaba river is born from the junction of the Atibaia and Jaguari rivers, in the municipality of Americana. After crossing the city of Piracicaba, it receives the waters of its main tributary, Corumbataí river. The Piracicaba River runs 115 km from its source to its mouth on the Tietê River between the municipalities of Santa Maria da Serra and Barra Bonita.

Piracicaba has several meanders that make the waters of its bed suitable for the navigation of small boats after the city of Piracicaba. Among the versions of the origin of the river name, there is that, due to its meanders, the fish get impounded, meaning in Tupi "place where the fish stops".

The watershed of the Piracicaba River is located in one of the most developed regions of the state of São Paulo, encompassing municipalities such as Bragança Paulista, Campinas, Limeira, Americana, Atibaia, Rio Claro, Santa Bárbara d'Oeste and Piracicaba.

== See also ==
- List of rivers of São Paulo
- Tributaries of the Río de la Plata
