= Cabrália Paulista =

Municipality in the state of São Paulo in Brazil

- Municipality
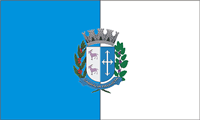
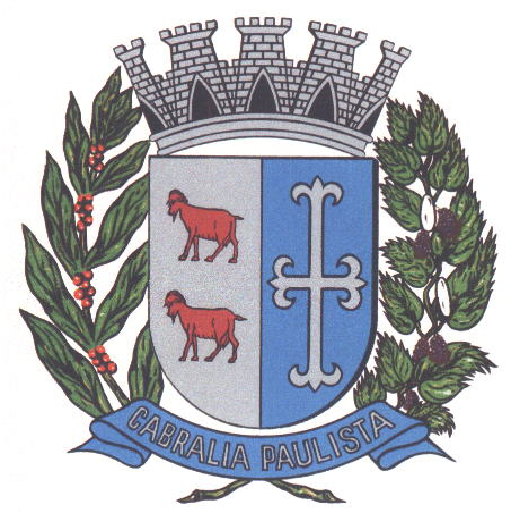
- Flag Coat of arms

- Location in São Paulo state

- Location in Brazil
- Coordinates: 22°27′20″S 49°20′15″W
- Country: Brazil
- Region: Southeast
- State: São Paulo

Area
  - Total: 240 km^{2} (93 sq mi)

Population (2020)
  - Total: 4,243
  - Density: 18/km^{2} (46/sq mi)
- Time zone: UTC−3 (BRT)

Cabrália Paulista is a municipality in the state of São Paulo in Brazil. The population is 4,243 (2020 est.) in an area of 240 km^{2}. The elevation is 539 m.

== History ==
The municipality was created by state law in 1948.

Map of the state of São Paulo (1948).

== Demographics ==
Historical population (municipality)
Year	Population	%±
1950	4,623	—
1960	4,409	−4.6%
1970	3,259	−26.1%
1980	3,447	5.8%
1991	3,862	12.0%
2000	4,656	20.6%
2010	4,365	−6.2%
2022	4,299	−1.5%

== Media ==
In telecommunications, the city was served by Companhia Telefônica Brasileira until 1973, when it began to be served by Telecomunicações de São Paulo. In July 1998, this company was acquired by Telefónica, which adopted the Vivo brand in 2012.

The company is currently an operator of cell phones, fixed lines, internet (fiber optics/4G) and television (satellite and cable).

== See also ==
- List of municipalities in São Paulo
