= Borebi =

Municipality in the state of São Paulo in Brazil

- Municipality
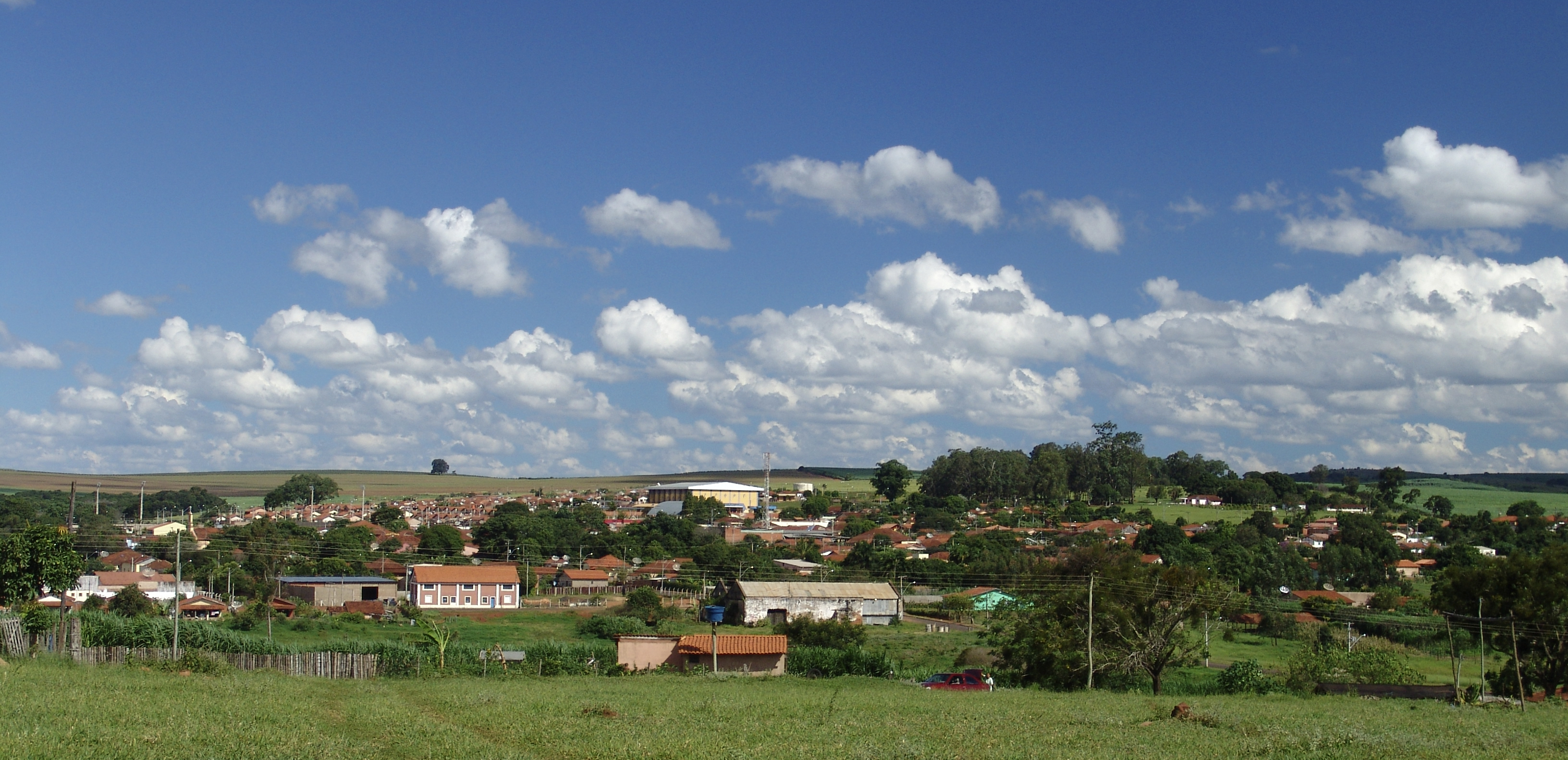

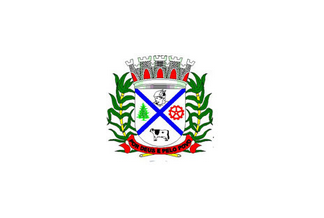
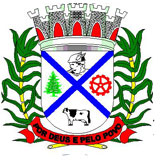
- Flag Coat of arms

- Location in São Paulo state

- Location in Brazil
- Coordinates: 22°34′10″S 48°56′18″W
- Country: Brazil
- Region: Southeast
- State: São Paulo

Area
  - Total: 348 km^{2} (134 sq mi)

Population (2020)
  - Total: 2,683
  - Density: 7.71/km^{2} (20.0/sq mi)
- Time zone: UTC−3 (BRT)

Borebi is a municipality in the state of São Paulo in Brazil. The population is 2,683 (2020 est.) in an area of 348 km^{2}. The elevation is 590m.

== Demographics ==
Historical population (municipality)
Year	Population	%±
2000	1,933	—
2010	2,293	18.6%
2022	2,713	18.3%

== Media ==
In telecommunications, the city was served by Telecomunicações de São Paulo. In July 1998, this company was acquired by Telefónica, which adopted the Vivo brand in 2012. The company is currently an operator of cell phones, fixed lines, internet (fiber optics/4G) and television (satellite and cable).

== See also ==
- List of municipalities in São Paulo
