= Buraco do Padre =

Waterfall in Paraná, Brazil

Coordinates: 22°54′09″S 43°16′06″W

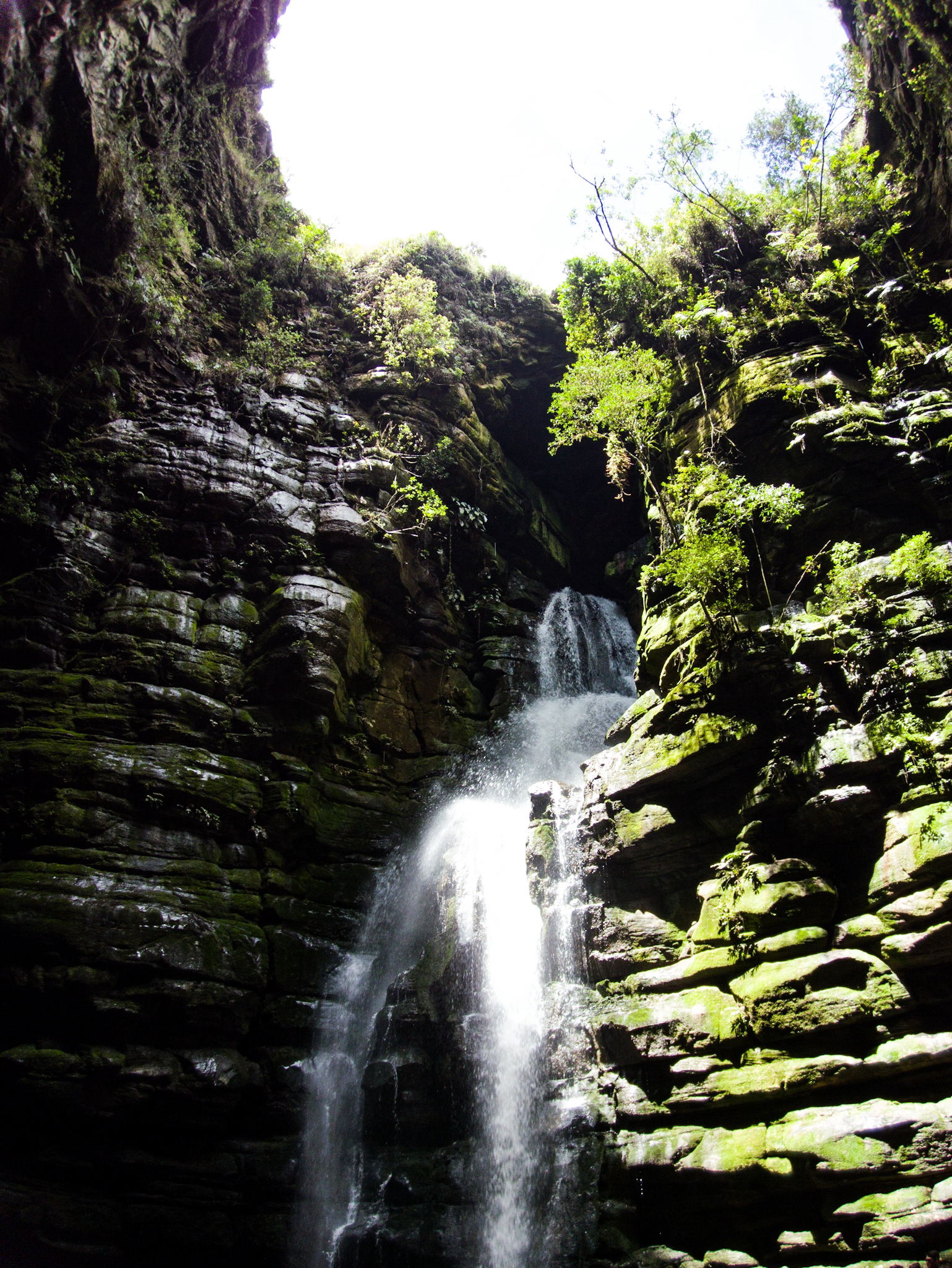
Waterfall of Buraco do Padre waterfall

Buraco do Padre or the Priest's Gorge is a waterfall and geological formation in the state of Parana, Brazil. It is located east-southeast of the city of Ponta Grossa.

== Location ==
It is located within the Campos Gerais National Park, on the eastern edge of the Paraná Basin, approximately 24 km east/southeast of the city of Ponta Grossa, district of Itaiacoca. It is a cave that occurs at the intersection of geological faults and fractures that cut the sandstone rocks of the Furnas Formation. These faults and fractures caused underground erosion of the sandstone. Access to the interior of the cave is via the bed of the Quebra-Pedra River, with the occurrence of an imposing waterfall. Within Buraco do Padre there are notable exposures of sandstones of the Furnas Formation, with their typical cross-stratifications and plane-parallel.

This breathtaking site is part of a National Park operated by Águia Florestal (Eagle Forest), a public forestry company working in partnership with the University Group for Speleological Research (GUPE) since 2019. Your journey begins with a scenic 880-meter walk along an easy and peaceful trail that leads you to the mouth of the cave, where a crystal-clear underground river flows out into the open. The cave itself needs no artificial lighting—its massive entrance allows natural daylight to illuminate your path, creating a mysterious yet magical atmosphere. Best of all, the visit is self-guided and already included in your park entrance ticket, so you can explore at your own pace and soak in the natural beauty around you.

== History ==
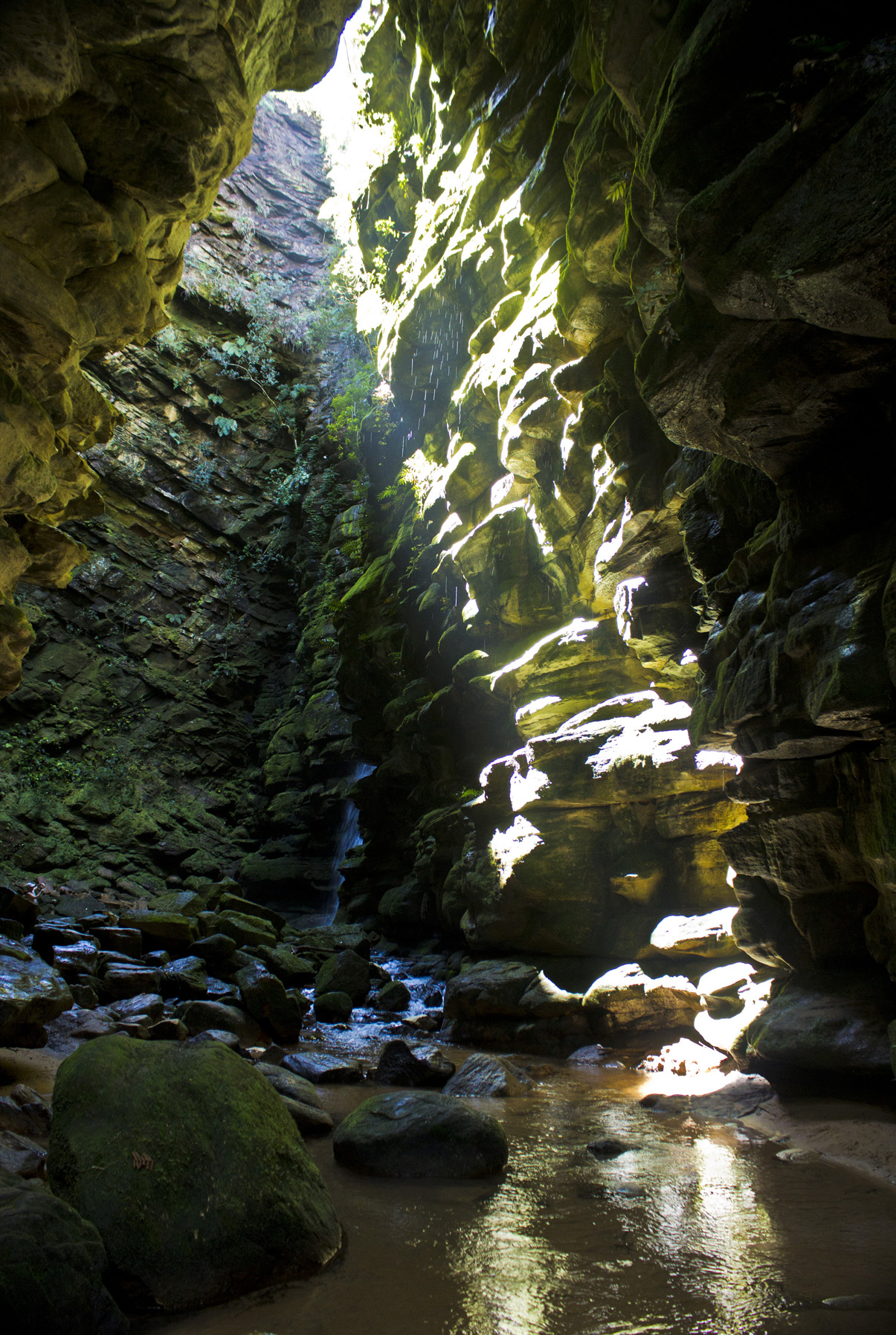
Priest's Hole - Ponta Grossa - PR

The name Buraco do Padre or the Priest's Gorge is believed to come from Jesuit priests in the 17th or 18th century who used the site for meditation or retreat. It is also believed to be a refuge for the Jesuits, owners of the Pitangui land that also housed the old troop trail. Another belief is that the name was given by the caboclos and tropeiros who passed through there. Some oral traditions suggest that Jesuits may have used it as a hiding or resting place while traveling inland to evangelize Indigenous populations.

Long before the arrival of Jesuits, the area was inhabited by Indigenous groups, likely from the Kaingang or Guarani peoples. While no major archaeological discoveries have been made at the cave itself, the broader region has yielded stone tools and pottery, indicating pre-Columbian occupation.

Since 2002, it has been one of the Brazilian geological sites, as defined by the Brazilian Commission of Geological and Paleobiological Sites. In 2005, it became part of the newly created Campos Gerais National Park.

Access to the site is via the Talco Highway (PR 513).

== See also ==
- Campos Gerais National Park
- Vila Velha State Park
- Formação Furnas
