= Vila Velha State Park =

State park in Paraná, Brazil

- Parque Estadual de Vila Velha
- IUCN category II (national park)
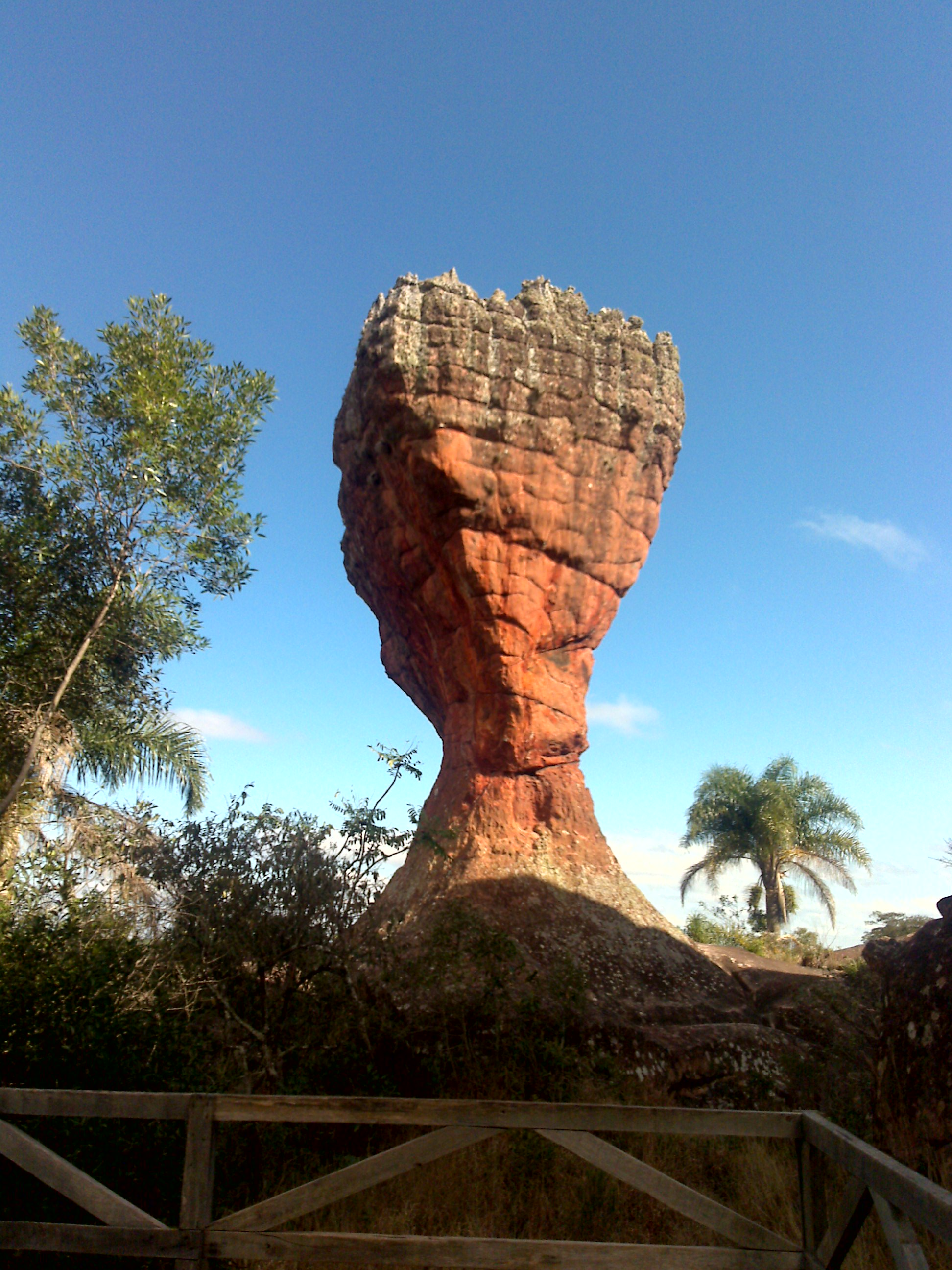
- Vila Velha (Goblet)

- Location within Brazil
- Nearest city: Ponta Grossa, Paraná
- Coordinates: 25.238°S 50.011°W
- Area: 3,803 hectares (9,400 acres)
- Designation: State park
- Created: 24 September 1990

Vila Velha State Park or the Old Village State Park (Portuguese: Parque Estadual de Vila Velha) is a state park in the city of Ponta Grossa, Paraná State, Brazil. It covers 3,803 hectares (9,400 acres). It is located at one hundred kilometers from Curitiba, capital of the State of Paraná. The set of formations resembles a medieval city with its castles and towers in ruins, hence its name.

== The Park ==
Created by the Department of Historical and Artistic Heritage of the State of Paraná in 1966, to protect its 18 km² of rock formations, classified as one of the Brazilian geological sites by SIGEP, due to its impressive natural sculptures, sculpted by wind and rain erosion in the sandstones of the Itararé Group.

Composed of three neighboring sites: Arenitos; Furnas and Lagoa Dourada.

While the sandstones are a huge collection of large blocks carved into exotic shapes, the Furnas are three craters with vertical walls, eroded into the ground, the largest of which is about 100 meters deep, half of which is covered by water. They are all connected to each other and to Lagoa Dourada, so named because of the effect created by the crystal-clear water and the color of its sands in the sunsets.

=== Rock formations ===
Some of the formations were named after animals such as the "Turtle" or the "Camel", or shapes such as the "Cup", the symbol of Vila Velha; the "Boot"; the "Sphinx"; the "Indian Head"; there are also stone walls that resemble castle walls, towers of different shapes and heights, as well as cracks whose internal shape resembles bottles and rocks balanced between walls.

== Geological formation ==
The sandstone formation of Vila Velha dates back to the Carboniferous period (approximately 340 million years ago), when the inland sea that existed in the area began to drain, exposing the sandy material that ended up cemented with iron oxide (hence the reddish color).

In the following millennia, the terrain gradually rose and was slowly eroded by the action of winds and rain that acted on the most fragile areas of the rocks, wearing them down differently and even isolating them into several blocks.

== See also ==
- Iguaçu National Park
- Buraco do Padre
- Formação Furnas
- Campos Gerais National Park
