= Isbrueckerichthys calvus =

Conservation status
- Least Concern (IUCN 3.1)

Scientific classification
- Kingdom: Animalia
- Phylum: Chordata
- Class: Actinopterygii
- Order: Siluriformes
- Family: Loricariidae
- Genus: Isbrueckerichthys
- Species: I. calvus

Binomial name
- Isbrueckerichthys calvus Jerep, Shibatta, E. H. L. Pereira & Oyakawa, 2006

Species of fish

Isbrueckerichthys calvus is a species of freshwater ray-finned fish belonging to the family Loricariidae, the suckermouth armored catfishes, and the subfamily Hypoptopomatinae. the cascudinhos. This catfish is endemic to Brazil where it is known only from tributaries of the Taquara River in the basin of the Tibagi River, in the states of São Paulo and Paraná. This species reaches a standard length of 9 cm (3.5 in).
