= Lampiella =

Conservation status
- Near Threatened (IUCN 3.1)

Scientific classification
- Kingdom: Animalia
- Phylum: Chordata
- Class: Actinopterygii
- Order: Siluriformes
- Family: Loricariidae
- Genus: Lampiella; Isbrücker, 2001
- Species: L. gibbosa

Binomial name
- Lampiella gibbosa (Miranda-Ribeiro, 1908)

Synonyms
- Otocinclus gibbosus Miranda Ribeiro, 1908

Genus of fishes

Lampiella gibbosa is a monospecific genus of freshwater ray-finned fish belonging to the family Loricariidae, the suckermouth armoured catfishes, and the subfamily Hypoptopomatinae, the cascudinhos. The only species in the genus is Lampiella gibbosa, a actfish which is endemic to Brazil where it is only known from the drainages of the Pilões, Iporanga and Betari, all tributaries of the Ribeira de Iguape River in São Paulo state. This species reaches a total length of 5 cm (2.0 in).

The genus Lampiella Isbrücker 2001 was named in honor of Isbrücker's grandmother, Céline Lampie (1886-1943), who was murdered at the German extermination camp in Sobibor, Poland, She was “a small woman with a small humpback” (translation), alluding to the humpbacked shape of Lampiella gibbosa.
