= Isbrueckerichthys =

Scientific classification
- Kingdom: Animalia
- Phylum: Chordata
- Class: Actinopterygii
- Division: Teleostei
- Order: Siluriformes
- Family: Loricariidae
- Subfamily: Hypoptopomatinae
- Genus: Isbrueckerichthys; Derijst, 1996

Type species
- Hemipsilichthys duseni A. Miranda-Ribeiro, 1907

Genus of fishes

Isbrueckerichthys is a genus of freshwater ray-finned fish belonging to the family Loricariidae, the suckermouth armored catfishes, and the subfamily Hypoptopomatinae. the cascudinhos. The catfishes in this genus are endemic to Brazil.

== Taxonomy ==
Isbrueckerichthys was erected in 1996 by Eddy Derijst for Pareiorhaphis duseni and Pareiorhaphis alipionis, which were transferred to the new genus because they were not closely related to the type species of their previous genus, Pareiorhaphis. I. epakmos was described in 2003. I. calvus and I. saxicola were described in 2006.

== Species ==
There are currently five recognized species in this genus:

- Isbrueckerichthys alipionis (Gosline, 1947)
- Isbrueckerichthys calvus Jerep, Shibatta, E. H. L. Pereira & Oyakawa, 2006
- Isbrueckerichthys duseni (A. Miranda-Ribeiro, 1907)
- Isbrueckerichthys epakmos E. H. L. Pereira & Oyakawa, 2003
- Isbrueckerichthys saxicola Jerep, Shibatta, E. H. L. Pereira & Oyakawa, 2006

== Distribution ==
Three species of Isbrueckerichthys are thought to be endemic to the Ribeira de Iguape River basin: I. duseni from the upper reaches of that basin in Paraná State, I. alipionis from the Betari River, a tributary of rio Ribeira de Iguape, and I. epakmos from a tributary of the Juquiá River in São Paulo State. Both I. calvus and I. saxicola were collected in headwater streams of Tibagi River of the Paranapanema River basin in Paraná State of Brazil. I. saxicola is only known from the headwater of ribeirão Jacutinga, in low Tibagi River basin. I. calvus is only known from córrego Juruba and ribeirão Água dos Oito, affluents of the Taquara River of the Tibagi River basin.

== Description ==
Isbrueckerichthys is composed of small- to medium-sized species up to 90.2 millimetres (3.55 in) SL. These fish have a dorsal fin with one spine and seven branched rays, and a caudal peduncle ovoid in cross-section.

Isbrueckerichthys alipionis is the only species in which the teeth of the dentary and premaxilla are without a lateral cusp. I. epakmos is the only species in which mature males have a clump of hypertrophied odontodes only on the anterior portion of snout; in the other species, odontodes are also present on the lateral margins of the head. The most distinctive features of I. epakmos are the anterior portion of head ornamented with a large and rugose soft fleshy area and the presence of a clump of hypertrophied odontodes located only on anterior portion of snout, usually short and thick, directed forward or slightly upward on adult males. I. duseni has a short pectoral fin spine and a long caudal peduncle (over a third of the body length), while the remaining two species, I. calvus and I. saxicola, have long pectoral fin spines and a short caudal peduncle (about a quarter to less than a third of the body length). I saxicola exhibits minute abdominal platelets with much more than six odontodes, a plated area under the first three plates of the lateral line, an exposed portion of cleithrum bordering all the posterior margin of the opercular opening on lateral side of the body, and an exposed surface of supraoccipital flat or slightly convex. On the other hand, I. calvus has minute abdominal platelets with at most six odontodes, a nude area under the first three plates of the lateral line, an unexposed cleithrum, or when exposed, bordering just the superior portion of posterior margin of the opercular opening on lateral side of the body, and an exposed surface of supraoccipital strongly convex, with an area without odontodes at the center.

== Ecology ==
Species of this genus are commonly found in small to medium headwater streams with clear, fast running, and well-oxygenated water, where the bottom is composed of rocks, boulders, and sometimes gravel. They are not tolerant to polluted or not oxygenated waters.

The holotype of I. epakmos is from the Verde River; it is a small stream with clear water and moderate to strong current, with loose stones and, in some places, sand on the bottom.

The type locality of I. saxicola is a small creek located near the urban area of Londrina city, flowing through a landscape of mixed open fields and riparian vegetation, sometimes with a very degraded margin. Grass or other vegetation is usually present on the margins. The stream bottom is rocky, with small to medium-sized rocks, loose stones and gravel; sometimes with sand and mud on the small pools bottom. The water is clear to turbid and moderate to strong flowing. The fishes are usually found on the bottom among rocks and stones.

The type locality where some specimens of I calvus were collected is a small creek of rural region, flowing through a landscape of mixed open field, riparian vegetation and forest, sometimes with a very degraded margin. Like in the habitat of I. saxicola, vegetation is usually present on the margins, and the stream bottom is similar. The fishes were usually found along the bottom among rocks and stones, just under small waterfalls.
