= Isbrueckerichthys duseni =

Conservation status
- Least Concern (IUCN 3.1)

Scientific classification
- Kingdom: Animalia
- Phylum: Chordata
- Class: Actinopterygii
- Order: Siluriformes
- Family: Loricariidae
- Genus: Isbrueckerichthys
- Species: I. duseni

Binomial name
- Isbrueckerichthys duseni (A. Miranda-Ribeiro, 1907)

Synonyms
- Hemipsilichthys duseni Miranda-Ribeiri, 1907; Pareiorhaphis duseni (Miranda-Ribeiri, 1907)

Species of fish

Isbrueckerichthys duseni is a species of freshwater ray-finned fish belonging to the family Loricariidae, the suckermouth armored catfishes, and the subfamily Hypoptopomatinae. the cascudinhos. This catfish is endemic to Brazil where it occurs in the upper Ribeira de Iguape River, in the state of Paraná, although the species has also been recorded from rivers in the state of São Paulo and the . This species reaches a standard length of 9.9 cm (3.9 in). The specific name honors the Swedish engineer, explorer and botanist Per Karl Hjalmar Dusén, the collector of the holotype.
