= Isbrueckerichthys epakmos =

Conservation status
- Least Concern (IUCN 3.1)

Scientific classification
- Kingdom: Animalia
- Phylum: Chordata
- Class: Actinopterygii
- Order: Siluriformes
- Family: Loricariidae
- Genus: Isbrueckerichthys
- Species: I. epakmos

Binomial name
- Isbrueckerichthys epakmos E. H. L. Pereira & Oyakawa, 2003

Species of fish

Isbrueckerichthys epakmos is a species of freshwater ray-finned fish belonging to the family Loricariidae, the suckermouth armored catfishes, and the subfamily Hypoptopomatinae. the cascudinhos. This catfish is endemic to Brazil where it has been recorded from the Ribeira de Iguape River basin, in the states of São Paulo and Paraná. This species reaches a standard length of 10.3 cm (4.1 in).
