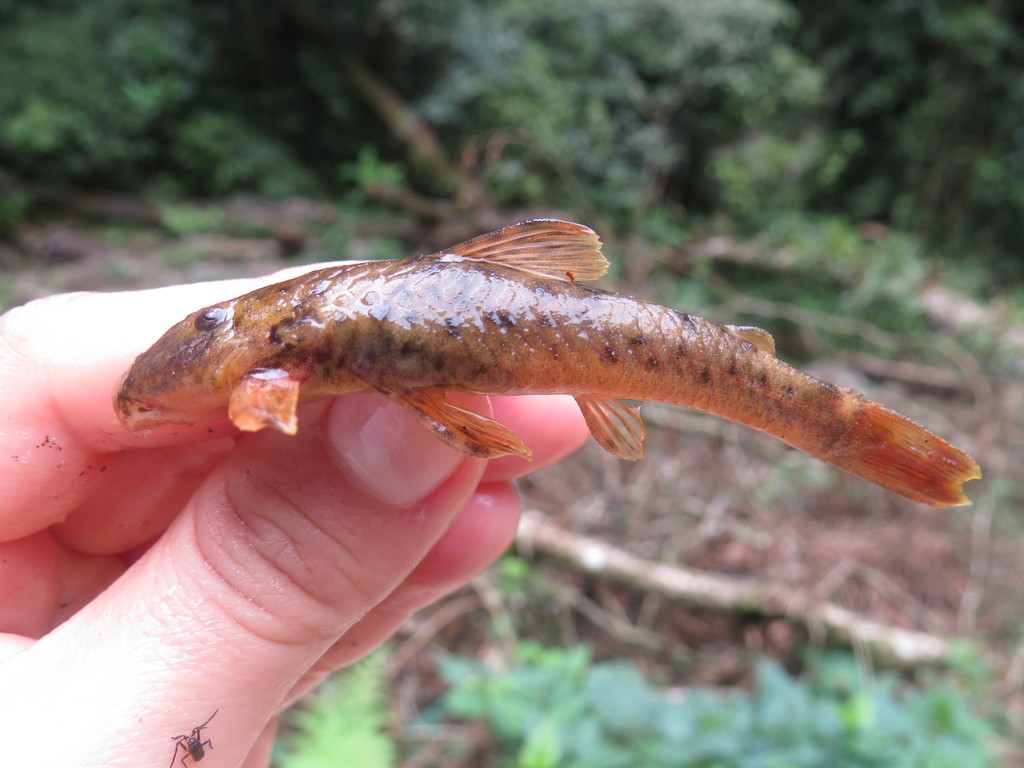
- Kornichthys heylandi

Scientific classification
- Kingdom: Animalia
- Phylum: Chordata
- Class: Actinopterygii
- Order: Siluriformes
- Family: Loricariidae
- Subfamily: Hypoptopomatinae
- Genus: Kronichthys; A. Miranda-Ribeiro, 1908

Type species
- Kronichthys subteres A. Miranda-Ribeiro, 1908

= Kronichthys =

Genus of fishes

Kronichthys is a genus of freshwater ray-finned fishes belonging to the family Loricariidae, the mailed catfishes, and the subfamily Hypoptopomatinae, the cascudinhos. The catfishes in this genus are endemic to Brazil.

The genus is named in honor of the German-born Brazilian pharmacist and naturalist Sigismund Ernst Richard (Ricardo) Krone, who collected the holotype# of the type species.

== Species ==
There are currently three recognized species in this genus:

- Kronichthys heylandi (Boulenger, 1900)
- Kronichthys lacerta (Nichols, 1919)
- Kronichthys subteres A. Miranda-Ribeiro, 1908

== Description ==
Kronichthys species are small, cylindrical fishes similar to the hypoptopomatine Schizolecis. The color pattern is dark brown with a slight mottling or four dorsal saddles, and the abdomen mostly white. The dorsal fin is short and the adipose fin is small.
