= Isbrueckerichthys alipionis =

Conservation status
- Least Concern (IUCN 3.1)

Scientific classification
- Kingdom: Animalia
- Phylum: Chordata
- Class: Actinopterygii
- Order: Siluriformes
- Family: Loricariidae
- Genus: Isbrueckerichthys
- Species: I. alipionis

Binomial name
- Isbrueckerichthys alipionis (Gosline, 1947)

Synonyms
- Pareiorhaphis alipionis Gosline, 1947

Species of fish

Isbrueckerichthys alipionis is a species of freshwater ray-finned fish belonging to the family Loricariidae, the suckermouth armored catfishes, and the subfamily Hypoptopomatinae. the cascudinhos. This catfish is endemic to Brazil where it is known only from the basin of the Ribeira de Iguape River, in the states of São Paulo and Paraná. This species reaches a standard length of 8.2 cm (3.2 in). The specific name honors the Brazilian ichthyologist and herpetologist Alipio de Miranda Ribeiro.
