= Kronichthys subteres =

Conservation status
- Least Concern (IUCN 3.1)

Scientific classification
- Kingdom: Animalia
- Phylum: Chordata
- Class: Actinopterygii
- Order: Siluriformes
- Family: Loricariidae
- Genus: Kronichthys
- Species: K. subteres

Binomial name
- Kronichthys subteres A. Miranda-Ribeiro, 1908

Species of fish

Kronichthys subteres is a species of freshwater ray-finned fish belonging to the family Loricariidae, the suckermouth armored catfishes, and the subfamily Hypoptopomatinae. the cascudinhos. This catfish is endemic to Brazil where it occurs in the Ribeira de Iguape River basin in the states of Paraná and São Paulo. This species grows to a total length of 12 cm (4.7 in).

Kronichthys subteres inhabits streams with rocky and sandy bottom. This species forages both during the day and at night, grazing on microscopic algae, mostly diatoms and green algae growing on rocks and submersed vegetation. They occasionally take chironomid and simuliid larvae, as well as tiny crustaceans. Before grazing on a patch with dense sediment, the fish makes wiggling head-down movements which raise sediment, which is blown away by the water current. When grazing algae off the substrate, the fish makes vigorous mouth movements, and moves by jerky movements probably related to its mouth making alternate grazing and attaching to the substrate. K. subteres leaves conspicuous grazing marks on exposed rocks. These fish may re-graze a given spot by moving backwards.
