= Kronichthys lacerta =

Conservation status
- Least Concern (IUCN 3.1)

Scientific classification
- Kingdom: Animalia
- Phylum: Chordata
- Class: Actinopterygii
- Order: Siluriformes
- Family: Loricariidae
- Genus: Kronichthys
- Species: K. lacerta

Binomial name
- Kronichthys lacerta (Nichols, 1919)

Synonyms
- Plecostomus lacerta Nichols, 1919

Species of fish

Kronichthys lacerta is a species of freshwater ray-finned fish belonging to the family Loricariidae, the suckermouth armored catfishes, and the subfamily Hypoptopomatinae. the cascudinhos. This catfish is endemic to Brazil where it occurs in coastal streams draining into Paranaguá Bay and in the Ribeira de Iguape River basin, in the states of Paraná and São Paulo. This species grows to a total length of 15 cm (5.9 in).
