= Ribeira de Iguape River =

River in Brazil

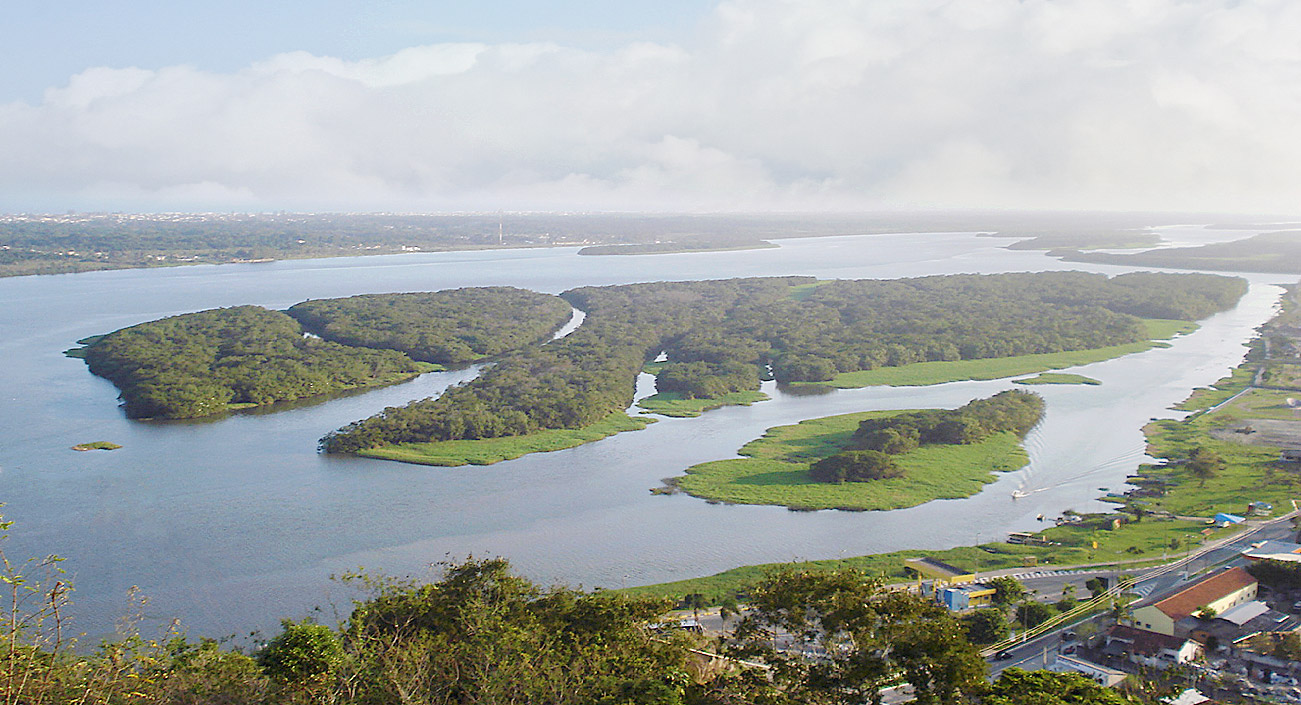

- Location within Brazil
- Native name: Rio Ribeira de Iguape (Portuguese)

Location
- Country: Brazil

Physical characteristics
- Source
  - location: Paraná state
  - coordinates: 24.905965°S 49.471624°W
- Mouth
  - location: Atlantic Ocean
  - coordinates: 24.669319°S 47.412951°W
- Length: 470 kilometres (290 mi)

Basin features
- Tributaries
  - left: Una da Aldeia River

The Ribeira de Iguape River (Portuguese: Rio Ribeira de Iguape), or simply the Ribeira River (Note: Some maps show the name as "Rio Ribeira" in the upper reaches and "Rio Ribeira de Iguape" in the lower reaches. Others use "Rio Ribeira de Iguape" for the full length of the river in Paraná and São Paulo.) (Portuguese: Rio Ribeira), is a river of Paraná and São Paulo states in southeastern Brazil. It flows into the Atlantic Ocean near Iguape. The river is home to several endemic species of fish. So far no dams have been built on the river, although four have been proposed. Although it flows through a relatively sparsely populated region with untouched areas of Atlantic Forest, the river has been contaminated with heavy metals from mining beyond the point where it is considered safe to eat the molluscs found in the river and its estuary.

== Course ==
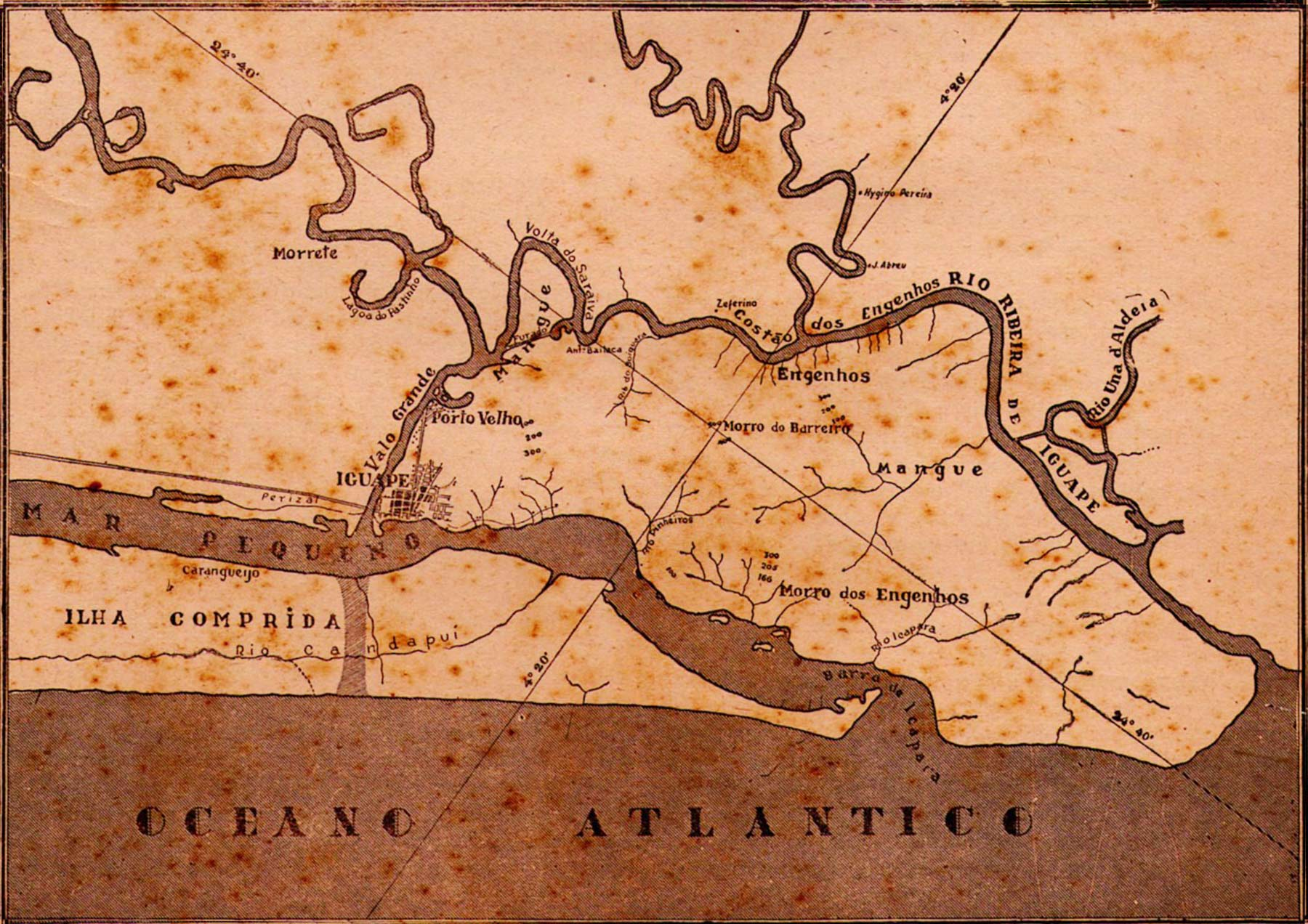
1930 map showing the Valo Grande canal near the river's mouth

The Ribeira de Iguape River is 470 kilometres (290 mi) long, and is the largest in São Paulo to have no dams along its length. It forms at the confluence of the Ribeirinha River and the Açunguí River in the state of Paraná less than 100 kilometres (62 mi) from Curitiba. The elevation at its origin is about 1,000 metres (3,300 ft). The main source is in the Campos Gerais National Park. About 120 kilometres (75 mi) of the river is in the state of Paraná. Major tributaries of the river in Sao Paulo are the Juquiá, São Lourenço, Itariri River, Una da Aldeia, Pardo and Jacupiranga.

In its upper course the Ribeira de Iguape runs through the mountains of the Serra do Mar, and has turbulent waters that are popular for rafting. In the first 290 kilometres (180 mi) it drops about 900 metres (3,000 ft) through the mountains to the region near Itapeuna. From there it descends 90 metres (300 ft) in 90 kilometres (56 mi) to the city of Registro, where it is only 5 metres (16 ft) above sea level, although still 70 kilometres (43 mi) from its mouth.

From the port town of Registro the river flows quietly through the coastal plain, reaching the Atlantic Ocean in Barra do Ribeira near Iguape, São Paulo. It is navigable along this section. Near the river mouth, some of the water does not flow directly into the sea but is diverted by the Valo Grande canal into the Mar Pequeno between the mainland and the Ilha Comprida.

The coastal plain at the mouth of the river is usually considered to have been created by shallow marine sedimentation in the last two inter-glacial periods, but has also been proposed as an ocean delta of the river. An analysis of soils has shown that there was never a true delta.

The Vale do Ribeira region, which holds the Ribeira River Basin and the Iguape-Cananéia-Paranaguá estuary lagoon complex, has an area of 2,830,666 hectares (6,994,730 acres), of which 1,119,133 hectares (2,765,440 acres) is in the state of Paraná and 1,711,533 hectares (4,229,290 acres) is in the state of Sao Paulo. The estuary lagoon complex includes the coastal basins of Vertente Marítima Sul in the municipalities of Cananéia and Ilha Comprida and Vertente Marítima Norte in the municipality of Iguape. The Vale do Ribeira was declared a World Heritage Site in 1999.

== Dam proposal ==
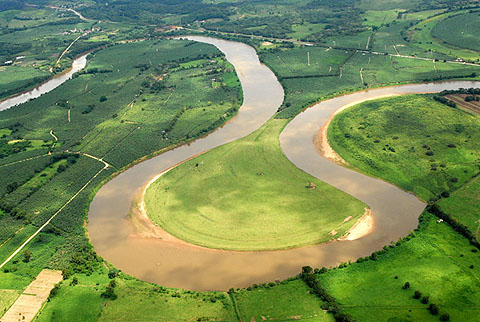
The river near Sete Barras

There are proposals to build four hydroelectric dams on the river, but these are opposed by the residents. At the end of the 1980s the Companhia Brasileira de Alumínio (CBA) was authorized to use the river to produce electricity for its plant through building the Tijuco Alto Dam between the cities of Adrianópolis, Paraná and Ribeira, São Paulo. The two state licenses were annulled in 1994 through a public civil action that argued that the Ribeira de Iguape was a federal river, and only the Brazilian Institute of Environment and Renewable Natural Resources (IBAMA) could authorise the dam. The company prepared an environmental impact study for IBAMA, which was rejected in 2003. They prepared a fresh study, submitted in October 2005. The company had already built 8 or 9 dams in the river basin, including seven in the Juquiá River.

Four dams were being considered in June 2006, which would flood an area of 11,000 hectares (27,000 acres) in total. The other three were the Funil, Itaoca and Batatal dams in the middle and upper Ribeira. Quilombola communities in the affected areas had mobilized to form the Committee of the Campaign Against the Dams of the River Ribeira de Iguape. They asserted that the constitution gave them ownership of their land, and the dams could not be built without their permission. Risks included the loss of land suitable for farming or pasturage, changes to the biological dynamics of the river, and the potential for flooding of several lead mines that could release waste into the river.

== Environment ==
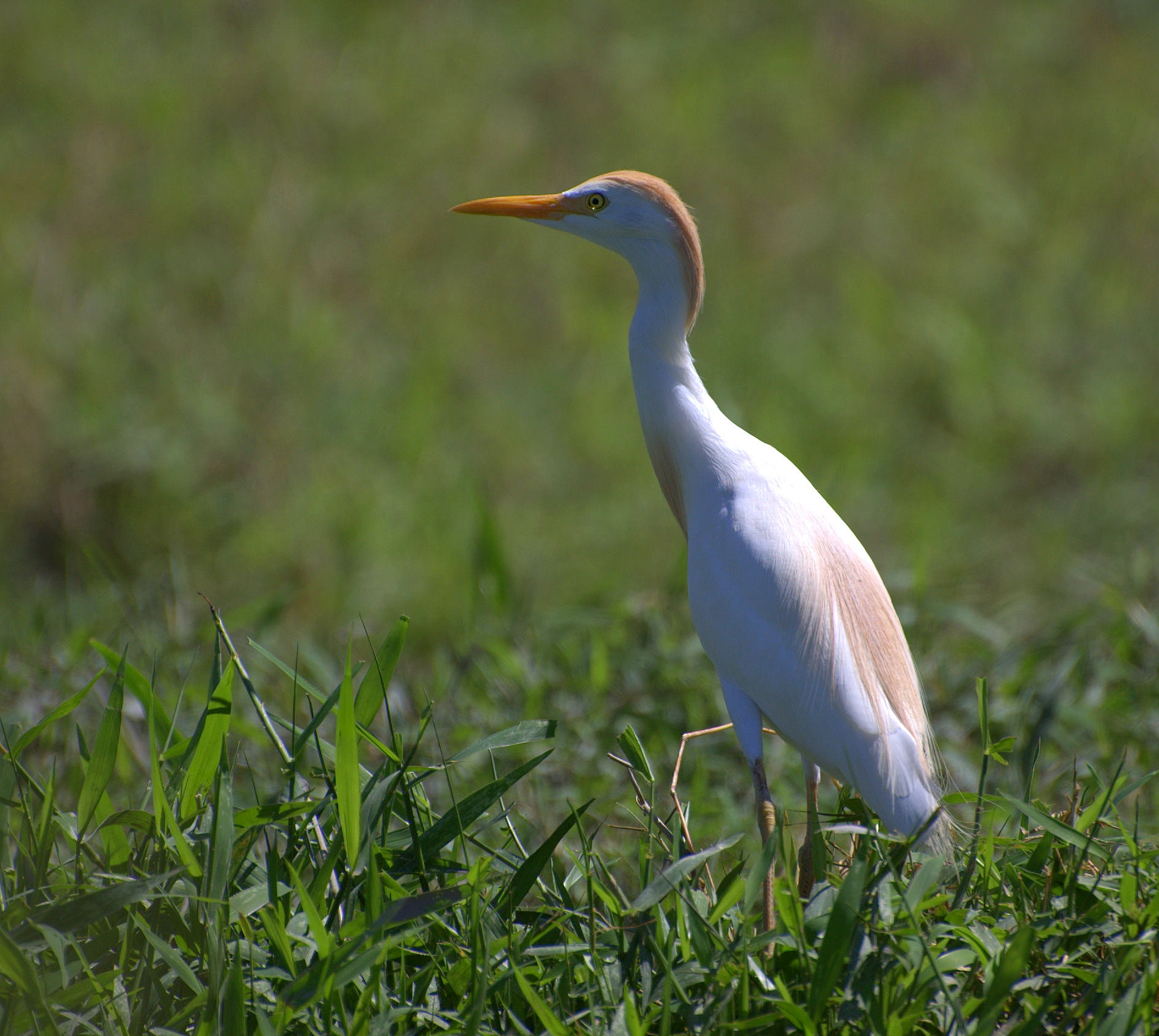
Cattle egret (Bubulcus ibis) on the river bank near Registro

The region has a warm tropical climate with mild winters, hot summers and high rainfall. Through most of its length the Ribeira de Iguape flows through relatively under-populated agricultural country with large areas of Atlantic Forest. However, the river has been degraded by human activities and deforestation is continuing.

The Pimelodella kronei is an endemic troglobitic fish species, exclusively subterranean, found in cave streams along the Betari River basin, a tributary of the upper Ribeira de Iguape River. Three species of Isbrueckerichthys are thought to be endemic to the Ribeira de Iguape basin: Isbrueckerichthys duseni from the upper reaches of that basin in Paraná State, Isbrueckerichthys alipionis from the Betari River and Isbrueckerichthys epakmos from a tributary of the Juquiá River in São Paulo State. Other endemic fish species include Harttia kronei, Kronichthys lacerta, Kronichthys subteres, Lampiella gibbosa, Neoplecostomus ribeirensis and Otothyris juquiae.

The river has been polluted by companies refining and smelting lead and silver ores in the upper Vale do Ribeira. Sediments contain high levels of heavy metals such as lead and zinc. They come both from the mining residue, which was thrown into the river for about forty years, and from the metallurgy slag, which had been considered to be insert. In 2007 sediments on sandbanks, in the water, on the river bottom and in the Iguape-Cananéia estuary system at the river mouth all had levels above that defined as requiring intervention by the Canadian Council of Ministers of the Environment. Molluscs eaten by the people of the region show heavy metal levels above the level considered acceptable.

In June 2013 twelve families had to be removed from their homes in the town of Eldorado when the river overflowed. In January 2014 a spill of an oily substance was detected moving down the river near the Itaoca municipality, which had been hit by a storm in which five people and died and about 20 were missing. Civil Defense alerted all municipalities to take preventative measures, and warned that people should not drink the river water until the spill had dissipated. The water, fauna, flora and soil were contaminated by the spill. which had caused fish to die. In January 2016 heavy rain caused the river to flood in Registro, making 350 homeless in the city.

Conservation units in the region include the Alto Ribeira Tourist State Park, Ilha do Cardoso State Park, Jacupiranga State Park and Juréia-Itatins Ecological Station. The Instituto Socioambiental's Vale do Ribeira Program promotes sustainable development in the Ribeira de Iguape River Basin and the Iguape-Cananéia-Paranaguá Estuary/Lagoon Complex. It works with local quilombola associations, municipal governments and civil society organizations.

== See also ==
- List of rivers of São Paulo
- List of rivers of Paraná

== Sources ==
- Almeida, Camilo Aparecido (5 October 2011), "Fotos do Rio Ribeira de Iguape no Vale do Ribeira", O Vale do Ribeira (in Portuguese)
- Almeida, Camilo Aparecido (26 January 2012), "Bacia Hidrográfica do Rio Ribeira de Iguape", O Vale do Ribeira
- "Cetesb confirma que produto oleoso vazou no Rio Ribeira após enchente", G1 Globo (in Portuguese), 13 January 2014
- Guill, Ana Luiza Feigol (1987), Ecologia populacional do bagre cego de Iporanga, Pimelodella kronei (Siluriformes: Heptateridae), do Vale do Alto Ribeira, Iporanga - SP: uma comparação com Trajano (in Portuguese), Biblioteca Digital
- Froese, Rainer; Pauly, Daniel, eds. (2011), FishBase. December 2011 version
- Jerep, Fernando C.; Shibatta, Oscar A.; Pereira, Edson H. L.; Oyakawa, Osvaldo T. (2006), "Two new species of Isbrueckerichthys Derijst, 1996 (Siluriformes: Loricariidae) from the rio Paranapanema basin, Brazil" (PDF), Zootaxa, 1372: 53–68
- Mapa Rodoviário São Paulo (PDF), Ministério dos Transportes, 2002
- Moraes, Aline (18 June 2007), "Sedimentos do rio Ribeira de Iguape têm altos teores de metais pesados", Agência USP de Notícias (in Portuguese), São Paulo: Universidade de São Paulo
- Pereira, Edson H. L.; Oyakawa, Osvaldo T. (2003), "Isbrueckerichthys epakmos, a new species of loricariid catfish from the rio Ribeira de Iguape basin, Brazil (Teleostei: Siluriformes)" (PDF), Neotropical Ichthyology, 1 (1): 3–9, doi:10.1590/S1679-62252003000100001, archived from the original (PDF) on 2007-02-21
- "Rio Ribeira (PR/SP)", Brasil das Águas (in Portuguese), Safari Air Empreendimentos Ltda
- "Rio Ribeira de Iguape transborda e famílias ficam desalojadas", G1 Globo (in Portuguese), 26 June 2013
- Rossi, Mariane (14 January 2016), "Rio Ribeira transborda e deixa mais de 200 desabrigados em Registro, SP", G1 Globo (in Portuguese)
- Sugimoto, Luis (June 2006), "Em defesa de um grande rio que ainda corre livre", SALA DE IMPRENSA, Universidade Estadual de Campinas
- Suguio, Kenitiro; Rodrigues, Roberto Barbosa; Silva, Denise dos Santos (April 2012), "Existe um verdadeiro delta na foz do rio Ribeira de Iguape, São Paulo?", Geologia USP. Série Científica, 12 (1), São Paulo, ISSN 2316-9095
- Unidade de Conservação: Parque Nacional dos Campos Gerais (in Portuguese), MMA: Ministério do Meio Ambiente
- Vale do Ribeira (in Portuguese), ISA: Instituto Socioambiental
