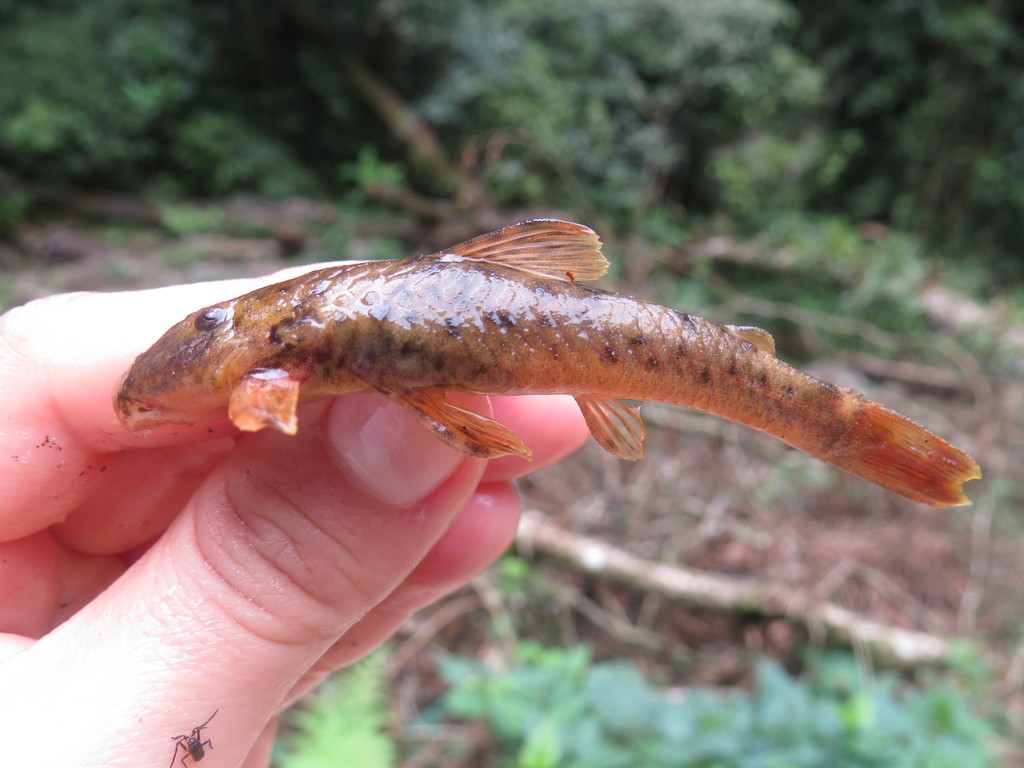

Conservation status
- Least Concern (IUCN 3.1)

Scientific classification
- Kingdom: Animalia
- Phylum: Chordata
- Class: Actinopterygii
- Order: Siluriformes
- Family: Loricariidae
- Genus: Kronichthys
- Species: K. heylandi

Binomial name
- Kronichthys heylandi (Boulenger, 1900)

Synonyms
- Plecostomus heylandi Boulenger, 1900

= Kronichthys heylandi =

Species of fish

Kronichthys heylandi is a species of freshwater ray-finned fish belonging to the family Loricariidae, the suckermouth armored catfishes, and the subfamily Hypoptopomatinae. the cascudinhos. This catfish is endemic to Brazil where it occurs in coastal streams between Santos and Rio de Janeiro. This species grows to a total length of 15 cm (5.9 in).

The fish is named in honor of the collector of the holotype, the British civil engineer Herbert K. Heyland. who subsequently presented the specimen to the British Museum.
