= Isbrueckerichthys saxicola =

Conservation status
- Critically Endangered (IUCN 3.1)

Scientific classification
- Kingdom: Animalia
- Phylum: Chordata
- Class: Actinopterygii
- Order: Siluriformes
- Family: Loricariidae
- Genus: Isbrueckerichthys
- Species: I. saxicola

Binomial name
- Isbrueckerichthys saxicola Jerep, Shibatta, E. H. L. Pereira & Oyakawa, 2006

Species of fish

Isbrueckerichthys saxicola is a species of freshwater ray-finned fish belonging to the family Loricariidae, the suckermouth armored catfishes, and the subfamily Hypoptopomatinae. the cascudinhos. This catfish is endemic to Brazil where it is known only from the Jacutinga River in the municipality of Londrina in the state of Paraná. This species reaches a standard length of 8.8 cm (3.5 in).
