= Campos Gerais National Park =

National park in Paraná, Brazil

- Parque Nacional dos Campos Gerais
- IUCN category II (national park)
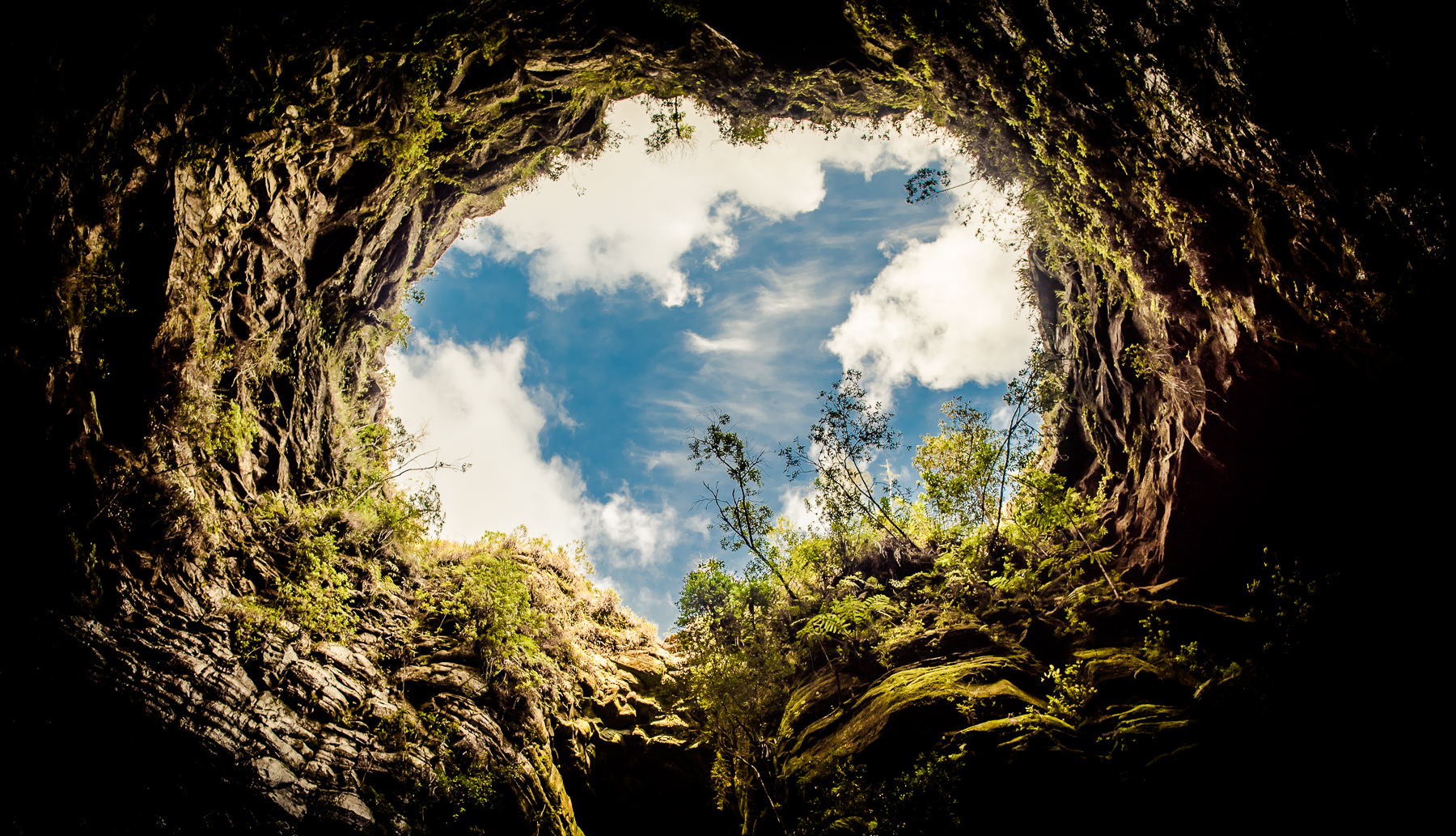
- Cave in Campos Gerais National Park

- Location within Brazil
- Nearest city: Ponta Grossa, Paraná
- Coordinates: 25°03′29″S 49°57′00″W
- Area: 21,299 hectares (52,630 acres)
- Designation: National park
- Created: 23 March 2006
- Administrator: ICMBio

Campos Gerais National Park (Portuguese: Parque Nacional dos Campos Gerais) is a national park in the state of Paraná, Brazil.

== Location ==
The Campos Gerais National Park has an area of 21,299 hectares (52,630 acres) of Atlantic Forest biome. It was created on 23 March 2006, and is administered by the Chico Mendes Institute for Biodiversity Conservation. The park lies in the Paraná municipalities of Ponta Grossa, Castro and Carambeí. Vegetation includes mixed forest and areas grassland. Ball cactus and Sinningia leucotricha are endemic. The terrain is rugged, with cliffs, canyons, faults and caves. The park holds the main sources of the Tibagi River and the Ribeira de Iguape River.

== Conservation ==
As a National Park the basic objective is the preservation of natural ecosystems of great ecological relevance and scenic beauty, enabling the conduct of scientific research and educational activities, and supporting outdoor recreation ecological tourism.

== Sources ==
- Parna dos Campos Gerais (in Portuguese), Chico Mendes Institute for Biodiversity Conservation, archived from the original on 2016-03-03
- Unidade de Conservação: Parque Nacional dos Campos Gerais (in Portuguese), MMA: Ministério do Meio Ambiente
