= Munim River =

River in Brazil

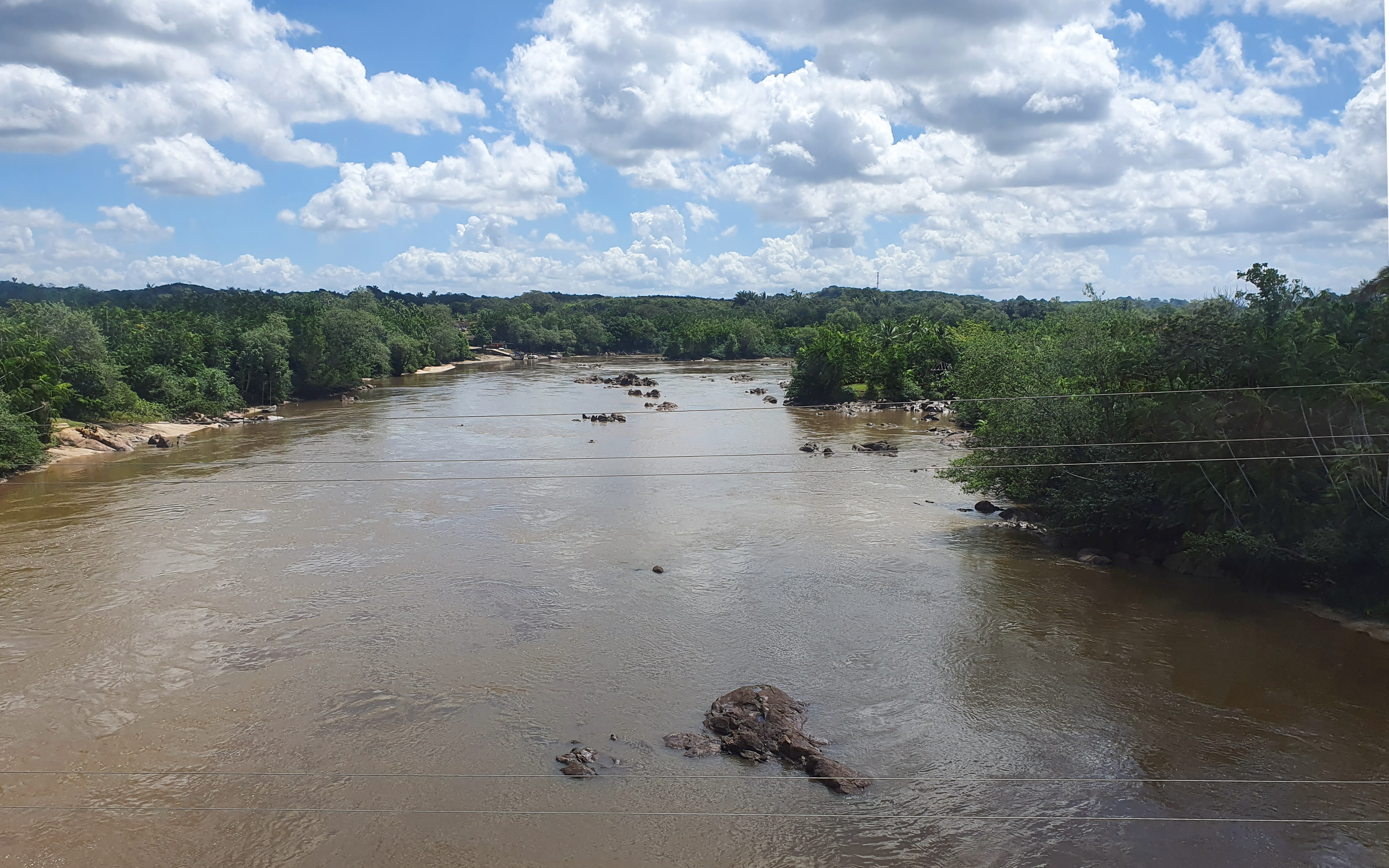

- Mouth location in Brazil
- Native name: Rio Munim (Portuguese)

Location
- Country: Brazil

Physical characteristics
- Source
  - coordinates: 4°18′30″S 43°13′17″W
- Mouth
  - coordinates: 2°44′59″S 44°05′00″W

The Munim River (Portuguese: Rio Munim) is a river of Maranhão state in northeastern Brazil. It flows north for about 320 kilometres (200 mi) before emptying into the Baía de São José to the south of the state capital. The river has suffered from agricultural pollution and from illegal dredging of sand and gravel for use in construction.

== Basin ==
The Munim River basin has an area of 15,918.04 square kilometres (6,145.99 sq mi), covering 4.79% of the state of Maranhão, in the extreme east of the state. The basin includes parts of 23 municipalities of Maranhão, of which 7 are completely contained within the basin: Afonso Cunha, Cachoeira Grande, Chapadinha, Mata Roma, Nina Rodrigues, Presidente Vargas and São Benedito do Rio Preto.

== Course ==
The Munim River is formed in Afonso Cunha by the confluence of the Riacho da Barriguda and the Riacho do Bio. Its sources are in the Tabuleiros of the Barreiras Formation, to the northeast of the municipality of Caxias. The sources rise in the municipalities of Aldeias Altas (Munim River), Buriti (Preto River) and Codó (Iguará River). The river has a length of about 320 kilometres (200 mi). The main tributaries on the left bank are the Iguará River, Paulica River, and the Mocambo, Raiz, Cruz and São Gonçalo streams. The main tributaries on the right bank are the Preto River and the Pirangi, Una and Mata streams.

The river flows in a roughly NNW direction to enter the Baía de São José (or Baía do Arraial) between Axixá and Icatu. The seat of the municipality of Axixá lies on the left bank of the river. The municipality is named for a large tree with red berries found on the banks of the river.

== Environment ==
The 11,971 hectares (29,580 acres) Chapada Limpa Extractive Reserve, created in 2007, lies in the river basin. The lower reaches of the river flow through the 1,535,310 hectares (3,793,800 acres) Upaon-Açu/Miritiba/Alto Preguiças Environmental Protection Area, created in 1992. The Munim River Hydrographic Basin Committee was created in 2013, installed in 2014, with the objective of ensuring sustainable development of the river basin. In September 2015 the committee meet to discuss the proposal for a state Rio Preto and Riacho Estrela Environmental / Biological Reserve.

A study published in 2006 found that human activity in the municipality of Chapadinha had caused serious problems, particularly projects to produce soybeans. Deforestation to clear land for agriculture had accelerated erosion of the banks and siltation of the river. Subsistence agriculture had caused chemicals to be washed into the river, contaminating the bed. Dredging to remove sand and gravel for sale in nearby towns made the water muddy and oily. In October 2014 a public hearing was held on extraction of sand from the Munim River bed. State Representative Bira do Pindaré reported on the hearing to the legislature, including the finding that a company was extracting sand illegally in the municipality of Presidente Juscelino.

== See also ==
- List of rivers of Maranhão

== Sources ==
- APA Upaon-Açu/Miritiba/Alto Preguiças (in Portuguese), ISA: Instituto Socioambiental
- Comitê de Bacia Hidrográfica do Rio Munim convoca primeira assembleia (in Portuguese), Governo do Maranhão, 14 September 2015
- Costa, Domingas (22 October 2014), Rio Munim pode “morrer” diante da extração ilegal e criminosa de areia (in Portuguese)
- "Paisagens do Rio Munim em Axixá/Maranhão", turisbrasil (in Portuguese)
- Regiões hidrográficas do Maranhão (in Portuguese), UEMA: Universidade Estadual do Maranhão
- Ribeiro, F.V.; Gonçalves, L. D. P.; Furtado, M. S.; Feitosa, A. C. (September 2006), "Degradação do solo no médio curso do Rio Munim, município de Chapadinha-MA" (PDF), VI Regional Conference on Geomorphology (in Portuguese)
- Unidade de Conservação: Reserva Extrativista Chapada Limpa (in Portuguese), MMA: Ministério do Meio Ambiente
