= São Luís Island =

Island in Maranhão, Brazil

Native name: Ilha de São Luís · Upaon-Açu · Ilha de Maranhão
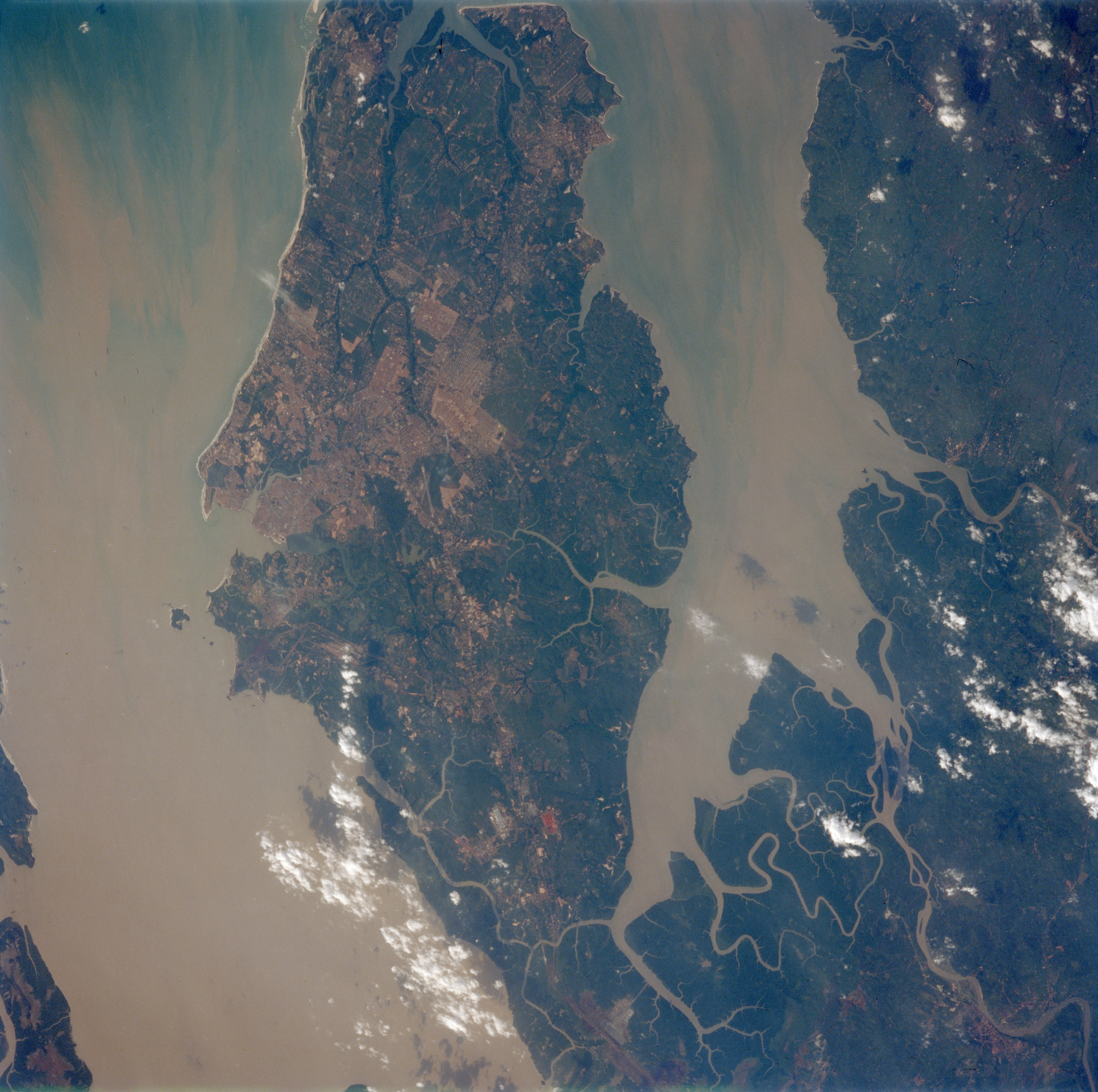
- Aerial view (northeast at top)
- Interactive map of São Luís Island

Geography
- Location: Off Brazil, Atlantic Ocean
- Coordinates: 02°36′S 44°14′W
- Area: 1,412.4 km^{2} (545.3 sq mi)
- Area rank: 269th
- Highest elevation: 82 ft (25 m)

Administration
- Brazil
- Province: Maranhão
- Largest settlement: São Luís

Demographics
- Population: 1,453,128 (2021)
- Population rank: 46th
- Pop. density: 1,031/km^{2} (2670/sq mi)
- Languages: Portuguese (North Coast Brazilian Portuguese)
- Ethnic groups: Maranhense; Caboclos; Portuguese Brazilians; Afro-Brazilians

Additional information
- Time zone: Brasília Time (UTC–3)

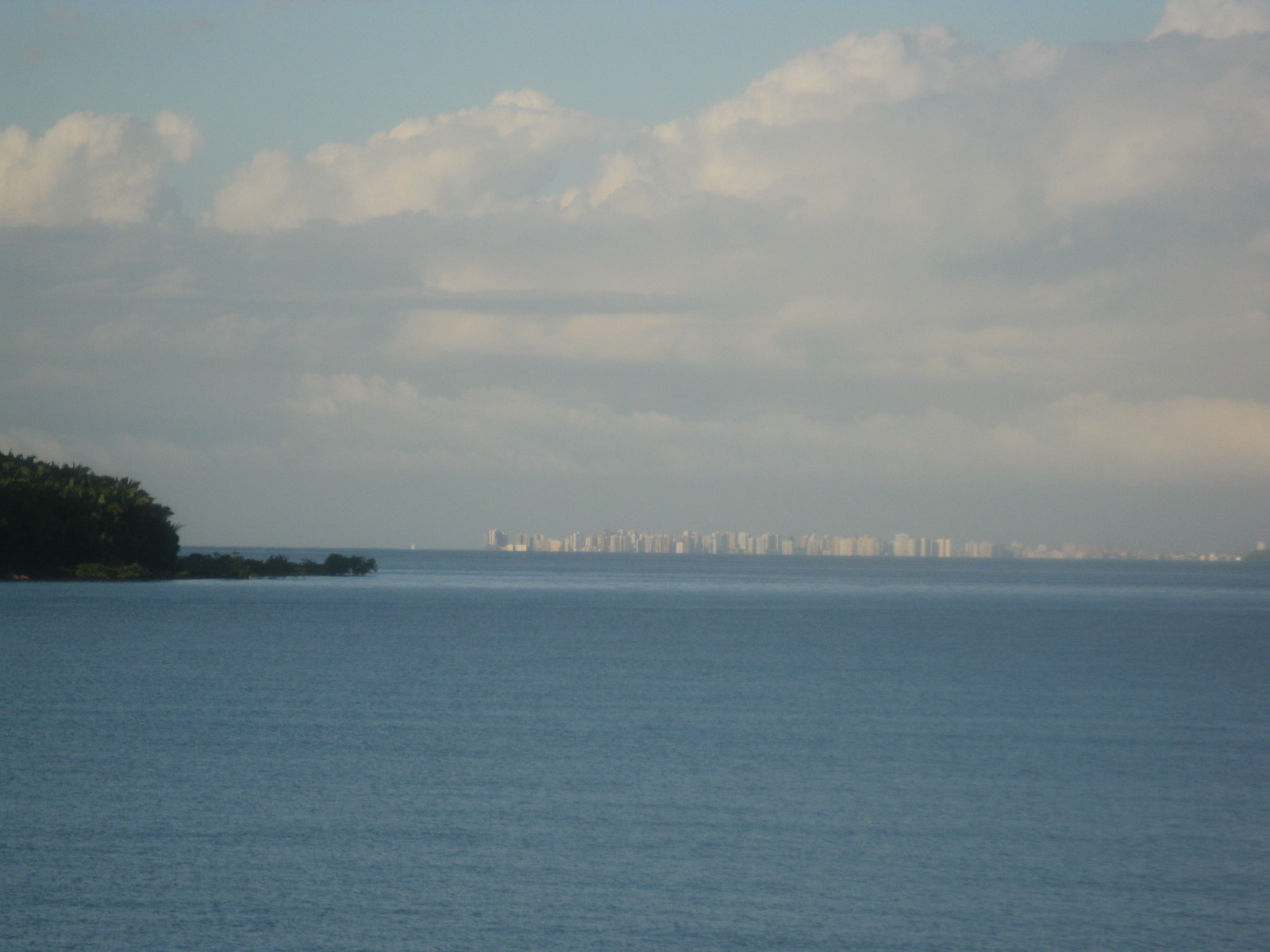
São Marcos Bay and São Luís

São Luís Island also known as Upaon-Açu Island (officially) or Maranhão Island is an island in the state of Maranhão, Brazil with an area of 1,412.4 km^{2} (545 sq mi), located between the Baía de São Marcos and the Baía de São José. There are four cities located in the island: São Luís, after which the island is named, São José de Ribamar, Paço do Lumiar, and Raposa. The city of São Luís also covers three more minor islands, Tauá Mirim, Tauá, and Medo. Raposa also has an island. The population of these four cities according to the mid 2021 estimate is 1,453,128, up from 1,309,330 at the 2010 Census. São Luís is the capital of the state. The Island was originally named Upaon-Açu (meaning "Big Island" in the Tupi language) by the native inhabitants of the island. It is the most populous island in South America, and is reckoned among the 50 most populous islands in the world, with a similar population to Sardinia or Manhattan.

== History ==
The city of São Luis was founded in 1612 by Daniel de la Rivardière, a French officer commissioned by Henri IV of France to establish a colony in this vicinity. It was named for Henri's 8-greats-grandfather, King Saint Louis IX (1214–1270). The French colony was expelled in 1615 by the Portuguese, who, in turn, surrendered to the Dutch in 1641. In 1644 the Dutch abandoned the island, when the Portuguese resumed possession, and held the city to the end of their colonial rule in Brazil. The city became the seat of a bishopric in 1679.

== Geography ==
The island of Upaon-Açu is located between two large estuarine systems that are the bays of São Marcos on the right side and São José on the left side in the central region of Golfão Maranhense. It has an area of 1,412.4 km^{2} (349,000 acres), similar to Rhodes or Kauaʻi. The two bays are interconnected in the southwest by the channels of the Strait of Mosquitoes and Strait of Coqueiros (separating the island of Upaon-Açu from the island of Tauá-Mirim). In the São Marcos bay, the watershed of the Mearim river and its tributaries flows, while in the São José/Arraial bay the watersheds of the Itapecuru and Munim rivers break. In this region, the amplitude of the tides can exceed seven meters. The region presents numerous streams and tidal channels. Several agents have modeled relief such as those of climatic, hydrological and oceanographic origin, as well as intense wind, marine and fluvial activity, with vegetation characterized by remnants of the Amazonian Forest, Mangroves and Campo de Perizes, an extensive fluvial plain with predominantly herbaceous, located on the mainland.

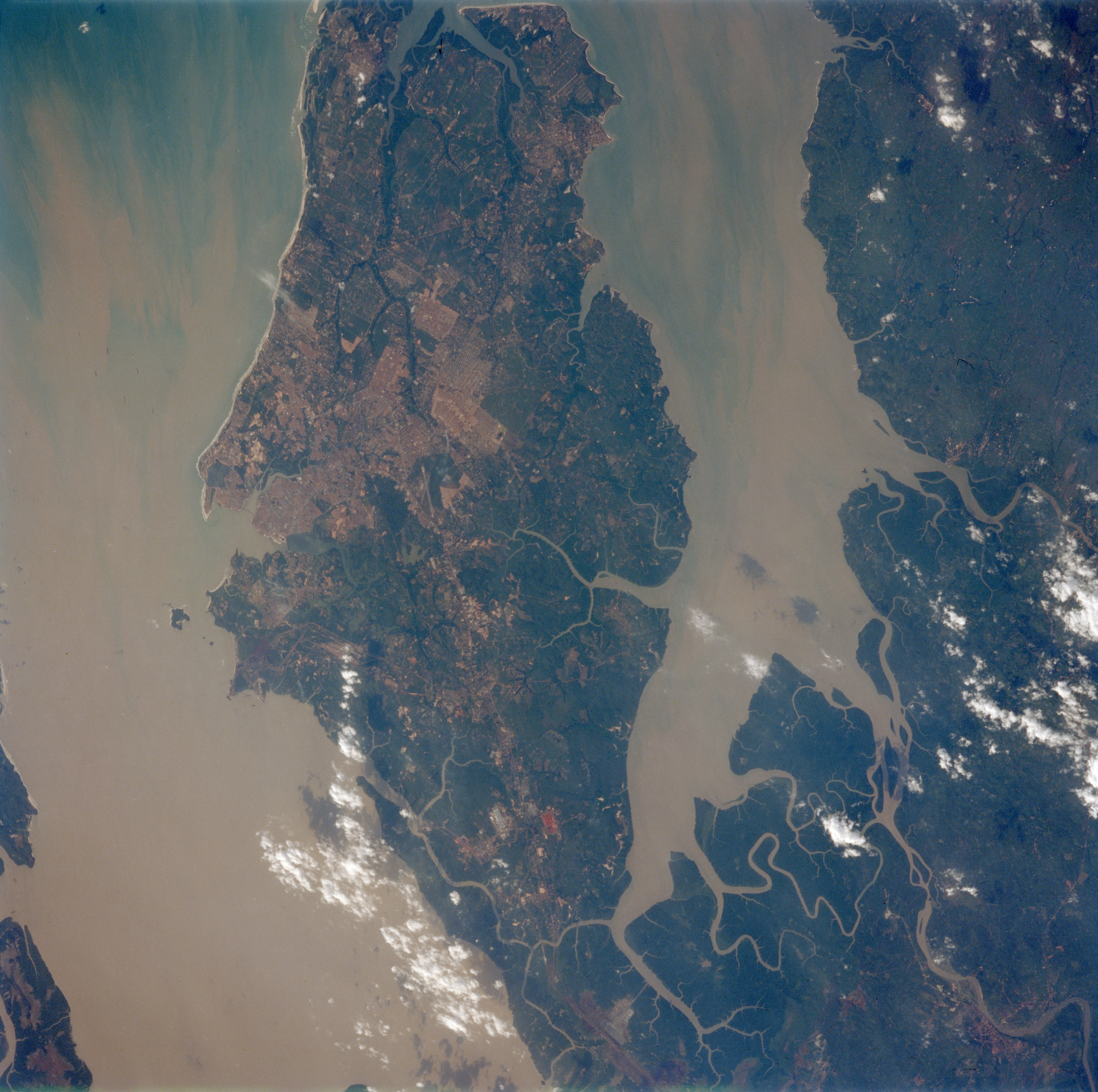
Satellite image of the island of Upaon-Açu

The climate is characterized as hot, semi-humid, tropical of equatorial zone, with two distinct seasons that go from damp (January to June) the drought (July to December), with average rainfall of 2,200 mm (87 in) per year. Some of the conservation units of the island are: APA das Reentrancias Maranhenses; APA of Upaon-Açu-Miritiba-Alto Preguiças, APA of Itapiracó; APA of the Maracanã Region; and the Bacanga State Parks, the Jansen Lagoon and the Rangedor.

On the Strait of Mosquitoes, there are road and railroad bridges linking the mainland to Upaon-Açu Island: the Marcelino Machado bridge, BR-135, composed of two parallel inlet and outlet bridges (456 and 454 meters in length); the metal bridge Benedito Leite, belonging to the São Luís-Teresina Railway; the duplicate bridge belonging to the Carajás Railway; the metal bridge that supports the Italuís waterway, which carries water from the river Itapecuru to the city of São Luís.

There is also a ferry service between São Luís and Alcântara and São Luís International Airport. Also on the island are the Port of Alumar, the Port of Itaqui and the Ponta da Madeira, to which mainly iron, copper and bauxite extracted from Carajás are transported through the Carajás Railway, which also transports soy, fuel, pulp and other products.

== Gallery ==
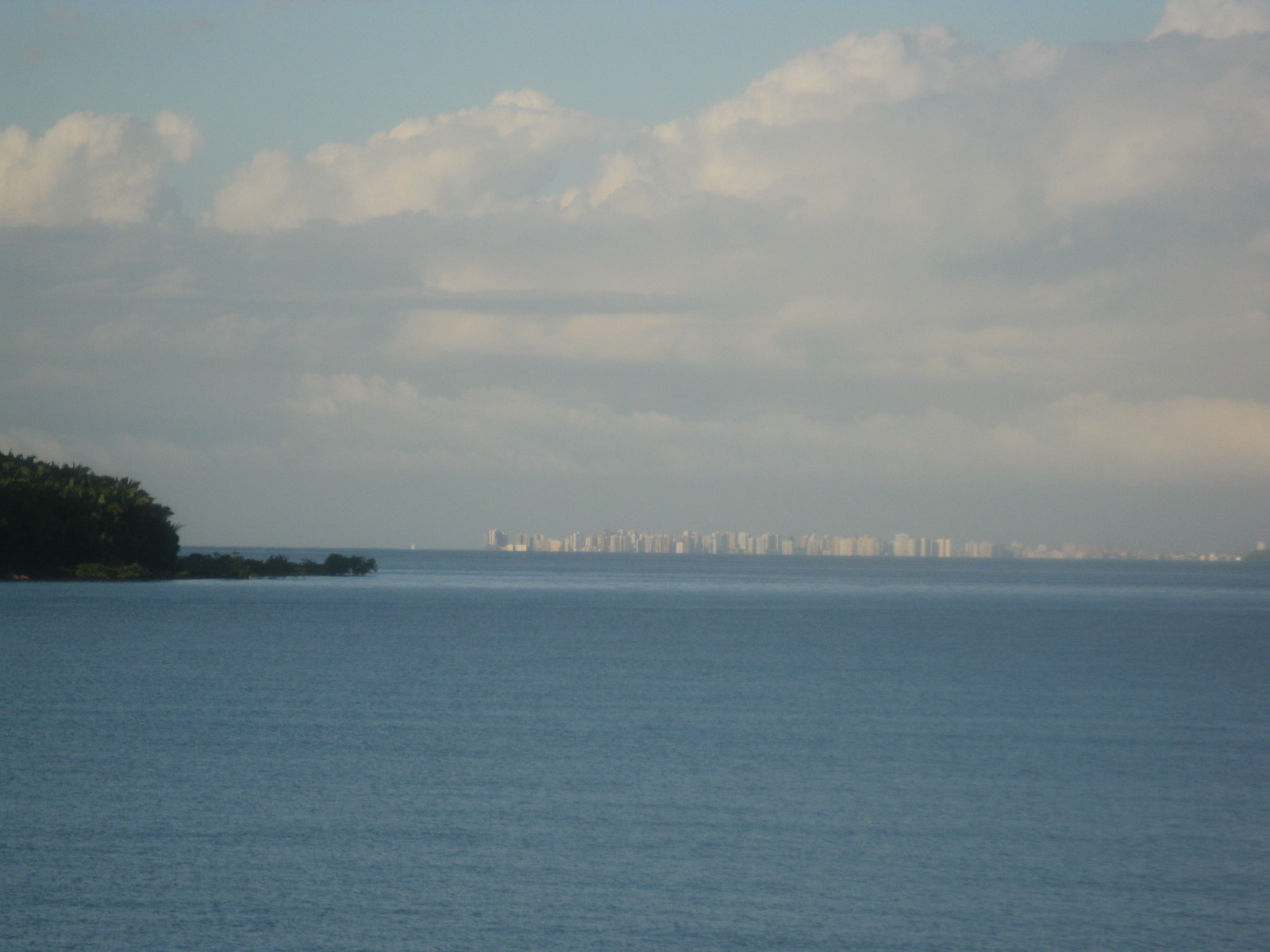
São Marcos Bay

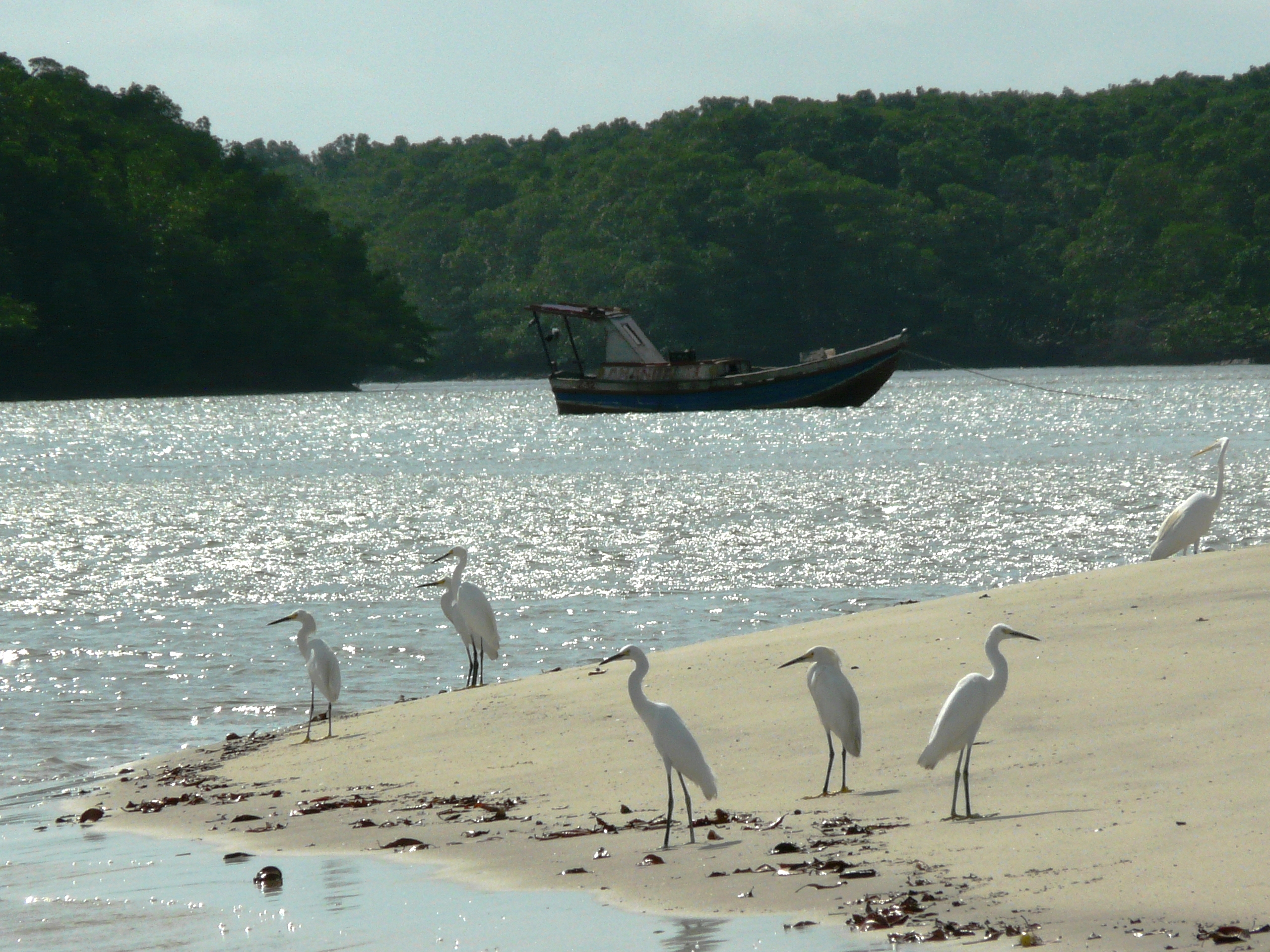
Resting Herons

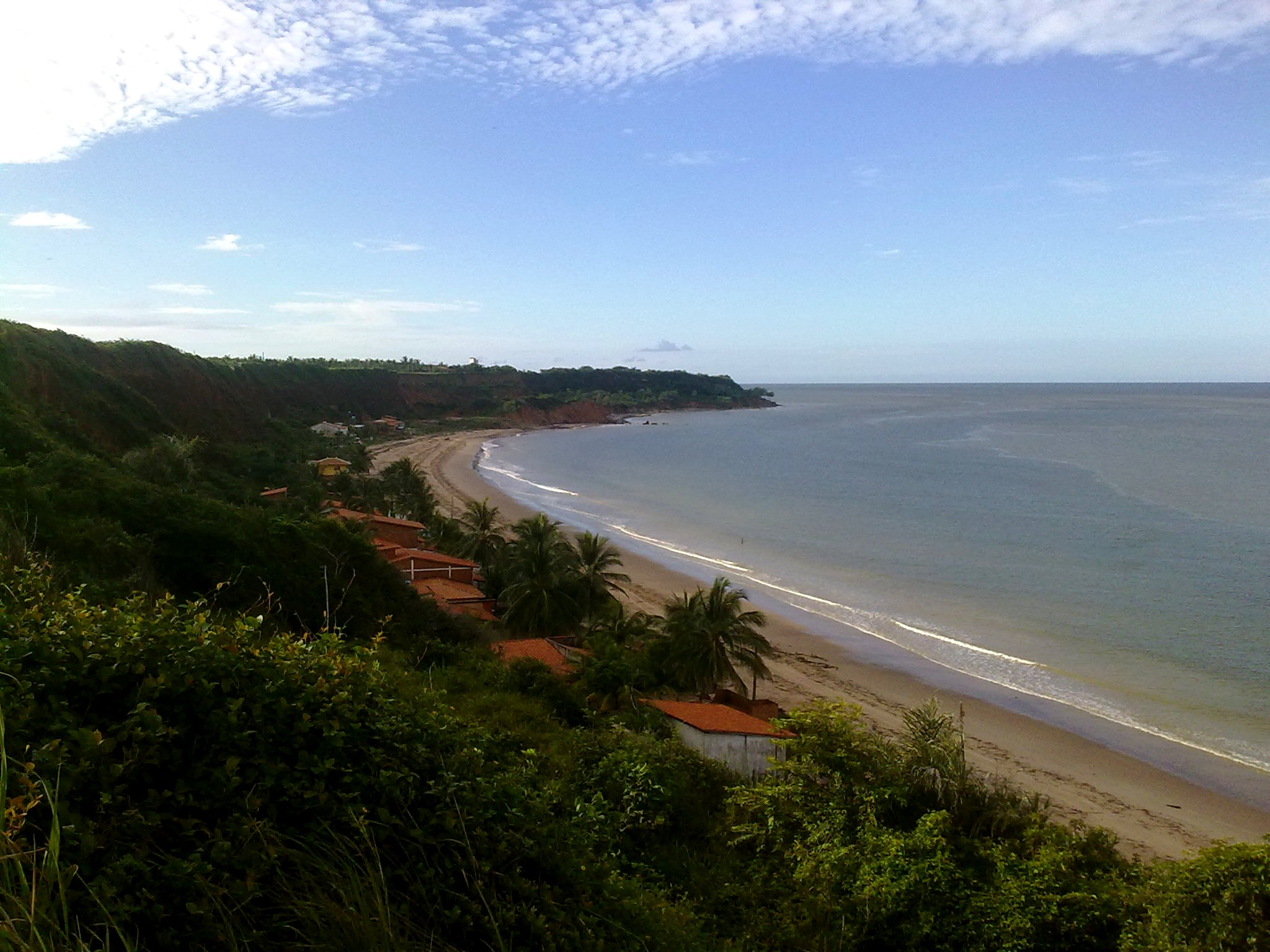
Ponta-Verde

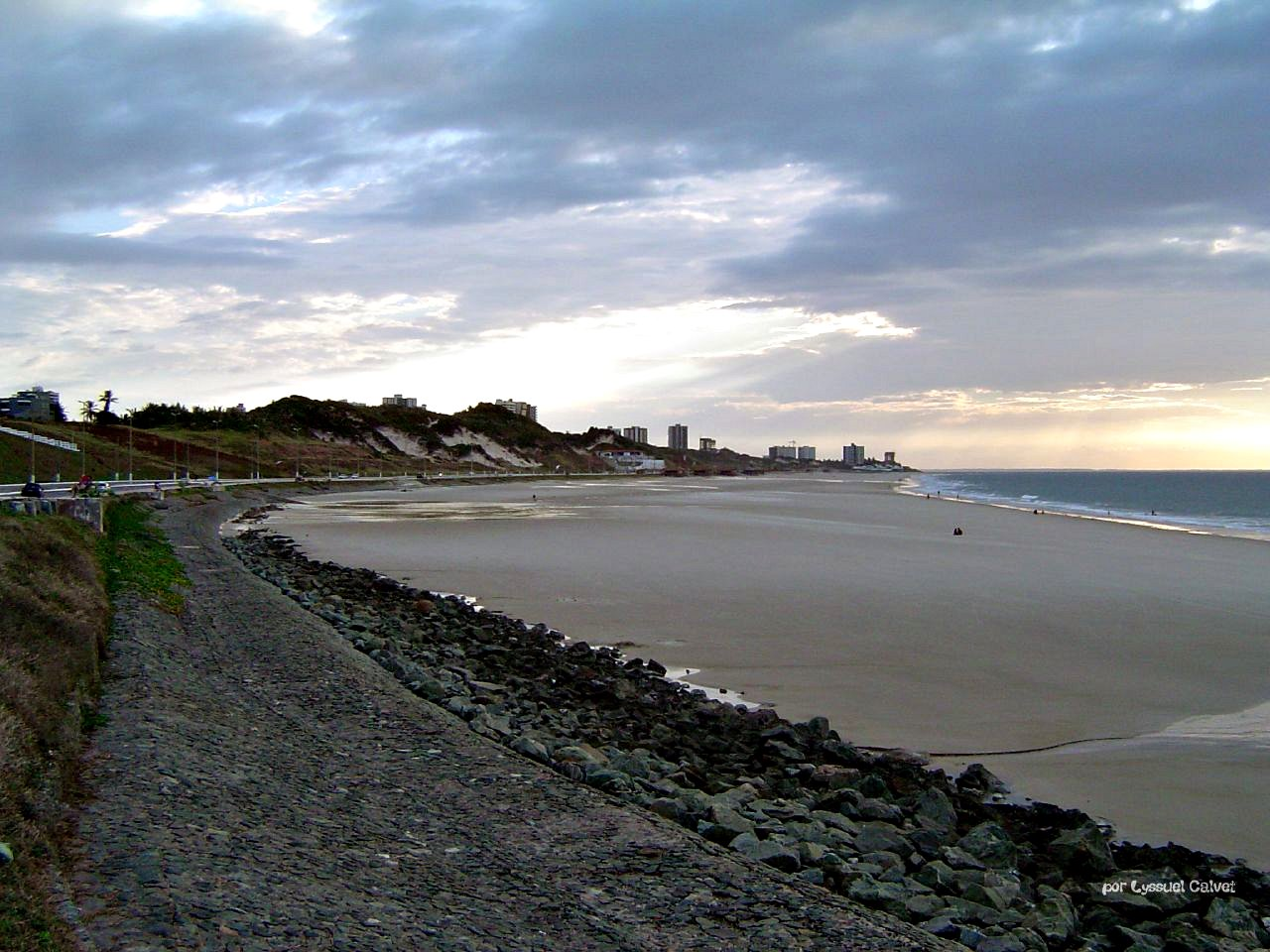
Seaside Avenue

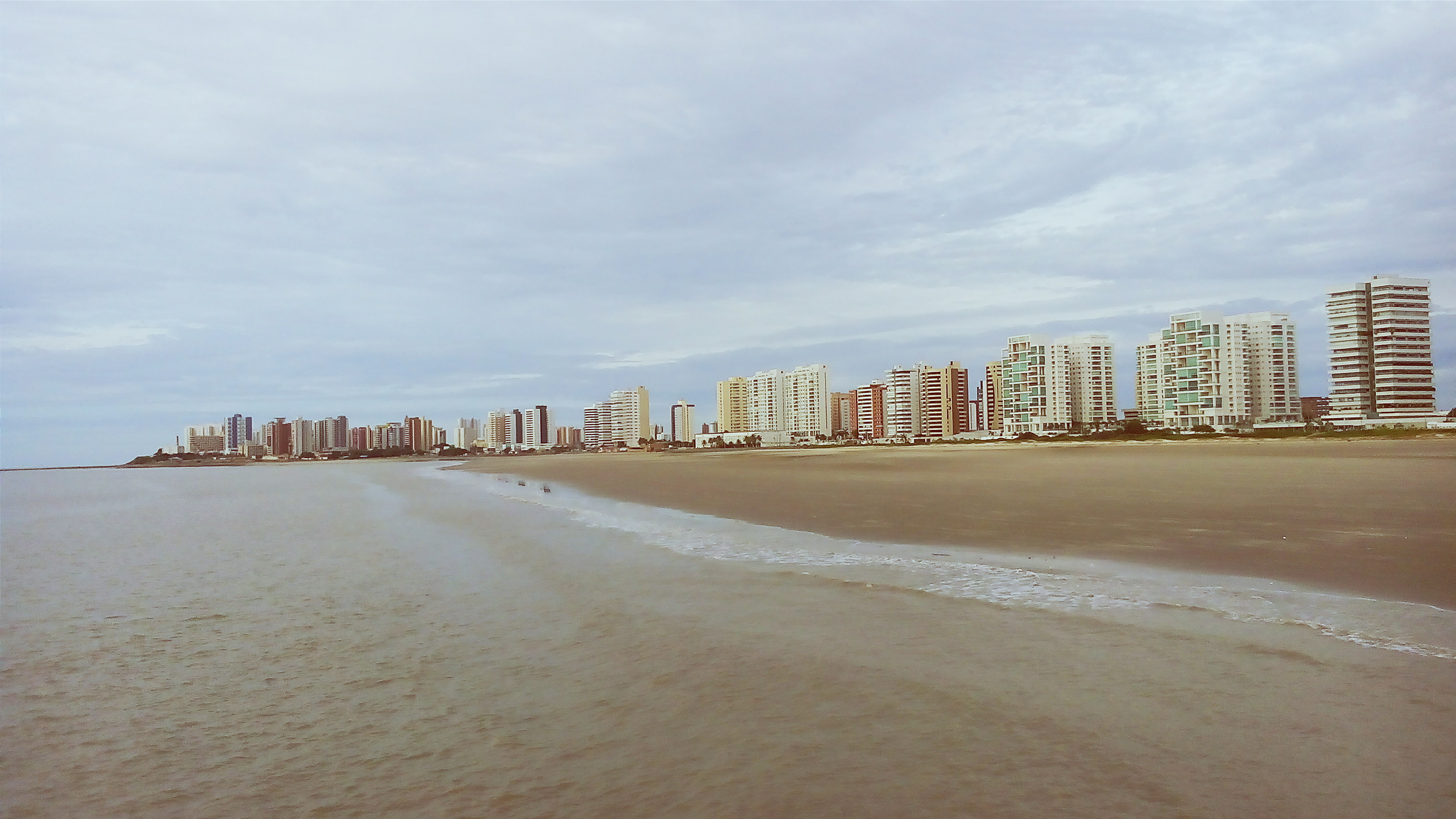
Ponta D'Areia

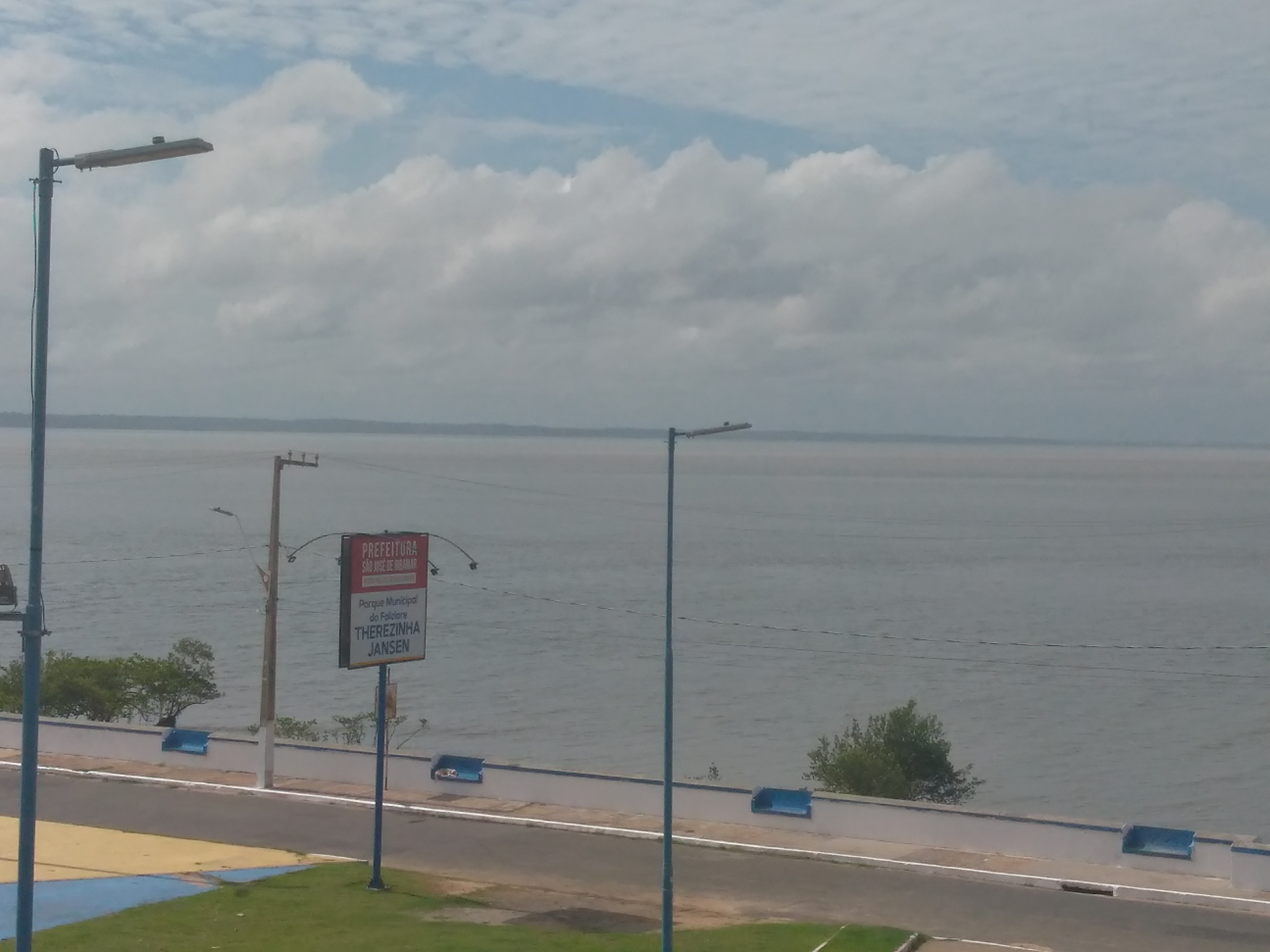
Seaside Avenue, São José de Ribamar

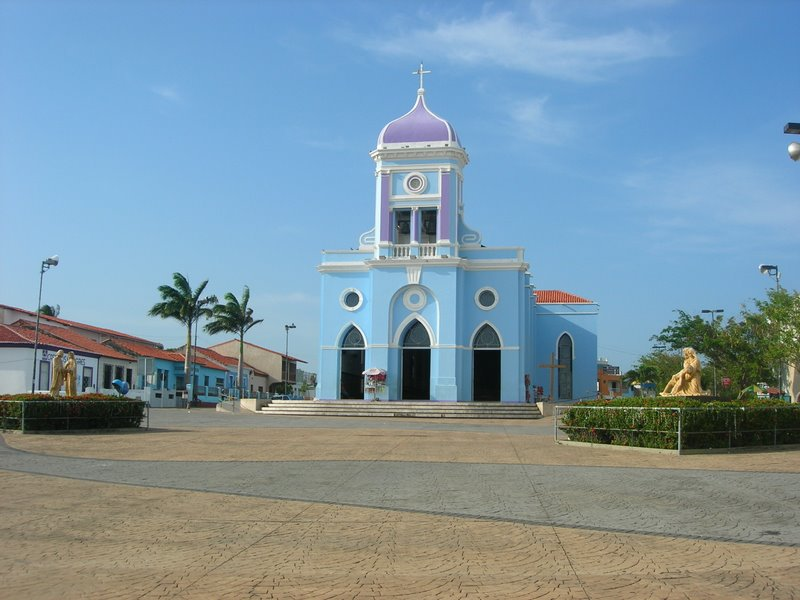
Main Square, São José de Ribamar

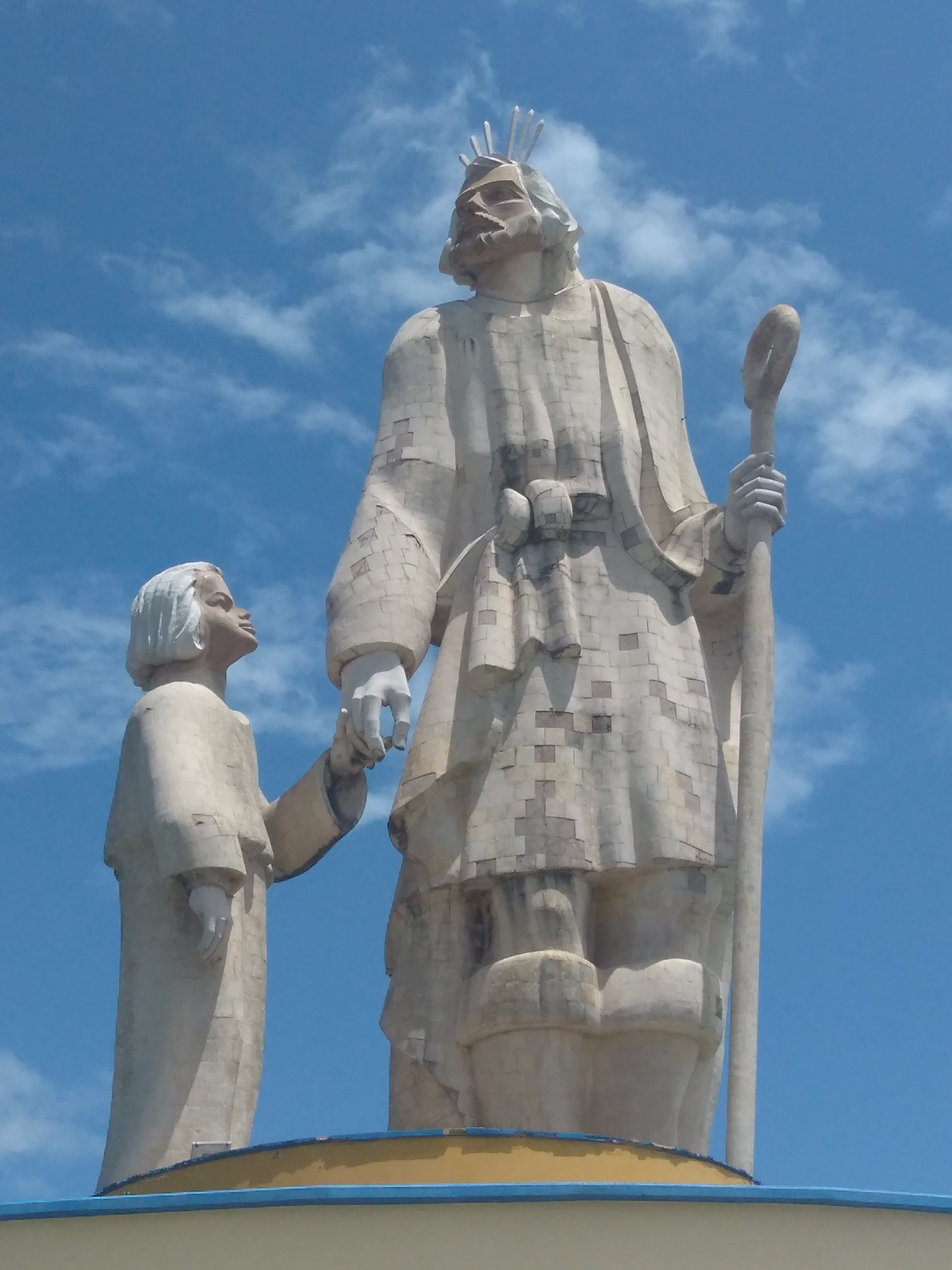
Monument to Saint Joseph of Ribamar

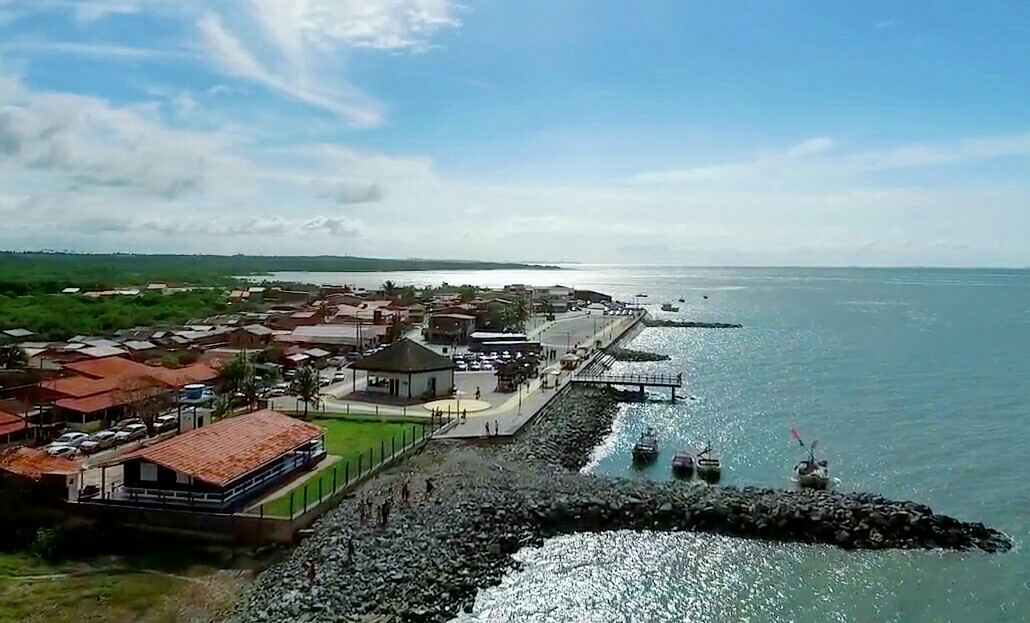
Raposa, Maranhão

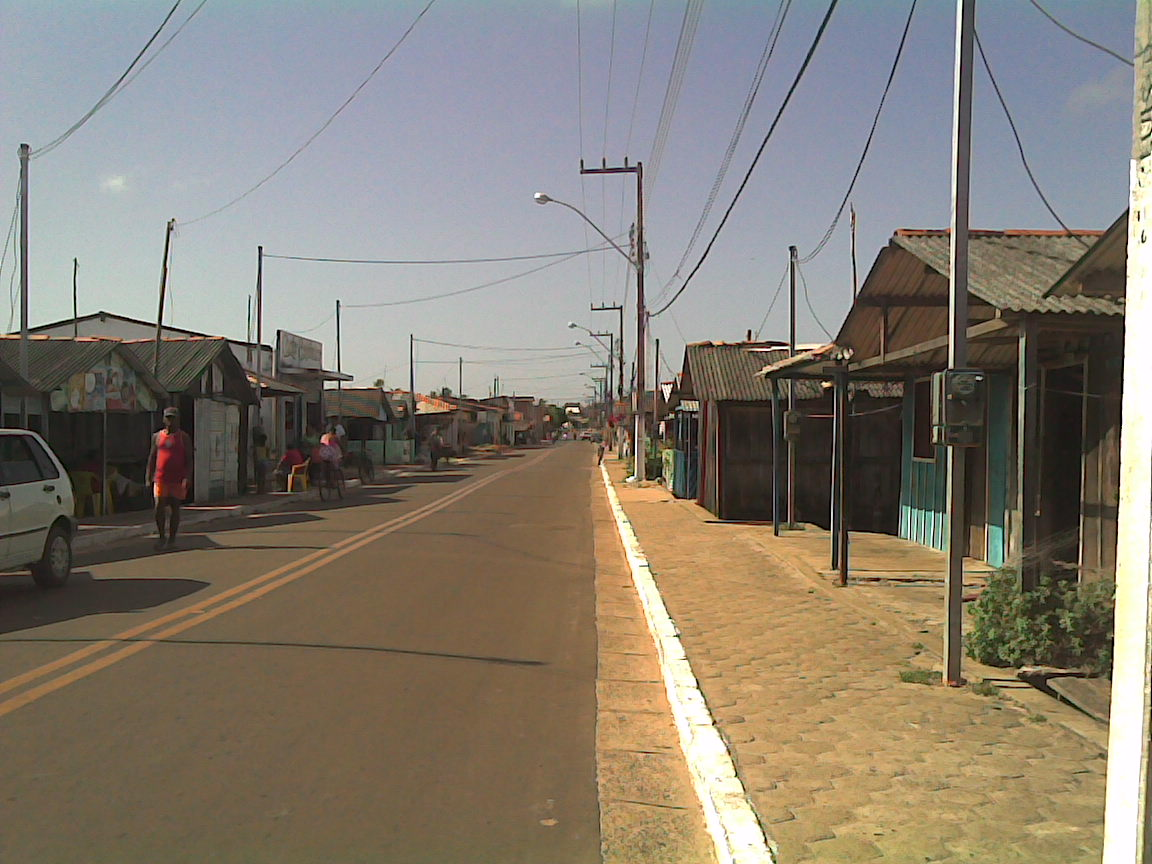
Main Avenue, Raposa

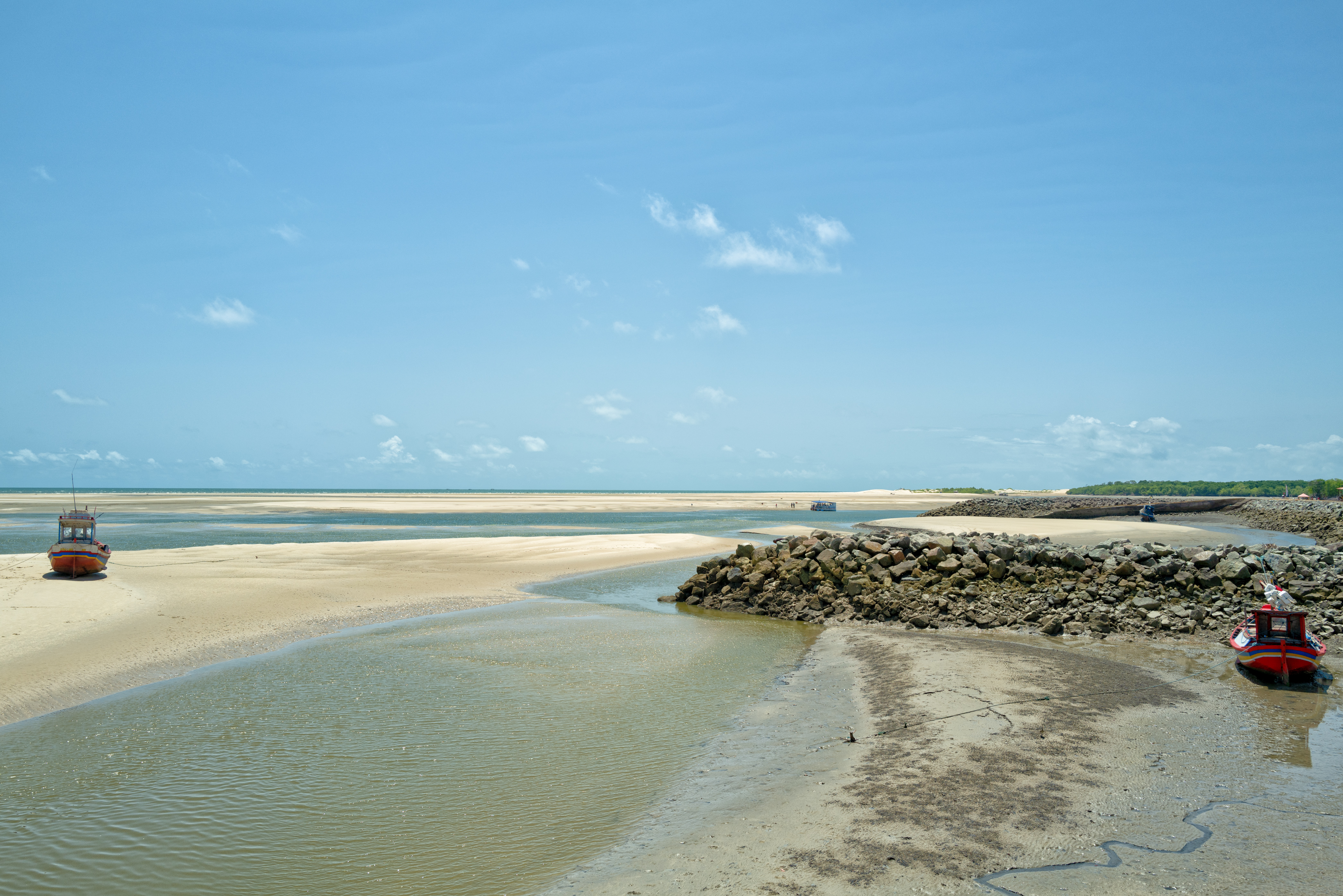
Beach, Raposa

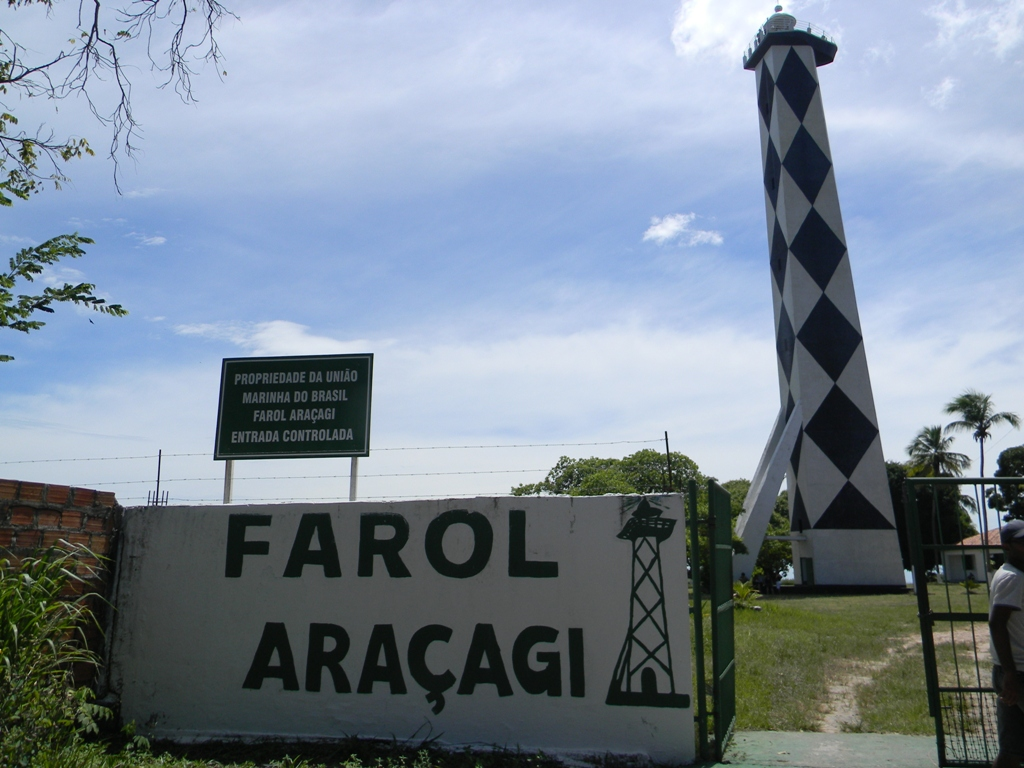
Araçagi Lighthouse, Paço do Lumiar

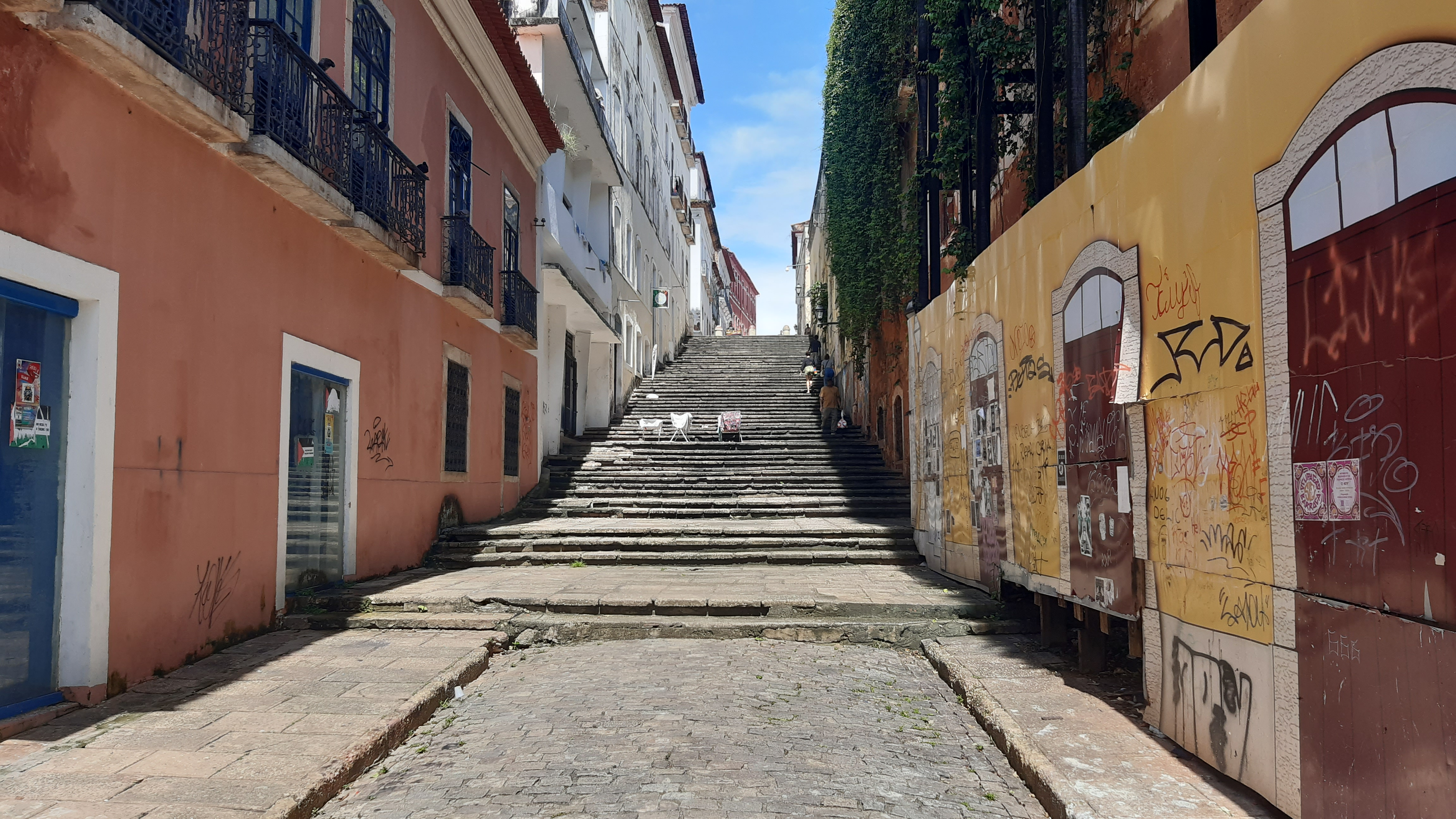
Historic Center, São Luís

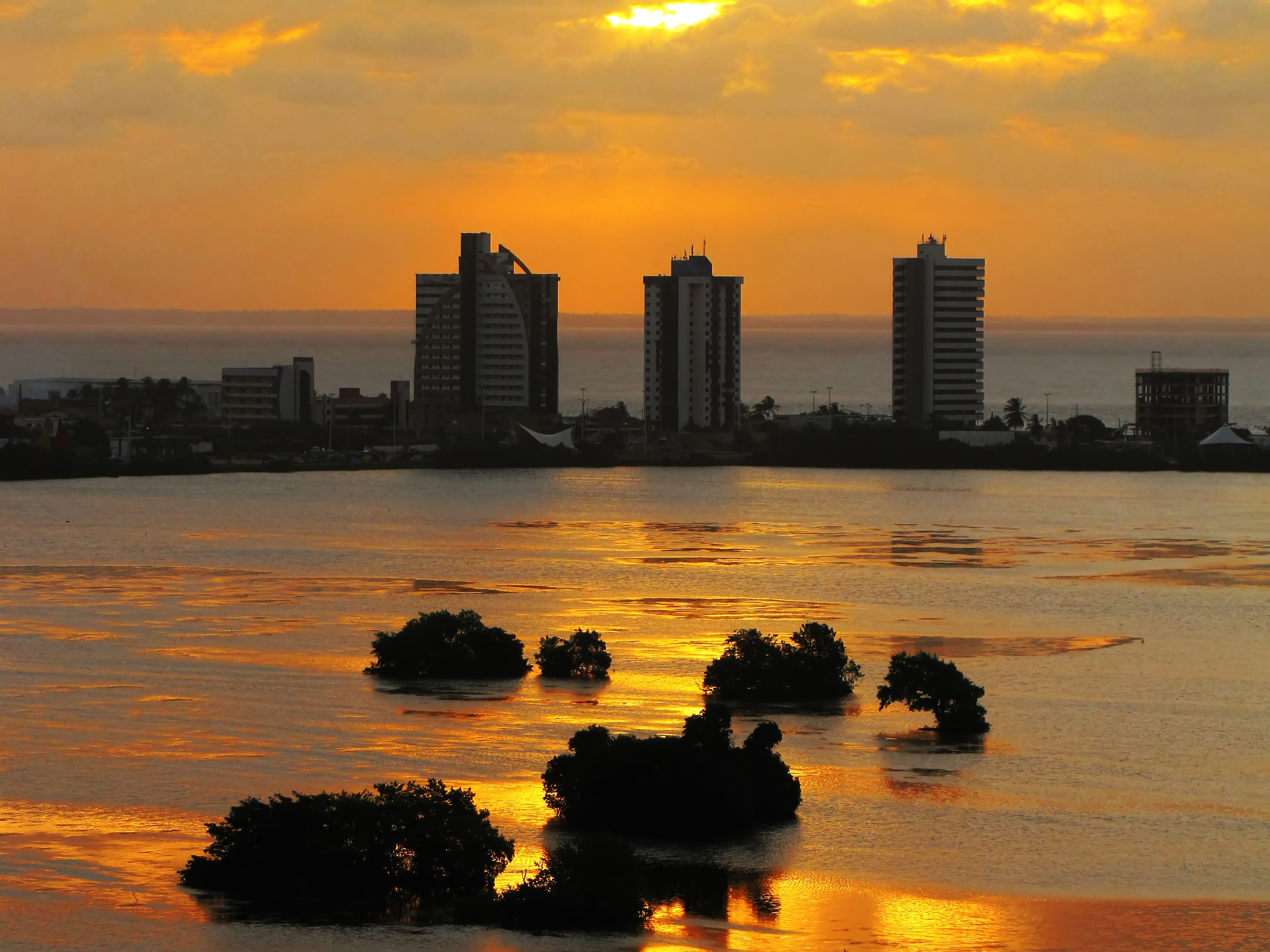
Jansen Lagoon, São Luís

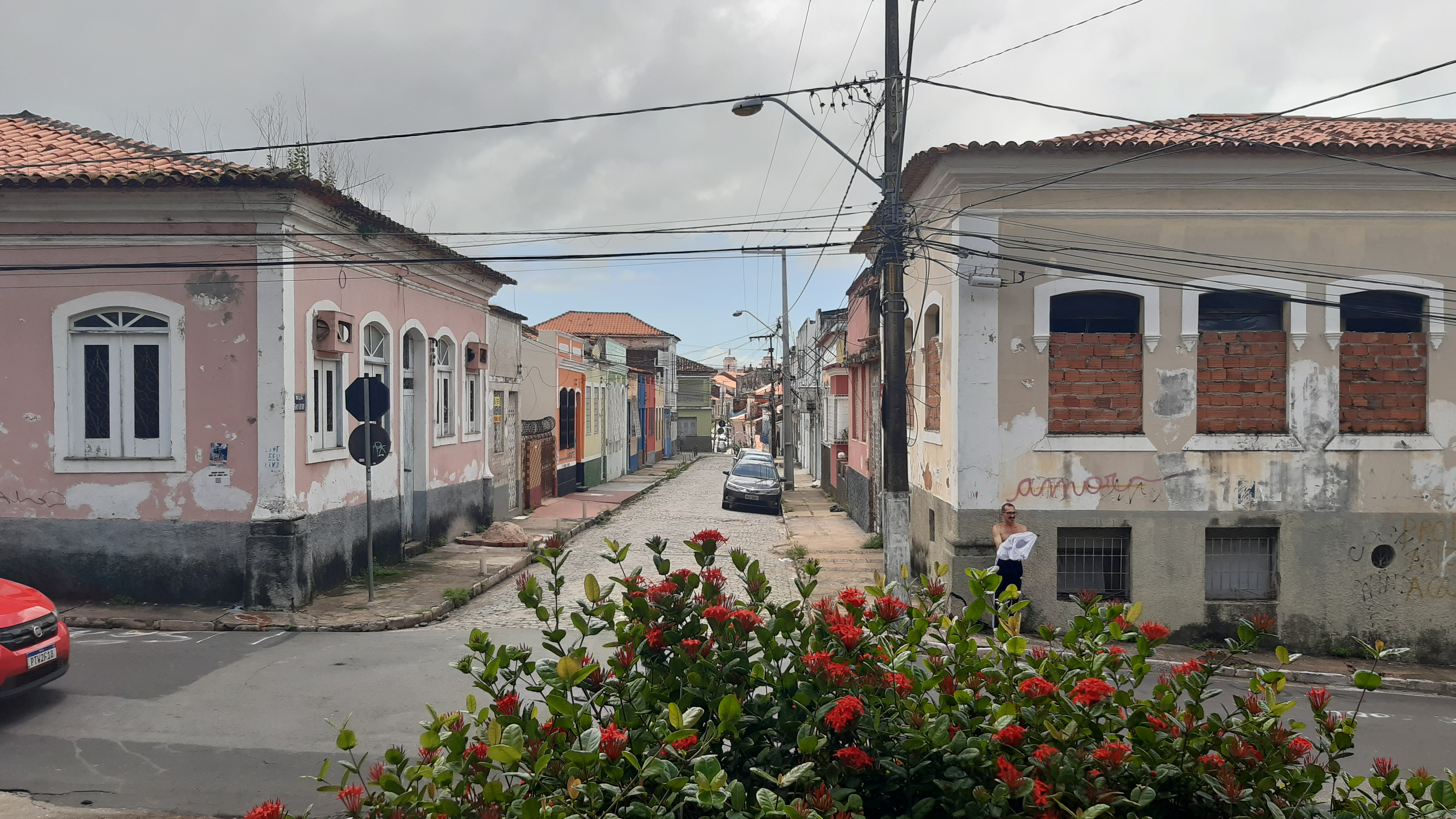
Antônio Lobo Square, São Luís

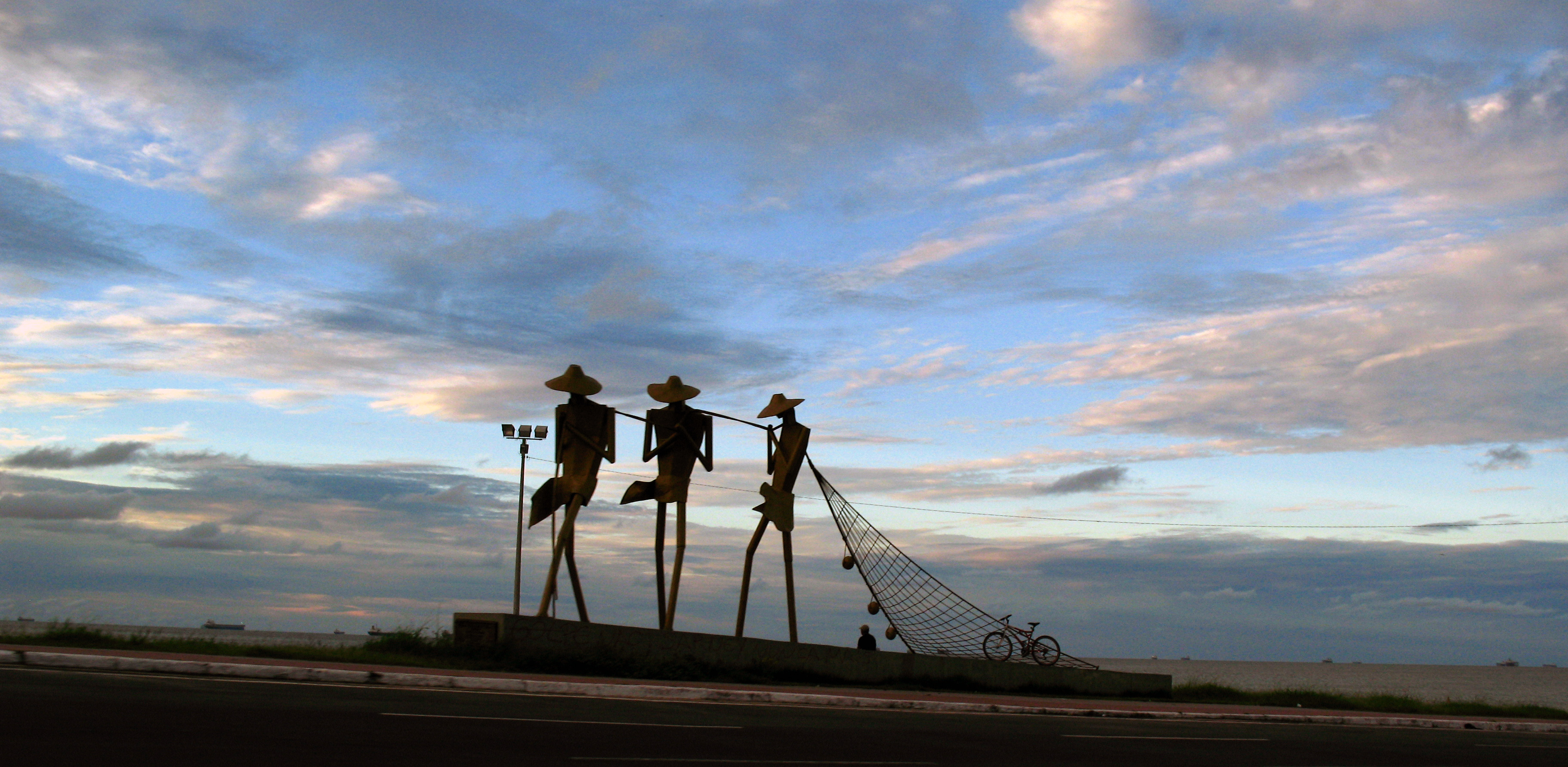
Monument to the Fishermen, São Luís

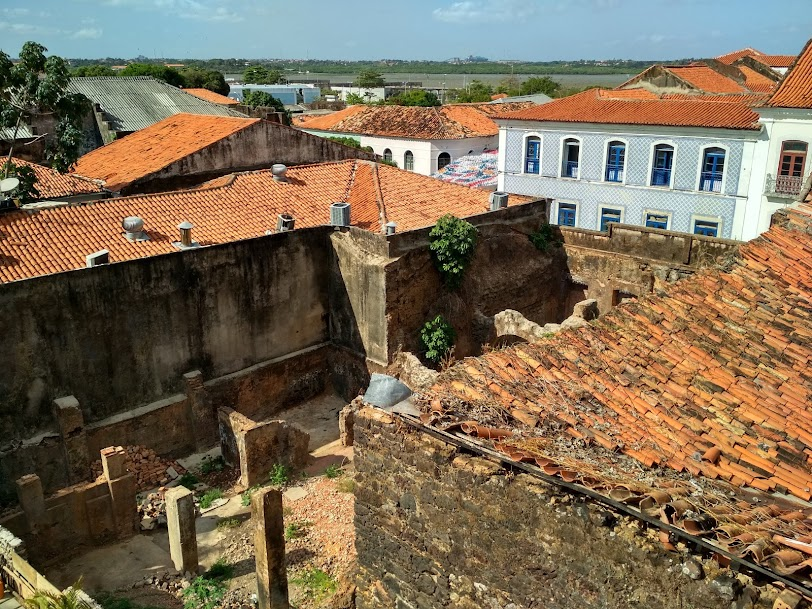
Historic Center, São Luís

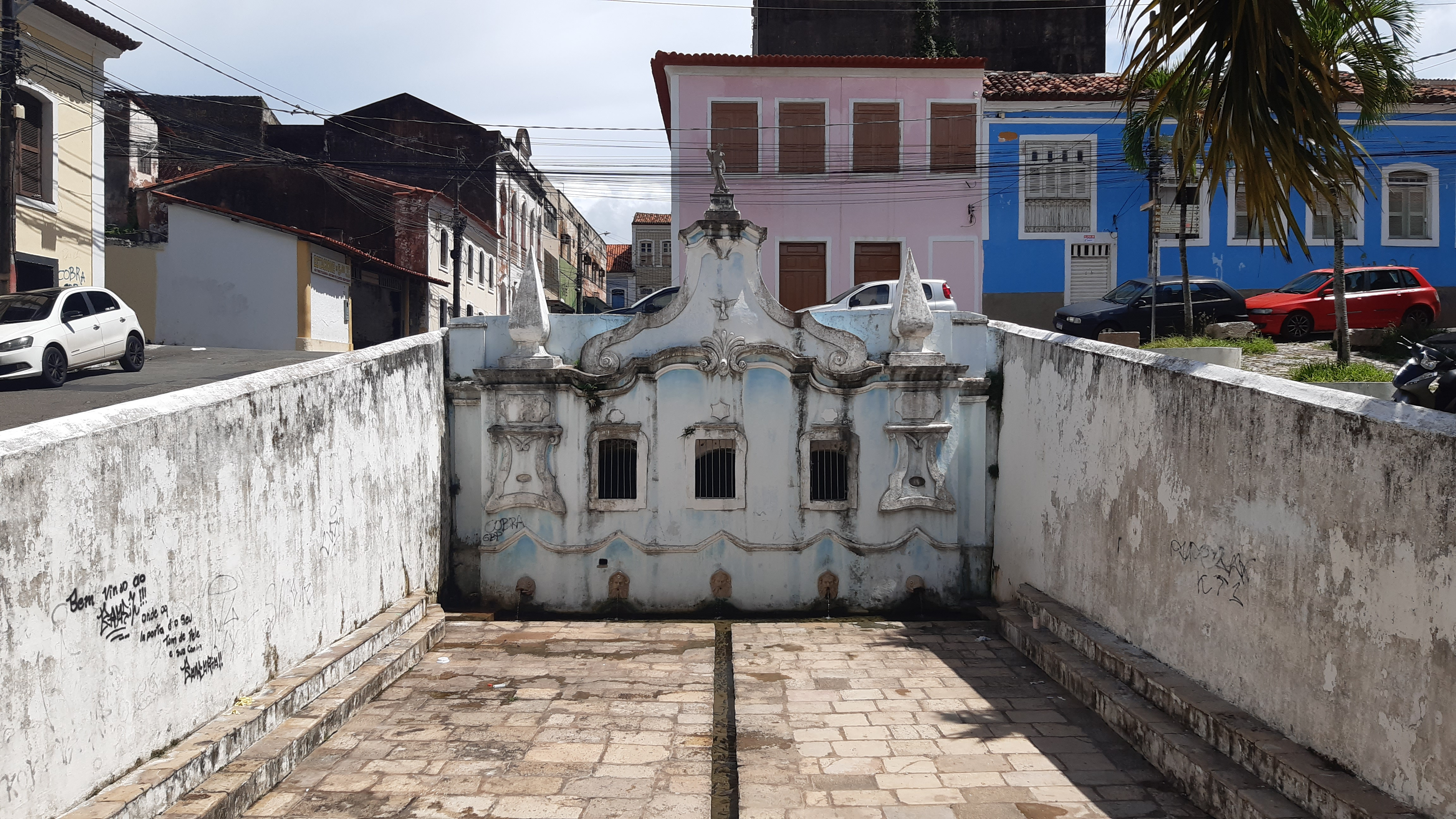
Ribeirão Fountain, São Luís

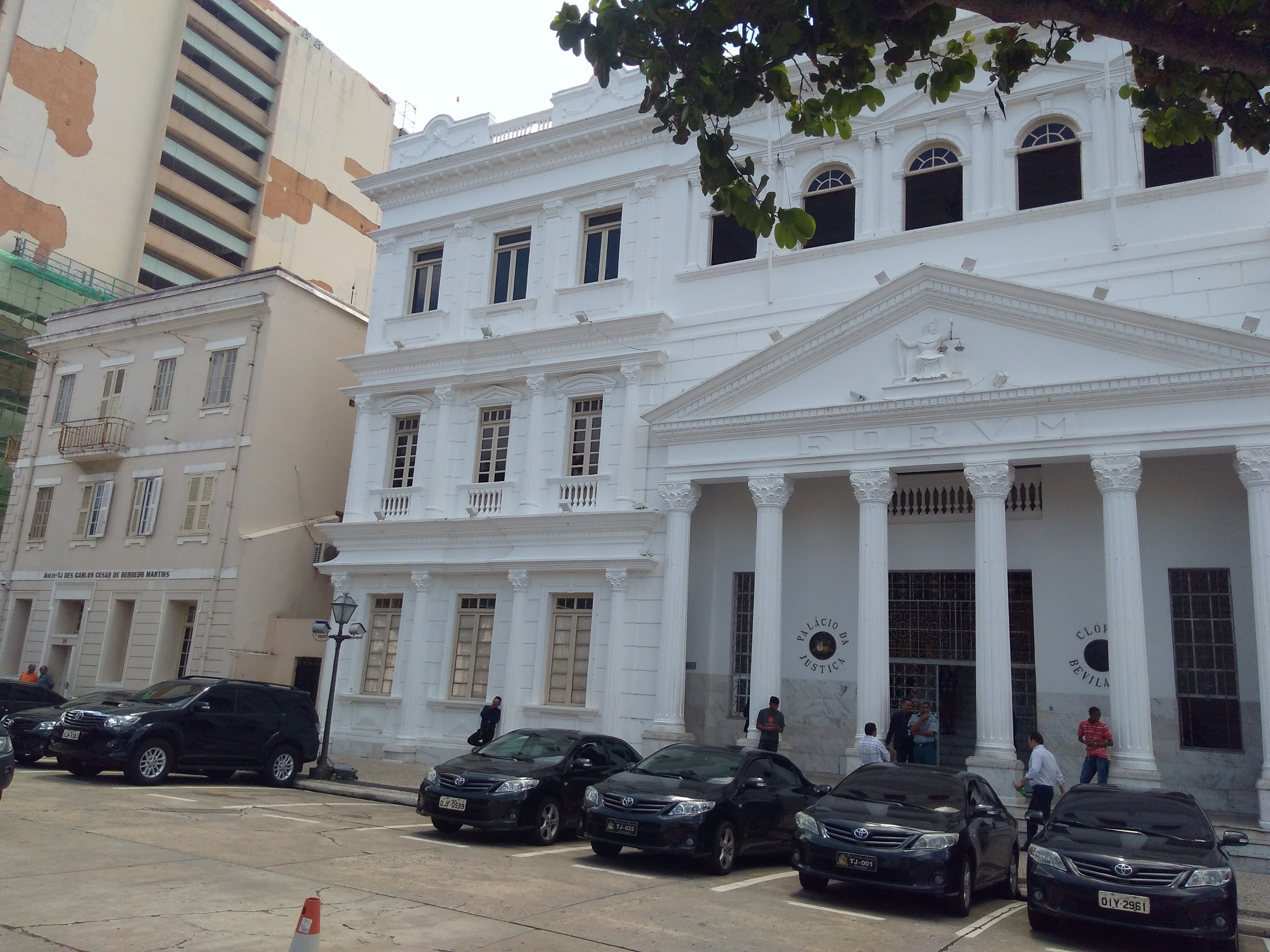
Court of Justice of Maranhão (TJMA)

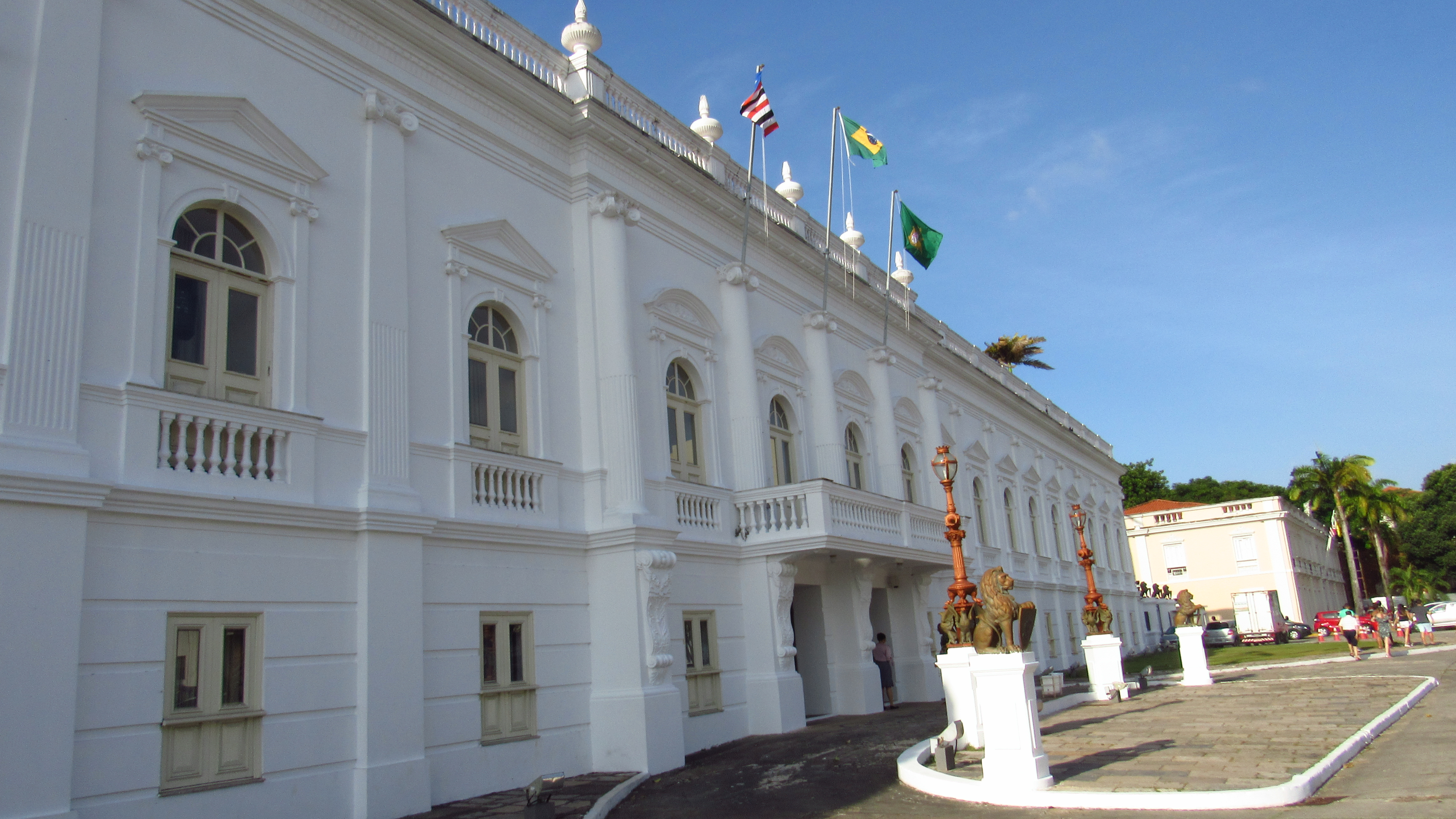
Palace of the Lions, São Luís

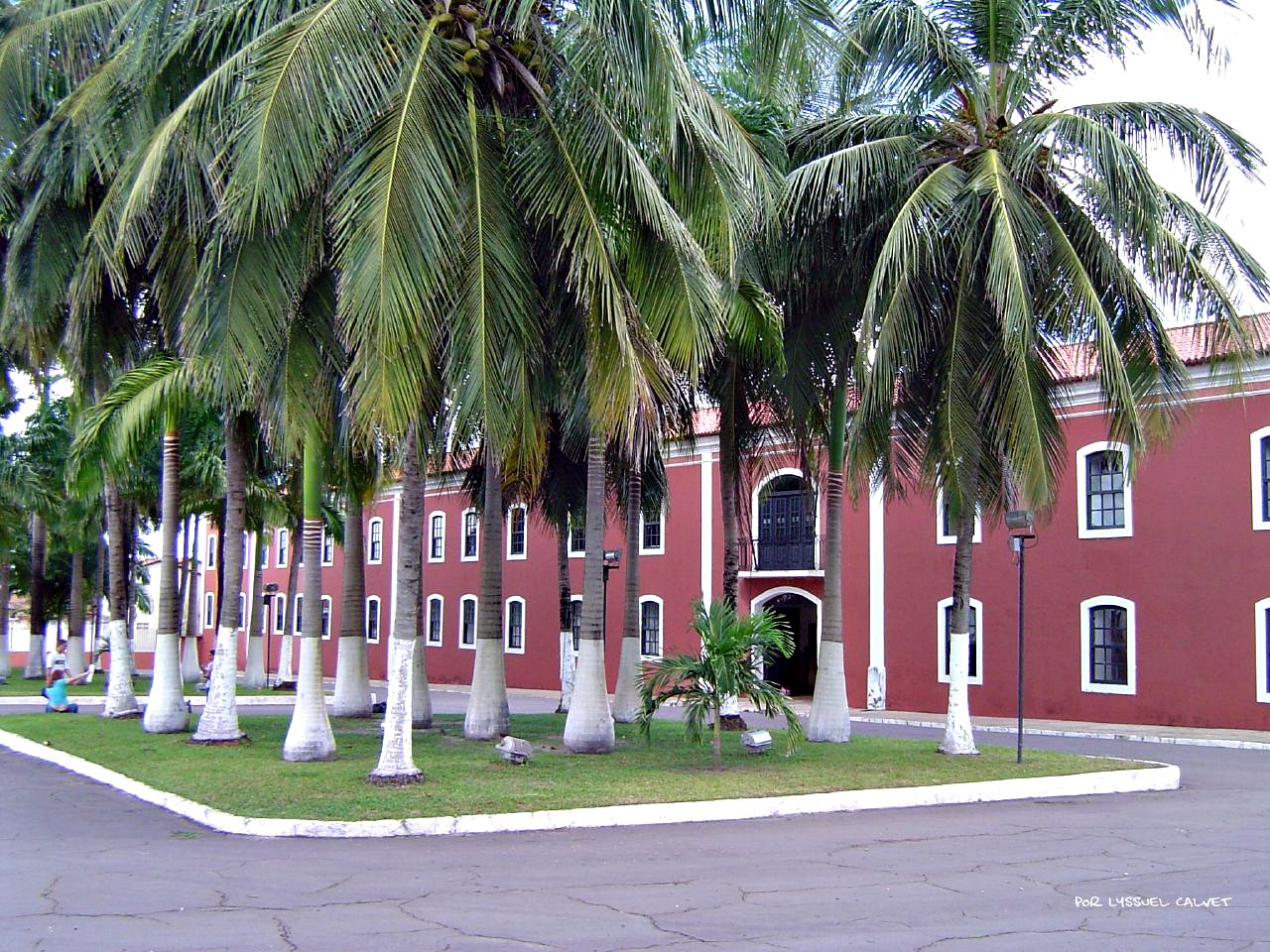
Convent of Mercês, São Luís

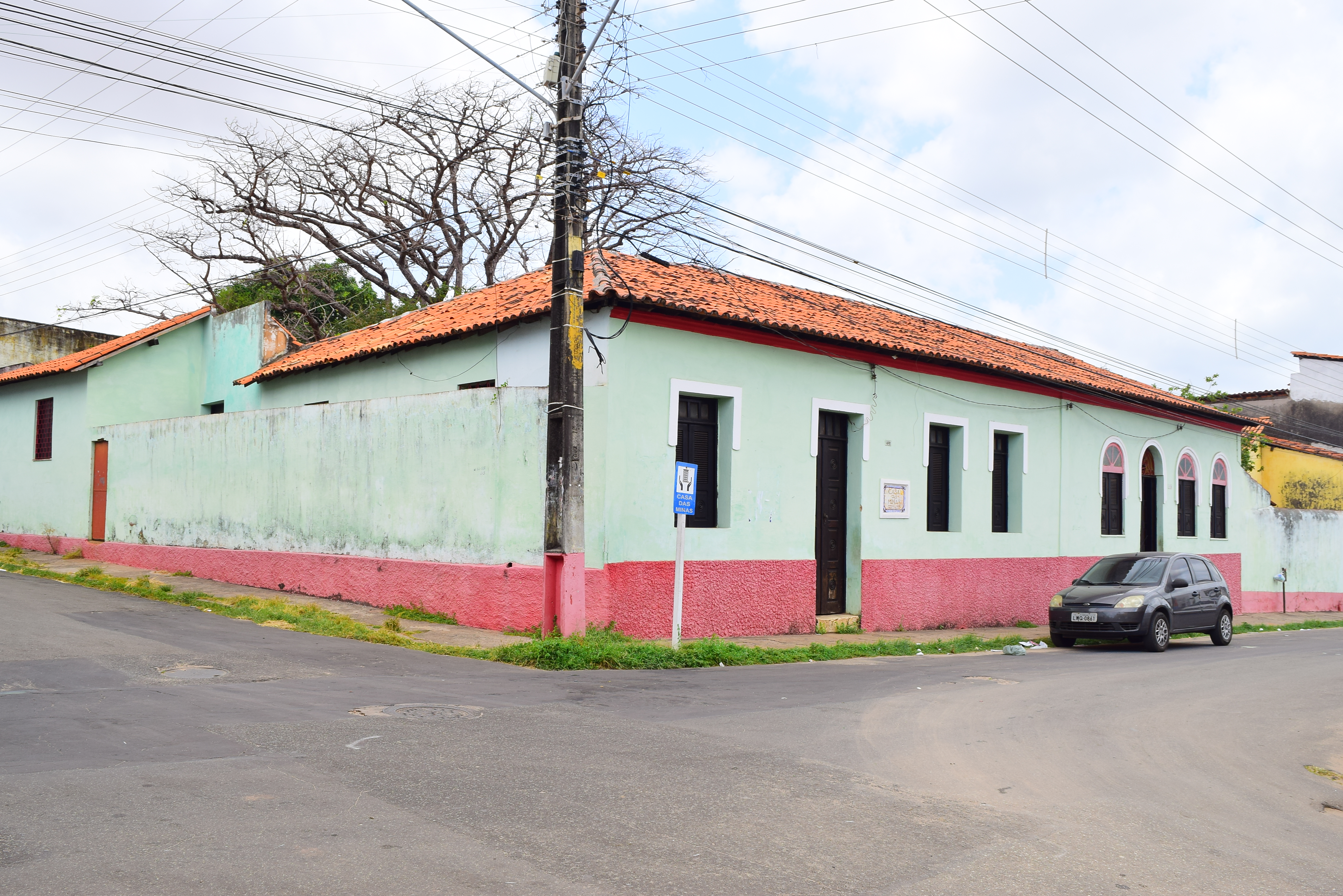
House of the Mines, São Luís

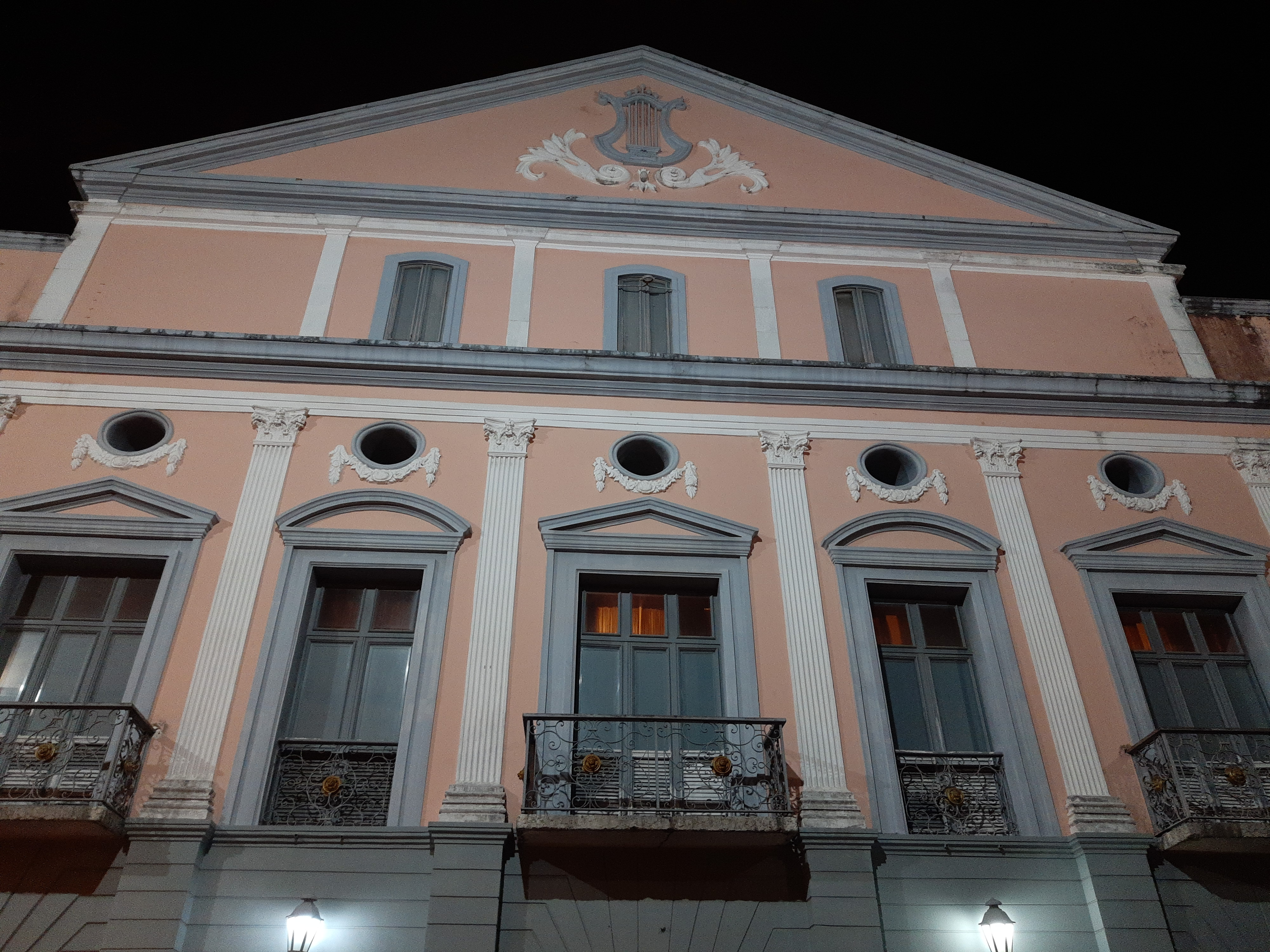
Artur Azevedo Theater, São Luís

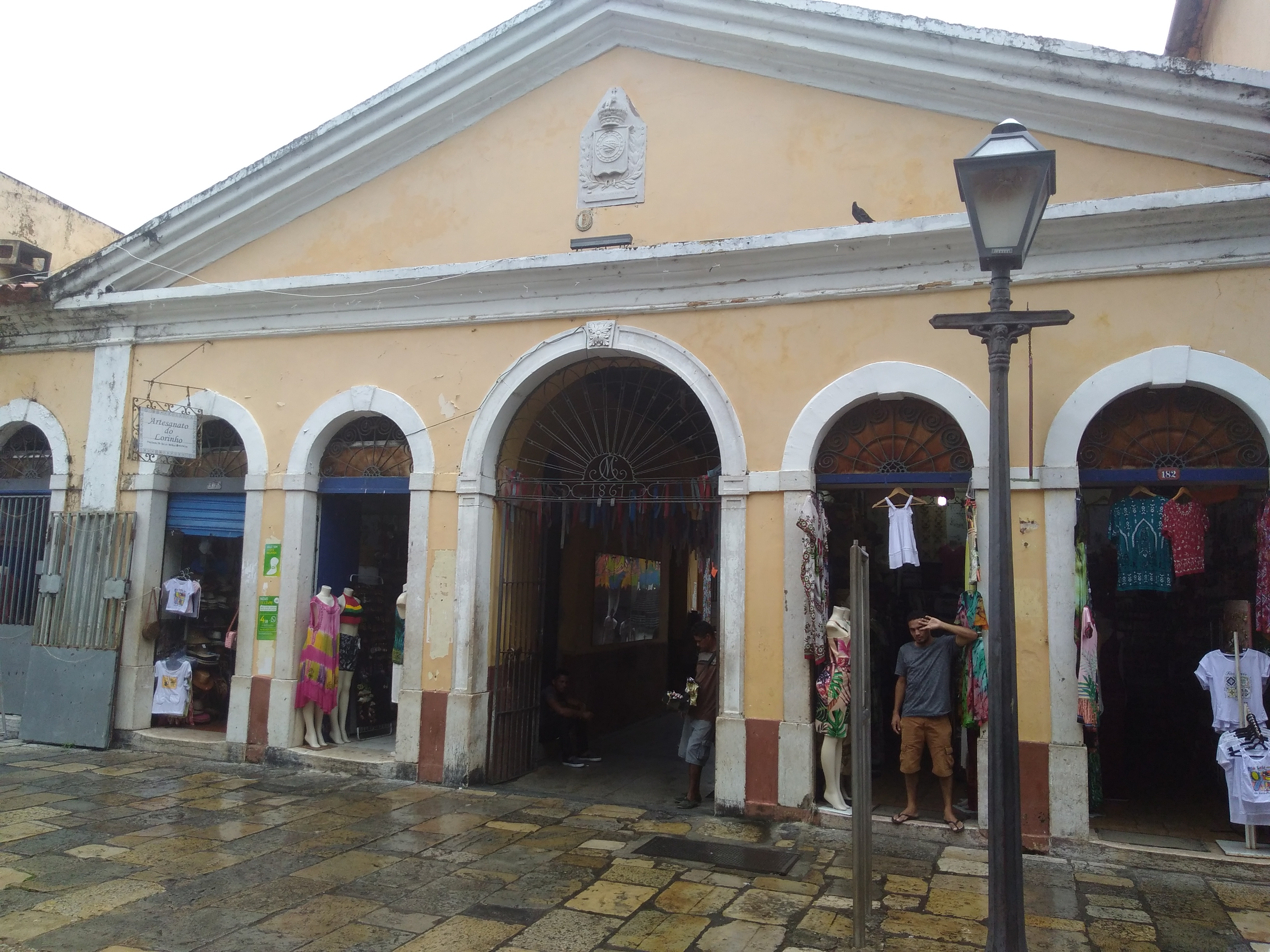
Tulhas Market, São Luís

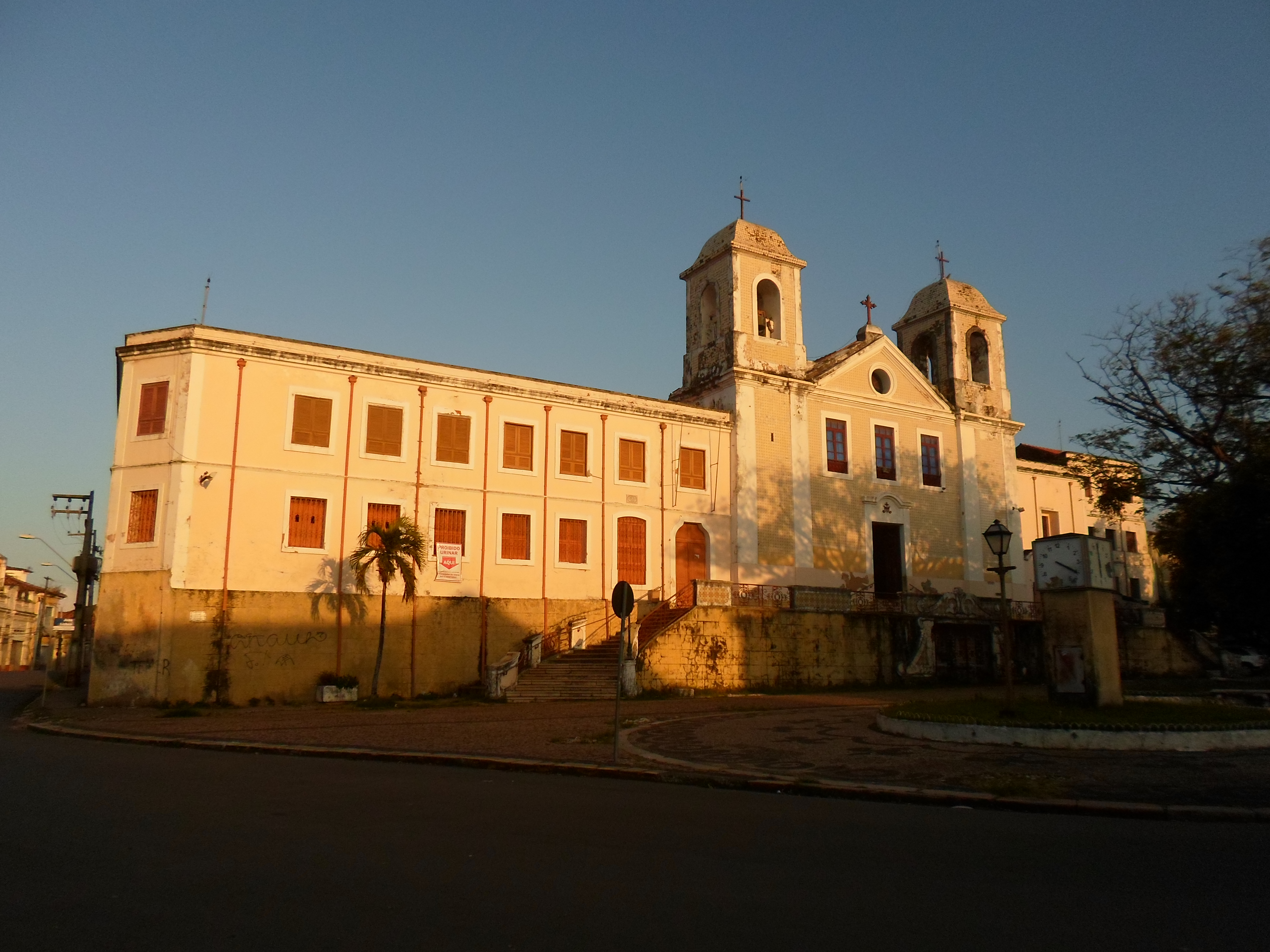
Convent and Church of Our Lady of Mount Carmel, São Luís
