= Axixá =

- Municipality
- Location in Maranhão state

- Location in Brazil
- Coordinates: 2°50′13″S 44°3′10″W
- Country: Brazil
- Region: Nordeste
- State: Maranhão
- Mesoregion: Norte Maranhense

Area
  - Total: 203.194 km^{2} (78.454 sq mi)

Population (2020)
  - Total: 12,183
  - Density: 59.957/km^{2} (155.29/sq mi)
- Time zone: UTC−3 (BRT)

not to be confused with Axixá do Tocantins in Tocantins State

Axixá is a municipality in the state of Maranhão in the Northeast region of Brazil. The main town lies on the left bank of the Munim River, upstream from Icatu.

The municipality contains part of the 1,535,310-hectare (3,793,800-acre) Upaon-Açu/Miritiba/Alto Preguiças Environmental Protection Area, created in 1992.

== See also ==
- List of municipalities in Maranhão
