= Presidente Juscelino, Maranhão =

Coordinates: 2.92778°S 44.065°W

Presidente Juscelino
- Municipality
- Country: Brazil
- Region: Nordeste
- State: Maranhão
- Mesoregion: Norte Maranhense

Population (2020)
  - Total: 12,838
- Time zone: UTC−3 (BRT)

Presidente Juscelino is a municipality in the state of Maranhão in the Northeast region of Brazil.

The municipality contains part of the 1,535,310-hectare (3,793,800-acre) Upaon-Açu/Miritiba/Alto Preguiças Environmental Protection Area, created in 1992.

== See also ==
- List of municipalities in Maranhão
