= Baía de São José =

Bay in Maranhão, Brazil

Coordinates: 2°38′S 44°04′W

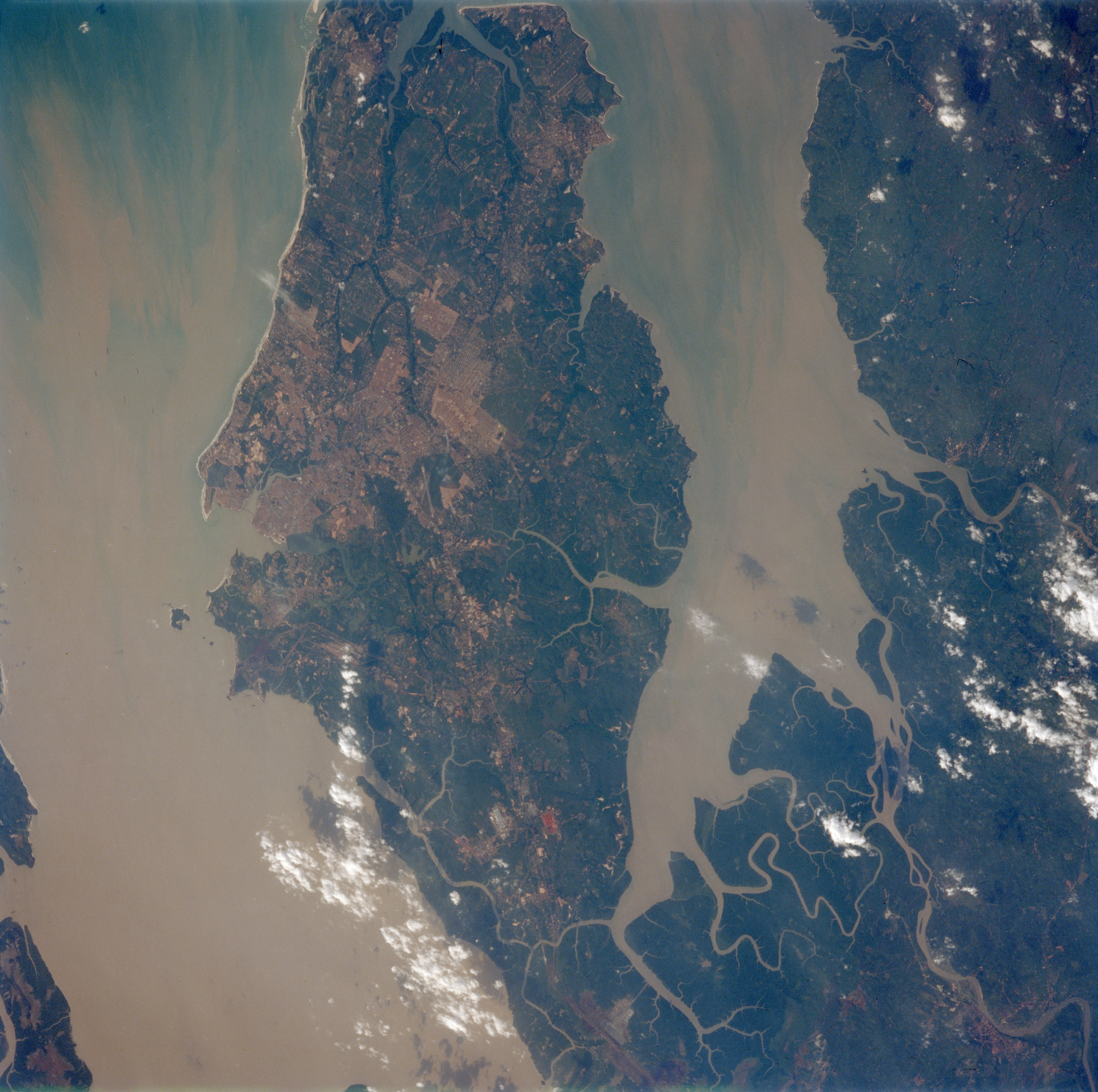
Upaon-Açu Island(center), São Marcos Bay(left), Arraial Bay(bottom), and Baía de São José(right), seen from satellite view.

The Baía de São José (Portuguese pronunciation: [baˈi.ɐ d(ʒi) sɐ̃w ʒuˈzɛ]) is a bay of the Atlantic Ocean in the state of Maranhão in northeastern Brazil.

The bay is an estuary which receives several rivers, including the Itapecuru and Munim.

São Luís Island, also known as Maranhão Island or Upaon-açu Island, separates the Baía de São José from the Baía de São Marcos just to the west. São Luís Island is home to São Luís, Maranhão's capital.
