= São Benedito do Rio Preto =

Coordinates: 3°20′S 43°35′W

- Municipality
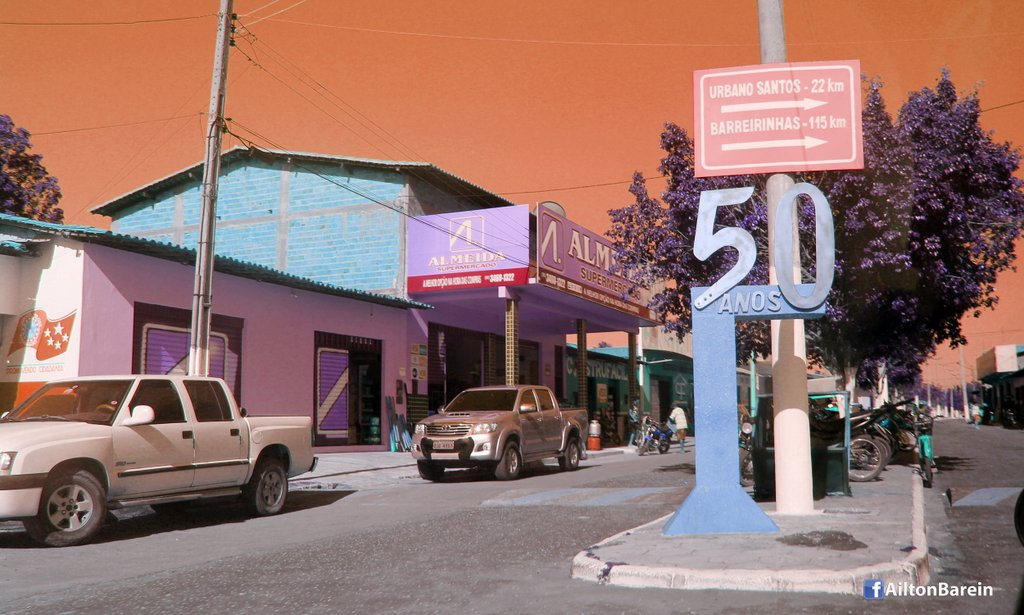

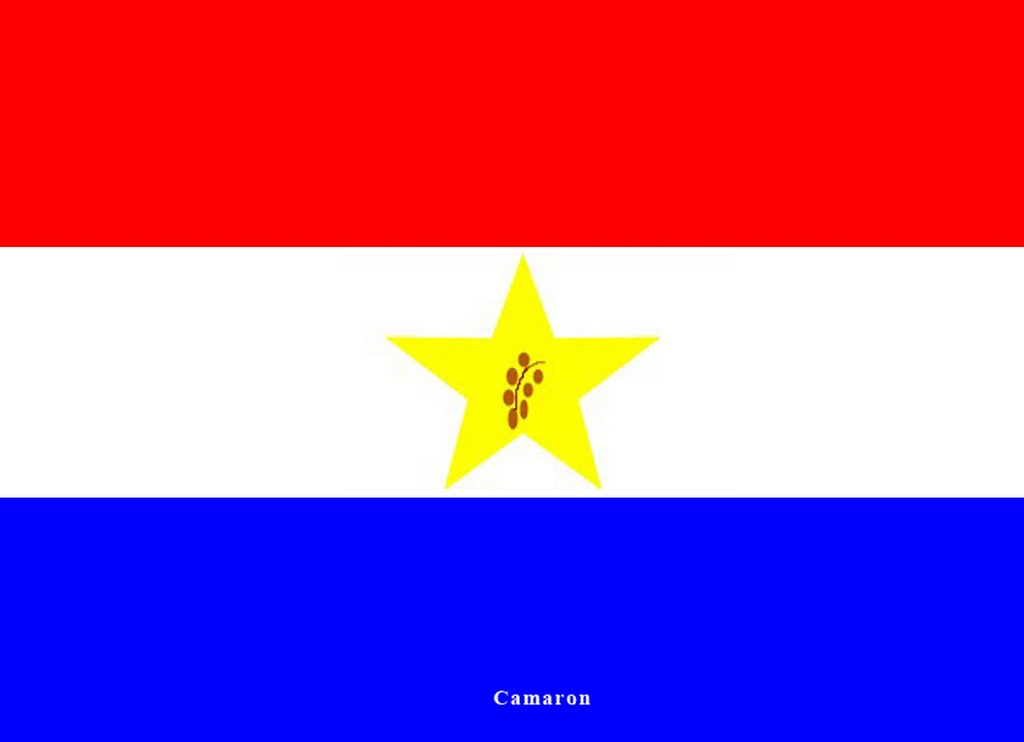
- Flag

- Country: Brazil
- Region: Nordeste
- State: Maranhão
- Mesoregion: Leste Maranhense

Population (2020)
  - Total: 18,717
- Time zone: UTC−3 (BRT)

São Benedito do Rio Preto is a municipality in the state of Maranhão in the Northeast region of Brazil.

The municipality lies in the Munim River basin. The municipality contains part of the 1,535,310-hectare (3,793,800-acre) Upaon-Açu/Miritiba/Alto Preguiças Environmental Protection Area, created in 1992.

== See also ==
- List of municipalities in Maranhão
