= Afonso Cunha =

Coordinates: 4.13278°S 43.3239°W

- Municipality
- Interactive map of Afonso Cunha
- Country: Brazil
- Region: Nordeste
- State: Maranhão
- Mesoregion: Leste Maranhense

Population (2020)
  - Total: 6,578
- Time zone: UTC−3 (BRT)

Afonso Cunha is a municipality in the state of Maranhão in the Northeast region of Brazil.

The municipality lies in the Munim River basin.

== See also ==
- List of municipalities in Maranhão
