= Baía de São Marcos =

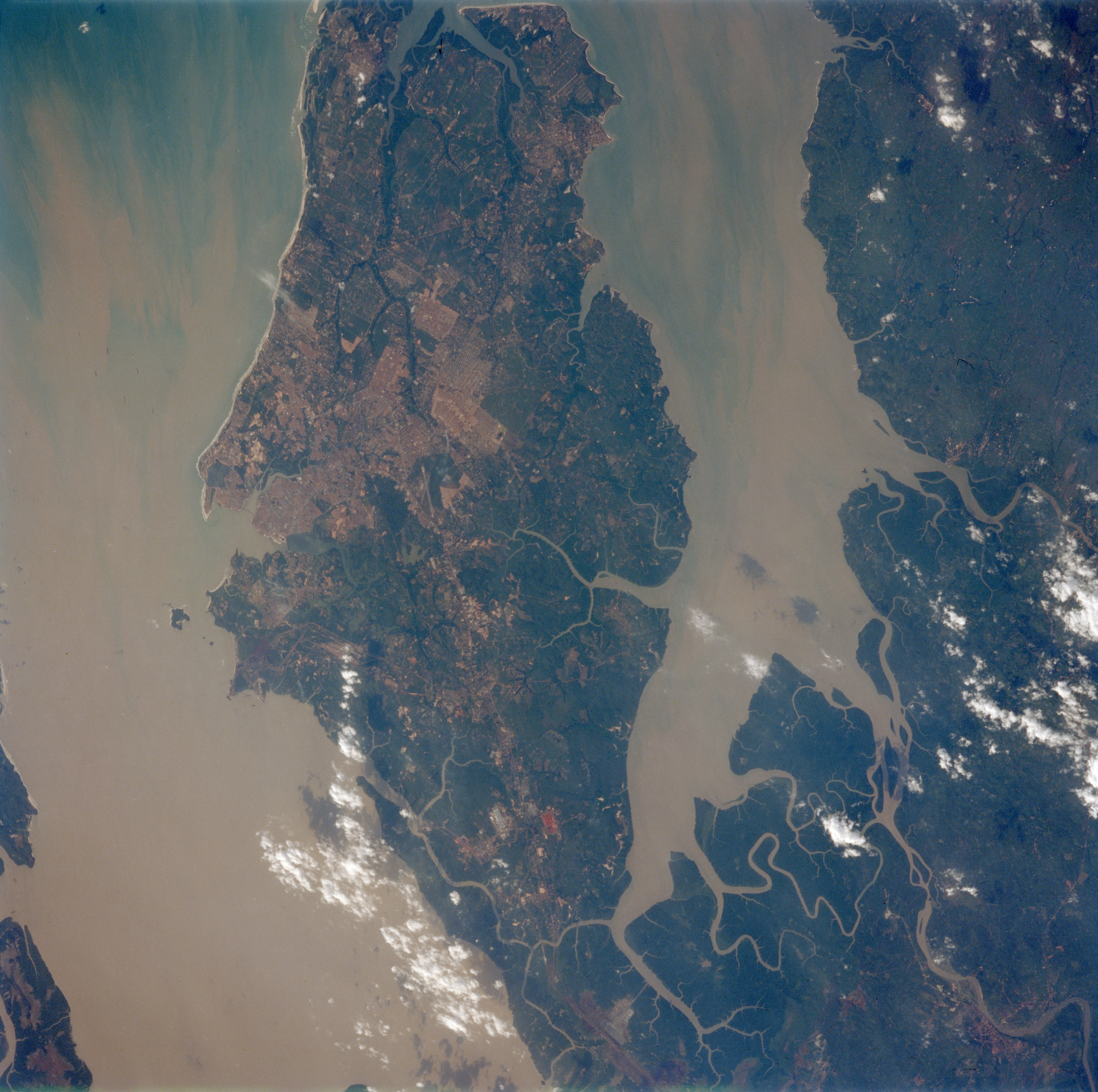

- Location within Brazil
- Coordinates: 2°36′S 44°28′W
- Type: bay, estuary
- Ocean/sea sources: Atlantic Ocean
- Basin countries: Brazil
- Max. length: 100 kilometres (62 mi)
- Max. width: 16 kilometres (9.9 mi)

The Baía de São Marcos is a bay of the Atlantic Ocean in Maranhão state of northeastern Brazil.

The bay is an estuary approximately 100 kilometres (62 mi) long and up to 16 kilometres (9.9 mi) wide. It receives several rivers, including the Grajaú, Mearim, and Pindaré. The Mearim is known for its pororoca, or tidal bore.

São Luís Island, also known as Maranhão Island, separates the Baía de São Marcos from the Baía de São Jose just to the east. São Luís Island is home to São Luís, Maranhão's capital.
