= São José de Ribamar =

Coordinates: 2°33′S 44°03′W

- city
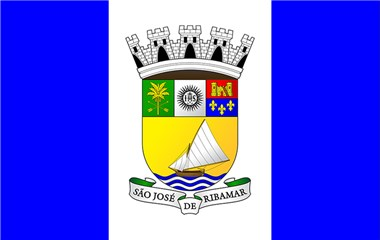
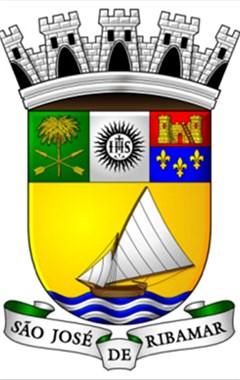
- Flag Coat of arms

- Location of São José de Ribamar in the state of Maranhão and Brazil
- Region: Nordeste
- State: Maranhão

Government
  - Mayor: Gil Cutrim (PDT)

Area
  - Total: 386.282 km^{2} (149.144 sq mi)

Population (2022 Brazilian census)
  - Total: 244,579
  - Estimate (2025): 259,164
  - Density: 633.162/km^{2} (1,639.88/sq mi)
- Time zone: UTC−3 (BRT)

Sao José de Ribamar is a Brazilian municipality in the Maranhão state. 259,164 was its estimated population in 2025. It is part of the São Luís Island together with São Luís, Raposa, and Paço do Lumiar.

The municipality contains part of the 1,535,310-hectare (3,793,800-acre) Upaon-Açu/Miritiba/Alto Preguiças Environmental Protection Area, created in 1992.
