= Mata Roma =

Coordinates: 3°37′S 43°07′W

- Municipality
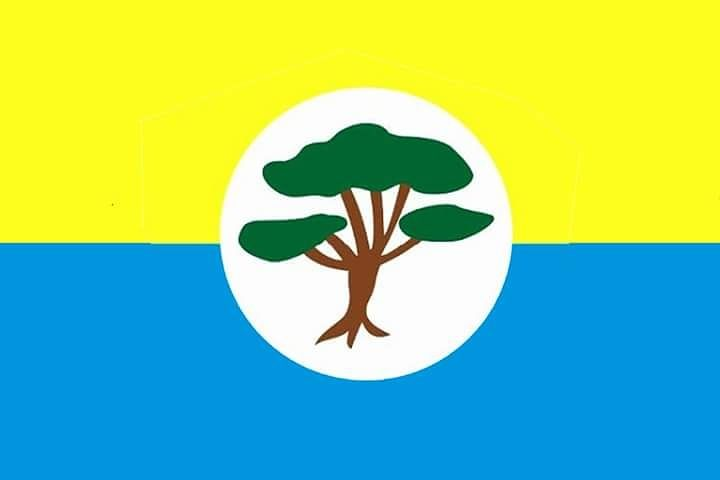
- Flag
- Interactive map of Mata Roma
- Country: Brazil
- Region: Nordeste
- State: Maranhão
- Mesoregion: Leste Maranhense

Population (2020)
  - Total: 16,977
- Time zone: UTC−3 (BRT)

Mata Roma is a municipality in the state of Maranhão in the Northeast region of Brazil. In 2020 it was estimated to have 16,977 inhabitants.

The municipality lies in the Munim River basin.

== See also ==
- List of municipalities in Maranhão
