= Cachoeira Grande =

Coordinates: 2.92694°S 44.0578°W

- Municipality
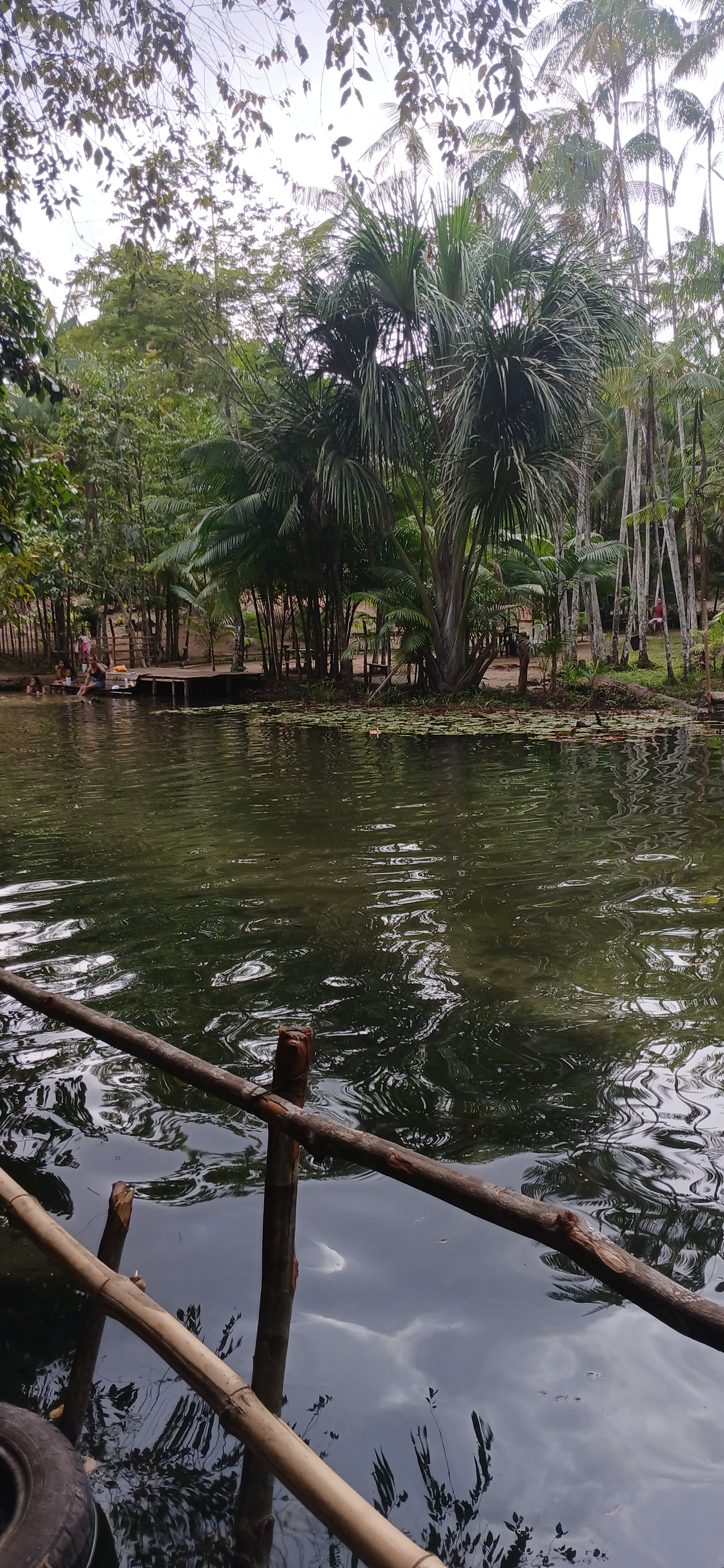

- Country: Brazil
- Region: Nordeste
- State: Maranhão
- Mesoregion: Norte Maranhense

Population (2020)
  - Total: 9,478
- Time zone: UTC−3 (BRT)

Cachoeira Grande is a municipality in the state of Maranhão in the Northeast region of Brazil.

The municipality lies in the Munim River basin. The municipality contains part of the 1,535,310-hectare (3,793,800-acre) Upaon-Açu/Miritiba/Alto Preguiças Environmental Protection Area, created in 1992.

== See also ==
- List of municipalities in Maranhão
