= Morros =

- Municipality
- Location in Maranhão state

- Location in Brazil
- Coordinates: 2°51′50″S 44°2′20″W
- Country: Brazil
- Region: Northeast
- State: Maranhão

Area
  - Total: 1,715 km^{2} (662 sq mi)

Population (2020)
  - Total: 19,572
  - Density: 11.41/km^{2} (29.56/sq mi)
- Time zone: UTC−3 (BRT)

Morros, Maranhão is a municipality in the state of Maranhão in the Northeast region of Brazil.

The municipality contains part of the 1,535,310-hectare (3,793,800-acre) Upaon-Açu/Miritiba/Alto Preguiças Environmental Protection Area, created in 1992.
