= Aldeias Altas =

Coordinates: 4.62778°S 43.4708°W

- Municipality
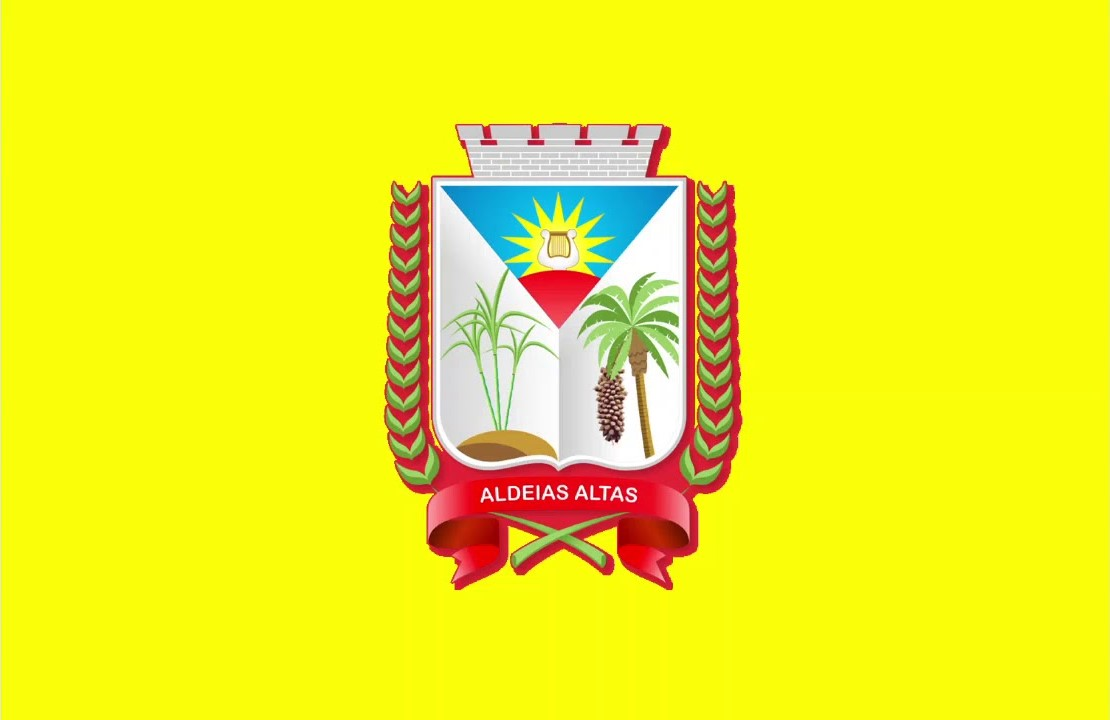
- Flag
- Interactive map of Aldeias Altas
- Country: Brazil
- Region: Nordeste
- State: Maranhão
- Mesoregion: Leste Maranhense

Population (2020)
  - Total: 26,757
- Time zone: UTC−3 (BRT)

Aldeias Altas is a municipality in the state of Maranhão in the Northeast region of Brazil.

== See also ==
- List of municipalities in Maranhão
