= Upaon-Açu/Miritiba/Alto Preguiças Environmental Protection Area =

Environmental protection area in the state of Maranhão, Brazil

- Área de Proteção Ambiental Upaon-Açu/Miritiba/Alto Preguiças
- IUCN category V (protected landscape/seascape)
- Location within Brazil
- Nearest city: Humberto de Campos, Maranhão
- Coordinates: 2°43′30″S 43°36′56″W
- Area: 1,535,310 ha (5,927.9 sq mi)
- Designation: Environmental protection area
- Created: 5 June 1992
- Administrator: Sema

The Upaon-Açu/Miritiba/Alto Preguiças Environmental Protection Area (Portuguese: Área de Proteção Ambiental Upaon-Açu/Miritiba/Alto Preguiças) is an environmental protection area in the state of Maranhão, Brazil.

== Location ==
The Upaon-Açu/Miritiba/Alto Preguiças Environmental Protection Area (APA) covers all or part of the municipalities of Urbano Santos (2.8%), São Luís (1.4%), São José de Ribamar (2.25%), São Benedito do Rio Preto (0.34%), Santo Amaro do Maranhão (5.87%), Santana do Maranhão (0.03%), Santa Rita (1.85%), Santa Quitéria do Maranhão (3.91%), Rosário (4.26%), Raposa (0.41%), Primeira Cruz (7.89%), Presidente Vargas (0.29%), Presidente Juscelino (2.2%), Paço do Lumiar (0.55%), Nina Rodrigues (0.05%), Morros (10.8%), Itapecuru Mirim (0.18%), Icatu (9.24%), Humberto de Campos (13.59%), Cachoeira Grande (4.32%), Belágua (3.18%), Barreirinhas (12.07%), Bacabeira (0.79%) and Axixá (1.3%) in the state of Maranhão.

The APA has an area of 1,535,310 hectares (3,793,800 acres). It adjoins the Lençóis Maranhenses National Park to the north and the Delta do Parnaíba Environmental Protection Area to the east.

== History ==
The Upaon-Açu/Miritiba/Alto Preguiças Environmental Protection Area was created by decree 12.428 of 5 June 1992 with objectives that included controlling use and occupation of the land, exploitation of natural resources, hunting and fishing, protection of fauna and flora, and maintenance of water quality. A 2011 report noted that the APA was not the target of ongoing public policies to protect its ecosystems. The management plan was completed in October 2014, allowing the Secretary of State for Environment and Natural Resources (Sema) to start conservation measures. At that time there was still no managing board.

== Environment ==
The APA contains elements of the Amazon rainforest (18%), cerrado (63%) and coastal marine (19%) biomes. Vegetation includes pioneer formations (47%), dense rainforest (7%), savanna-seasonal forest contact (1%). savanna-mixed rainforest contact (1%) and savanna-semi-desert-seasonal forest contact (25%). The APA is a birthplace and nursery for most species of coastal elasmobranchii, so deserves special care in management of fishing.

== Sources ==
- APA Upaon-Açu/Miritiba/Alto Preguiças (in Portuguese), ISA: Instituto Socioambiental
- Área de Proteção Ambiental Upaon Açu - Miritiba - Alto Preguiças (in Portuguese), Via Rural, archived from the original on May 7, 2009
- Correia, Fabiana Pereira (2011), "Estado do Maranhão e sua política de proteção ambiental" (PDF), Jornada Internacional de Politicas Publicas (in Portuguese)
- Sema recebe Plano de Manejo da APA Upaon-Açu/Miritiba/Alto Preguiças (in Portuguese), Governo do Maranhão, 17 October 2014
- Unidades de Conservação (in Portuguese), ZEE: Governo do Estado do Maranhão, archived from the original on 2017-01-29
