= Solar Bandeira =

House in Salvador, Bahia

- Solar Bandeira
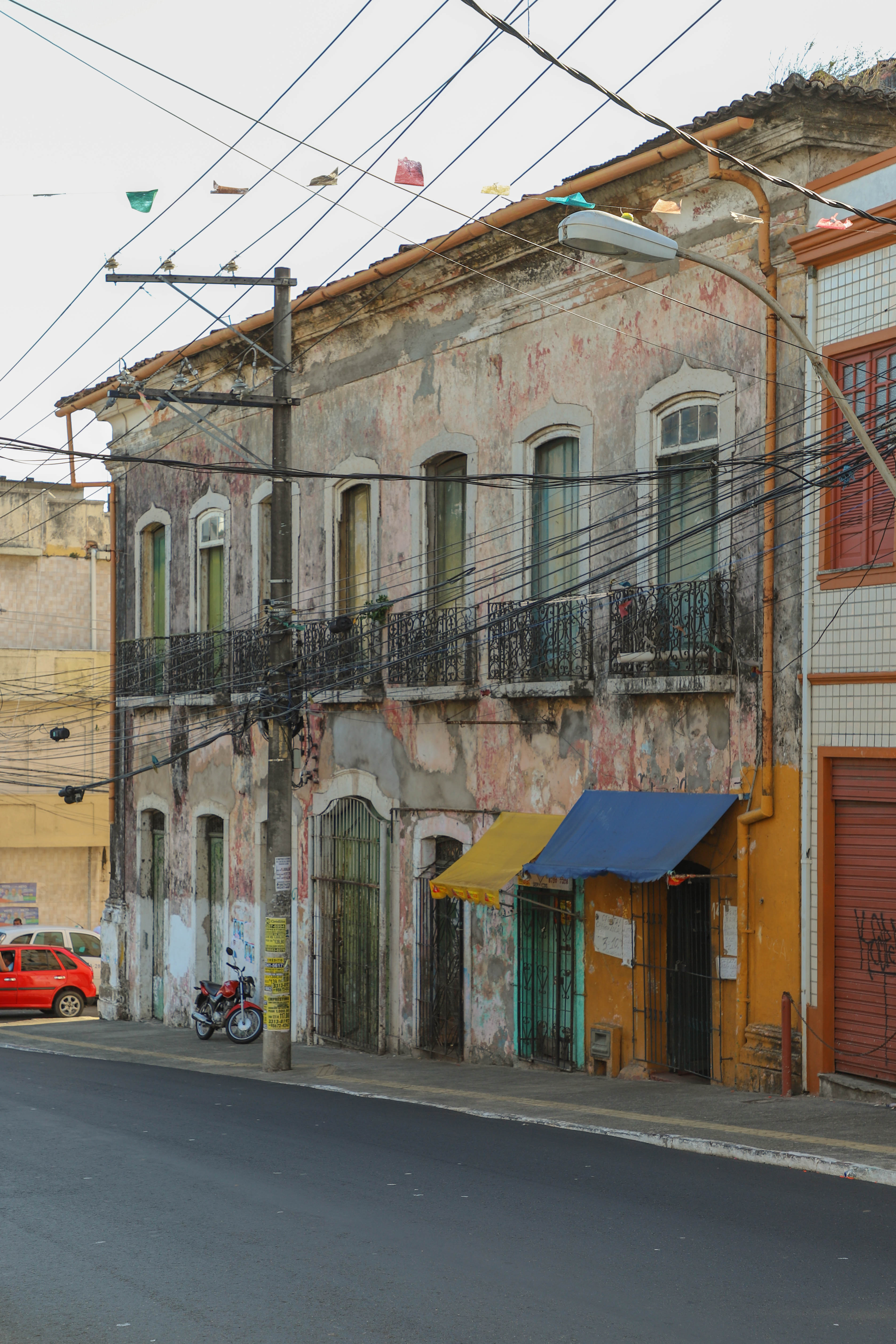
- Solar Bandeira, Soledade, Salvador, Bahia

- Location within Brazil

General information
- Location: Ladeira da Soledade, no. 126, Salvador, Bahia, Brazil
- Coordinates: 12.959003°S 38.500493°W
- Named for: Pedro Rodrigues Bandeira (1768-1835)

Technical details
- Floor count: 2

Solar Bandeira is a former manor house in Salvador, Brazil. It was built by Pedro Rodrigues Bandeira (1768-1835), a wealthy merchant and financier of Bahian forces during the Brazilian War of Independence. Solar Bandeira is located on the slope in the Soledade neighborhood, formerly a suburb of Salvador that included plantation and the Convent Our Lady of Solitude. The garden, which had rich mosaic work and a view of the Bay of All Saints, was called the "marvel and pride of Bahia" in the 18th and 19th century. Solar Bandeira, despite its protected status, is in an advanced state of ruin and may not be visited.

== History ==
Solar Bandeira dates to the second half of the 18th century, and belonged to Pedro Rodrigues Bandeira. Pedro Rodrigues Bandeira was born in Bahia in 1768. He became the largest exporter of tobacco and brandy in Colonial Brazil, exporting his goods from warehouses in Cachoeira, in the interior of the Recôncavo, to Africa, India, and Portugal. Bandeira was reputedly one of the richest men in Salvador; he financed Bahian forces against the Portuguese during the Brazilian War of Independence in the 1820s; Brazilian troops occupied Salvador on July 2, 1823 after the Battle of Itaparica.

Solar Bandeira was one of many buildings owned by Pedro Rodrigues Bandeira. An inventory of the building taken in 1835 states that a courtyard on the hill was used for the stables, coach house, and kitchen of the house; the attic was used for slaves quarters. Solar Bandeira appears in a watercolor by Julius Nacher in 1879.

== Structure ==
Sola Bandeira has two stories and an attic. Its exterior walls are of stone masonry and interior walls of brick. The first floor had a wide portal at its center with three large, barred windows at either side; the first-floor windows have been converted to doors. The seven windows of the second floor, corresponding to the doors of the first floor, of the house look out onto the Ladeira da Soledade and have balconets. The windows are framed in lioz stone imported from Portugal. The interior, notably door frames and windows, were of carved wood. The rear of the house has a broad, panoramic view of the Bay of All Saints.

Solar Bandeira was noted for its garden and rich mosaics of the type known as embrechado, shells, stones, crockery fragments, and other materials were utilized for the technique. The garden of Solar Bandeira had embrechado mosaic work of crockery of Moorish design; it decorated walls, seats, and flower beds of the garden. The garden is in an advanced state of ruin, and little of the mosaic remains. A similar garden was found at the Casa de Azulejo, built in the mid-19th century; the House at Rua Felipe Camarão, no. 34 retains its fine garden embrechado work.

== Protected status ==
Solar Bandeira was declared a classified property of Bahia by the Artistic and Cultural Institute of Bahia (IPAC) in 2010. It is additionally part of the Area of Contiguous Protection of Soledade (Área de Proteção Contígua--Soledade).

== Access ==
Solar Bandeira is in an advanced state of ruin and may not be visited.
