= Diocese of Brejo =

Catholic ecclesiastical territory

Coordinates: 3.6834°S 42.7513°W

Diocese of Brejo Dioecesis Breiensis

Catholic

Location
- Country: Brazil
- Ecclesiastical province: São Luís do Maranhão

Statistics
- Area: 23,340 km^{2} (9,010 sq mi)
- Population: Total; Catholics: (as of 2004); 448,000; 410,000 (91.5%)

Information
- Rite: Latin Rite
- Established: 14 September 1971 (55 years ago)
- Cathedral: Catedral Nossa Senhora da Conceição

Current leadership
- Pope: Leo XIV
- Bishop: José Valdeci Santos Mendes
- Metropolitan Archbishop: Gilberto Pastana de Oliveira
- Bishops emeritus: Valter Carrijo, S.D.S.

The Roman Catholic Diocese of Brejo (Latin: Dioecesis Breiensis) is a diocese located in the city of Brejo in the ecclesiastical province of São Luís do Maranhão in Brazil.

== History ==
- 14 September 1971: Established as Diocese of Brejo from Metropolitan Archdiocese of São Luís do Maranhão

== Bishops ==
- Bishops of Brejo (Latin Rite)
  - Afonso de Oliveira Lima, S.D.S. † (29 Nov 1971 - 25 Sep 1991) Retired
  - Valter Carrijo, S.D.S. (25 Sep 1991 Succeeded - 5 May 2010) Retired
  - José Valdeci Santos Mendes (5 May 2010 – present)

=== Coadjutor bishop ===
- Valter Carrijo, S.D.S. (1989-1991)
