= Benedito Leite Public Library =

Library in São Luis, Brazil

- Biblioteca Pública Benedito Leite
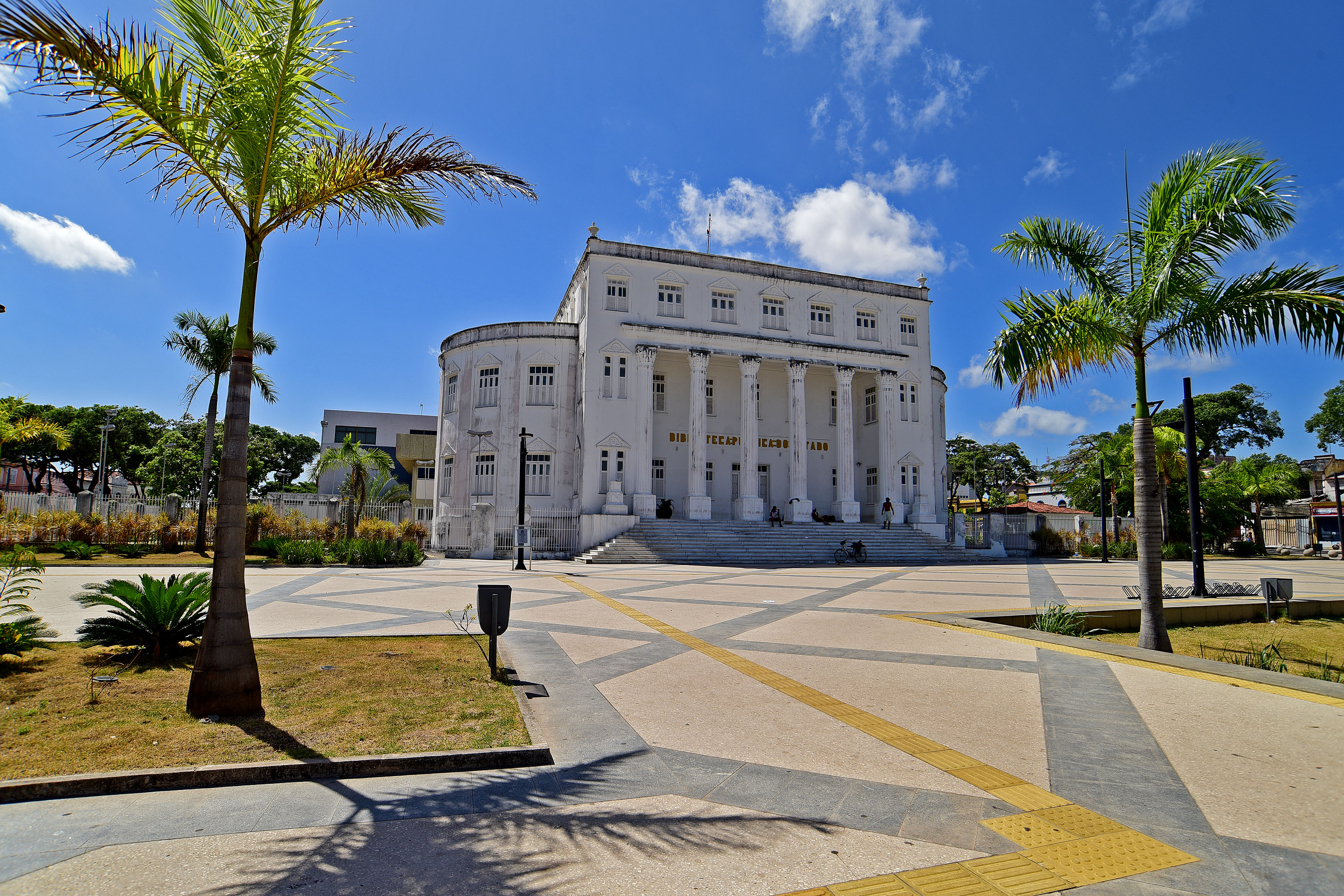
- 2°31′46.74″S 44°17′43.08″W
- Location: Praça do Pantheon, São Luís, Maranhão, Brazil

Other information

The Benedito Leite Public Library (Portuguese: Biblioteca Pública Benedito Leite) is located on the Praça do Pantheon, in the historic center of São Luís. It is the largest public library in Maranhão and the 11th largest in Brazil, with a collection of approximately 140,000 national and international works.

== History ==
On April 24, 1918, Governor José Joaquim Marques had issued Law No. 816, authorizing the construction or adaptation of a building specifically to house the Public Library; however, no action was taken.
