= Church of Pantaleão =

- Parish Church of Saint Joseph (Paróquia São José e São Pantaleão)
- Igreja de Pantaleão
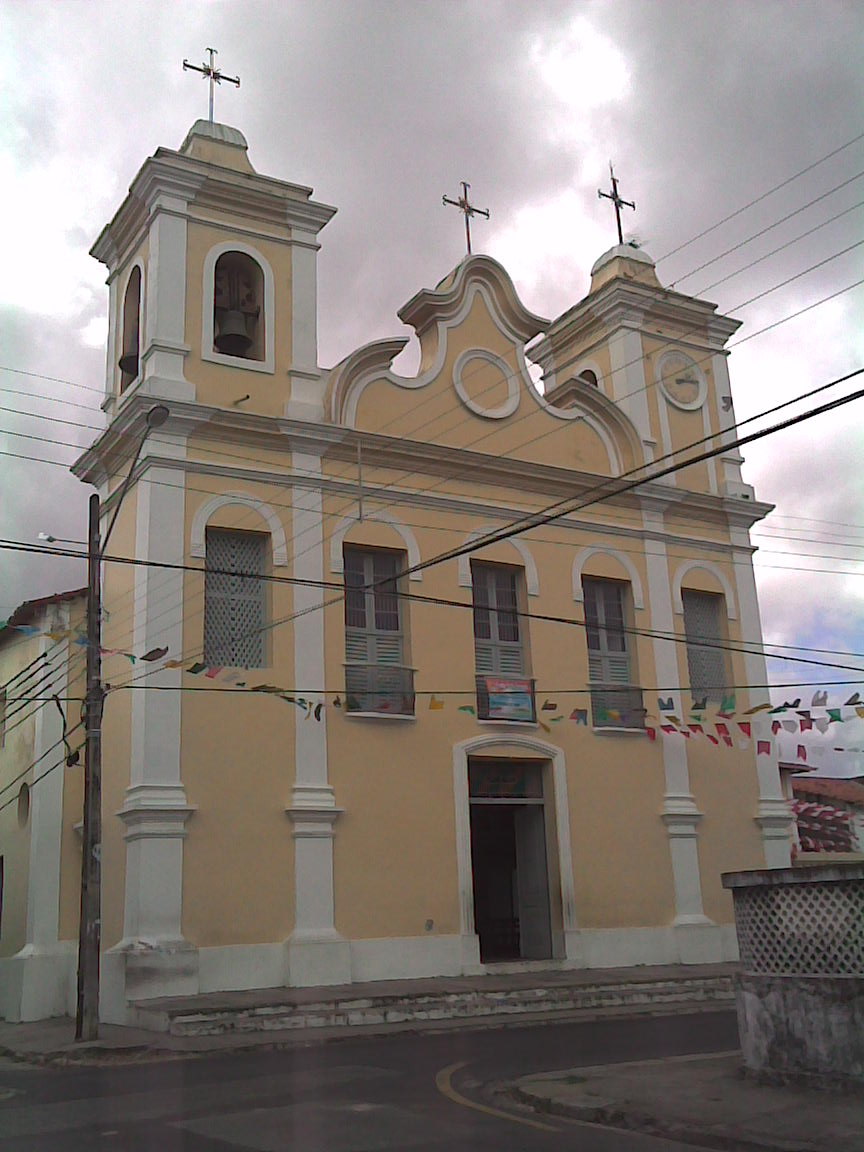

- Church of Pantaleão in Brazil
- 2.535556°S 44.297778°W
- Location: São Luís, Maranhão
- Address: Rua São Pantaleão, sn°, São Luís - MA, 65015-460
- Country: Brazil
- Language: Portuguese
- Denomination: Roman Catholic
- Tradition: Roman Rite

History
- Founded: 15 June 1780
- Dedication: Saint Joseph
- Consecrated: March 19, 1817

Architecture
- Functional status: Active
- Architectural type: Baroque
- Years built: 1780-1817

Administration
- Archdiocese: Roman Catholic Archdiocese of São Luís do Maranhão

Clergy
- Archbishop: Gilberto Pastana de Oliveira
- Priest: Padre Manoel Assunção Nunes Filho

The Church of Pantaleão (Portuguese: Igreja de Pantaleão) is an 18th-century Roman Catholic church in São Luís, Maranhão, Brazil. It was consecrated as the Church of Saint John of the City (Igreja de São José a Cidade), but is now the Church of São Pantaleão and Saint Joseph (Igreja de São José e São Pantaleão). The church is dedicated to Saint Joseph. It belongs to the Roman Catholic Archdiocese of São Luís do Maranhão, and is the parish church of the Saint Joseph and Saint Pantaleon Parish (Paróquia São José e São Pantaleão). It was built by Pantaleão Rodrigues de Castro and Pedro da Cunha, wealthy residents of São Luís. Construction began on the church in 1780 during the Portuguese colonial period; it was only completed in 1817, shortly before the Independence of Brazil in 1822. Rodrigues and Da Cunha died before the completion of the church, but the work was continued by their sons and heirs.

The Church of Pantaleão was built in the late Baroque style, with a plain façade flanked by monumental towers. The church has a single portal and little exterior decoration. Fine wrought iron exterior elements were added to numerous buildings in São Luís in the late 19th century; the Pantaleão church has an ensemble of wrought iron balconettes and a transom with the insignia of the Holy House of Mercy. Its interior is simple and few historic architectural elements remain. The church is an integral property of the Historic Centre of São Luís, a UNESCO World Heritage Site.

== Name ==
Pantaleão Rodrigues de Castro and Pedro da Cunha dedicated the church under the name Church to Saint Joseph of the city (Igreja do São José da Cidade). It was popularly known as the "Church of São Pantaleão" (Igreja de São Pantaleão) from the beginning of its construction. It was not dedicated to Saint Pantaleon; the name is a reference to Pantaleão Rodrigues de Castro, the co-founder of the church. Pantaleão Rodrigues and Pedro da Cunha renamed the "Church of Saint Joseph of Mercy" (Igreja de São José da Misericórdia) at the time of its donation to the Holy House of Mercy in 1793.

The church, however, retained its popular name, "Church of São Pantaleão", throughout its history. The church today is known as the Church of São Pantaleão and Saint Joseph (Igreja de São José e São Pantaleão), and is the parish church of the Saint Joseph and Saint Pantaleon Parish (Paróquia São José e São Pantaleão).

== Location ==
The Church of Pantaleão is located in a densely urbanized area of the Historic Center of São Luís. It was placed on a corner lot at Rua Pantaleão and Rua da Cotavia, long narrow streets of the late Portuguese colonial period. The building is oriented towards Rua Pantaleão, with a long lateral façade on Rua da Cotavia. While monumental, the façade of the church sits flush with other buildings on both streets, and lacks a church yard. There are numerous historic buildings near the Church of Pantaleão; it directly faces the Grupo Escolar.

== Timeline ==
- 1612 - The colony of Saint-Louis founded by the French as part of Equinoctial France
- 1620 - Portuguese found São Luís on site of Saint-Louis
- 1641 - Dutch occupation of São Luís as part of Dutch Brazil, followed by desertion and destruction of the city
- 1644 - Portuguese re-occupation of São Luís
- 1755 - The Grão Pará and Maranhão Company established by Marquis of Pombal, and subsequent economic expansion in São Luís
- 1780 - June 15. Sacred mass and start of construction of church structure by Pantaleão Rodrigues de Castro and Pedro da Cunha under the name Church of Saint Joseph of the city (Igreja de São José da Cidade)
- 1782 - Pantaleão Rodrigues possibly seeks new site for church on Rua da Santa Rita
- 1792 - July 14. Donation of church to the Holy House of Mercy
- 1794 - May 10. City Council grants land for expansion of church site
- 1804 - November 5. Church reported in ruins, request for transfer of burials to other locations
- 1805 - São Pantaleão Cemetery placed at back of the building
- 1817 - March 10. Blessing of the completed Church of São Pantelão
  - March 17. Placement of image of Saint Joseph in church
  - March 19. Great gathering of followers and festival to celebrate opening of church
- 1829 - Foundling wheel placed in the church by the Holy House of Mercy
- 1830 - Bones of Pantaleão Rodrigues transferred to the church
- 1833 - Church bells purchased from the Vicar of Alcântara
- 1852 - Reliquary image of Saint Severa brought from Italy and placed in Church of São Pantelão
- 1863 - Restoration of the side walls, choir, and cross arch
- 1894 - Wrought iron elements placed on exterior of church; restoration of external plastering and interior painting
- 1946 - Holy House of Mercy cedes orphanage to Casa das Missões of São José and church to the Archbishop of São Luís
- 1949 - Electrical and lighting installed in church; main altar rebuilt, preserving the primitive style
- 1952 - Two side altars renovated, but retain plain style
- 1976 - Renovations of Father André Koning result in loss of historic characteristics of interior and exterior of structure
- 2015 - Further renovation and painting of exterior

== History ==
The Church of Pantaleão is one of the oldest church structures in São Luís, built in the late Portuguese colonial period, but only completed in 1817, shortly before the Independence of Brazil in 1822.

=== 18th century ===
The church was built by two wealthy residents of São Luís, Pantaleão Rodrigues de Castro and Pedro da Cunha. They laid a foundation stone on June 15, 1780, in a ceremony led by Father João Duarte da Costa, governor of the Bishopric and Precentor of the Cathedral of São Luís. The church was dedicated to Saint Joseph under the name the Church of Saint Joseph of the city (Igreja de São José da Cidade). Construction began the same year, but was possibly delayed in 1782 when Pantaleão Rodrigues sought to build another chapel to Saint Joseph on Rua da Santa Rita. Father João Duarte da Costa filed the request with the authorities in São Luís, but its outcome is unknown. Pedro da Cunha died in 1789 and the work was continued by Pantaleão de Castro and his son, Manoel Rodrigues de Castro, Knight of the Order of Christ and Lieutenant Colonel of the foot regiment.

Pantaleão de Castro and Manoel Rodrigues de Castro donated the church, still incomplete, to the Holy House of Mercy on July 14, 1793. The Holy House paid 1$280 reis for the deed, and sought to build both a hospital and church on the site. The donors offered an image of Saint Joseph to the church on the condition that the founders would be buried in the church, and that the saint would be celebrated annually. The church opened in 1817, but lacked enough space in front of the church for a public mass; the Holy House, accordingly, decided to purchase part of the land in front of the church. It was ultimately donated by Gabriel Raimundo Lapemberg, his brothers, and Bernardo Pereira de Berredo. On May 10, 1794, the City Council granted land measuring 43 fathoms in front and 24 fathoms on the side, in front of Rua do Passeio and at the back of the temple, for its expansion.

=== 19th century ===
The church was reported in ruins by a report dated November 5, 1804. Father José João Beckman e Caldas received the order to transfer the remains of those who had been buried there to another church or cemetery. A cemetery, the São Pantaleão Cemetery, was placed behind the church the following year because of overcrowding at the Municipal Cemetery and the Misericórdia Cemetery in Largo do Palácio. The church was rebuilt and completed over the following years. The image of the patron saint of the church, Saint Joseph, was placed on the high altar on March 17, 1817; the church was consecrated on March 19, 1817, to a great gathering of followers, a festival, and solemn mass. The first church ornaments were donated by Brigadier José Gonçalves da Silva. Pantaleão Rodrigues died before the opening, and despite his wishes, was buried at the Carmelite Convent. His remains were ultimately transferred to the church in 1830.

A foundling's wheel (roda de expostos, or roda dos enjeitados) was installed in the church in 1829. The foundling's wheel emerged in Portugal and spread to municipalities across the country; it spread to Brazil and foundling's wheels, where it existed until the 1950s. The first foundling's wheel in Brazil was placed at the Church and Santa Casa da Misericórdia in Salvador in 1734. Children placed in the foundling's wheel were fed, raised, and sent for adoption, institutionalization, or work.

Church bells were purchased in 1833 from Alcântara, in a municipality across the Bay of São Marcos. Construction of a parish church in Alcântara began in the early 18th century, but was abandoned and its stonework and bells were sold by the Vicar of Alcântara. After their transfer to São Luís the bells were repaired in Portugal by Father Tiago Zwarthoed, a Dutch Lazarist priest. São Luís was struck by smallpox and cholera epidemics between 1854 and 1856. The cemetery behind the Pantaleão was too small to accommodate the great number of burials. A new Cemetery of São Pantaleão (Cemitério São Pantaleão) opened in 1855, south of the building in the Belira neighborhood.^{A} The first restoration work on the church was carried out in 1863 on the side walls, choir, and cross arch.

The relics of Saint Severa were transferred from Italy in 1847. An image of Saint Severa, dressed as a girl of the 19th century, has bone pieces from the feet, hands, and head of the saint embedded in the image. The image and relics remain an essential element of the church property. The church's fine wrought iron balconettes and transom were placed in 1894, and are part of the rich heritage of wrought iron design in the Historic Center of São Luís of the same period.

=== 20th century ===
The Holy House of Mercy retained ownership of the church and orphanage until 1946. At that time the orphanage was transferred to the Casa das Missões of São José and the church to the Archbishop of São Luís. Several restorations during the 19th and 20th centuries kept the church in good condition. The electrical and lighting systems of the church were modernized in 1949; the main altar was restored in the same period, but retained its original plain style. Two side altars were similarly restored in 1852, also with a plain style. An unsuccessful renovation by Father André Koning in 1976, however, resulted in the loss of historic characteristics church structure, internally and externally. The building was again renovated in 2015 and the exterior painted in its current color.

== Legend of the enchanted serpent ==
A complex water system of submerged canals was placed in the Historic Center of São Luís at the end of the 18th century. A legend emerged in the same period that a large, enchanted serpent lives in the subterranean water system, and grows without stopping; the head of the serpent is below the Ribeirão Fountain, its belly below the Carmelite Convent, and its tail below the Church of Pantaleão. By the same legend, when the enchanted serpent grows enough that its head meets the tail, it will awaken and destroy the Island of São Luís.

== Structure ==
The Church of Pantaleão was built in a late, simple Baroque style. It is characterized by a plain façade at center, is flanked by towers on both sides, and crowned by a pediment. It is vertically divided by unadorned pilasters. The façade has a single, unadorned portal at center with a straight lintel and depressed arch frame. A wrought iron transom in the portal has the inscription: "SCM 1895".^{B}

There are three choir windows with straight lintels above the portal and below the entablature. Each tower has a smaller window placed at the same level as those of the choir. The choir windows have balconettes of fine wrought iron, while the tower windows are filled with wooden latticework in a herringbone design.

Each tower has a quadrangular base with prominent cornerstones. One tower has a bell gable with opens to four sides, the other has clocks and no openings. Both are topped by squat pyramids and a crucifix. An inscription on the bell dates it to 1833. The pediment, surmounted by an iron crucifix, is surrounded by cornices and has a circle in high relief on the tympanum. The pediment, like the towers, is surmounted by a crucifix in iron.

=== Interior ===
The interior of the church is simple, with little ornamentation. It has a floor with hydraulic tiles. The remains of Saint Severa, brought from Portugal in the 19th century remain an important feature of the church. The altar consists of a curtain that accompanies the apse, with a concrete table and a metal tabernacle topped by a wooden cross. The choir is made of wood and protected by an iron grille. The internal walls are covered with industrial tiles.

=== Relics of Saint Severa ===
The Church of Pantaleão is noted for the relics of Saint Severa, a Roman virgin and martyr of the beginning of the Christianity period. Pope Pius IX donated relics of Saint Severa to the church in 1848 via Friar Fidelis de Monte Sano of the Capuchin Apostolic Missionaries in Brazil. Friar Fidelis offered a wax image of Saint Severa dressed as an Italian girl of the period with ex ossibus (of the bones) fragments placed in the feet, hands, and head. The relics were initially offered to the former Church of Saint James in the Madre de Deus neighborhood, but placed in the Church of Saint Pantaleão. The relics remain important to the devotees and faithful. A legend relates that if the image of pierced with a pin, blood will flow from the spot, a symbol of the true incorrupt body of Saint Severa. The full remains of Saint Severa are located in San Stefano del Sole, Italy.

== Protected status ==
Individual protected status of the Church of Pantaleão by the state of Maranhão or municipal government of São Luís is unclear. The church is, however, an integral property of the Historic Center of São Luís, listed by the State of Maranhão (1974) and as a UNESCO World Heritage Site (1997).

== Access ==
The Church of Pantaleão is open to the public and may be visited.

== Footnotes ==
A.It is now also known as the Gavião Cemetery.
B."SCM" refers to the Santa Casa de Misericórdia, or the Holy House of Mercy in English.
