= Chapel of Laranjeiras =

Chapel of Saint Joseph of the Quinta das Laranjeiras
- Chapel of Laranjeiras, Chapel of Saint Joseph
- Capel do São José da Quinta das Laranjeiras
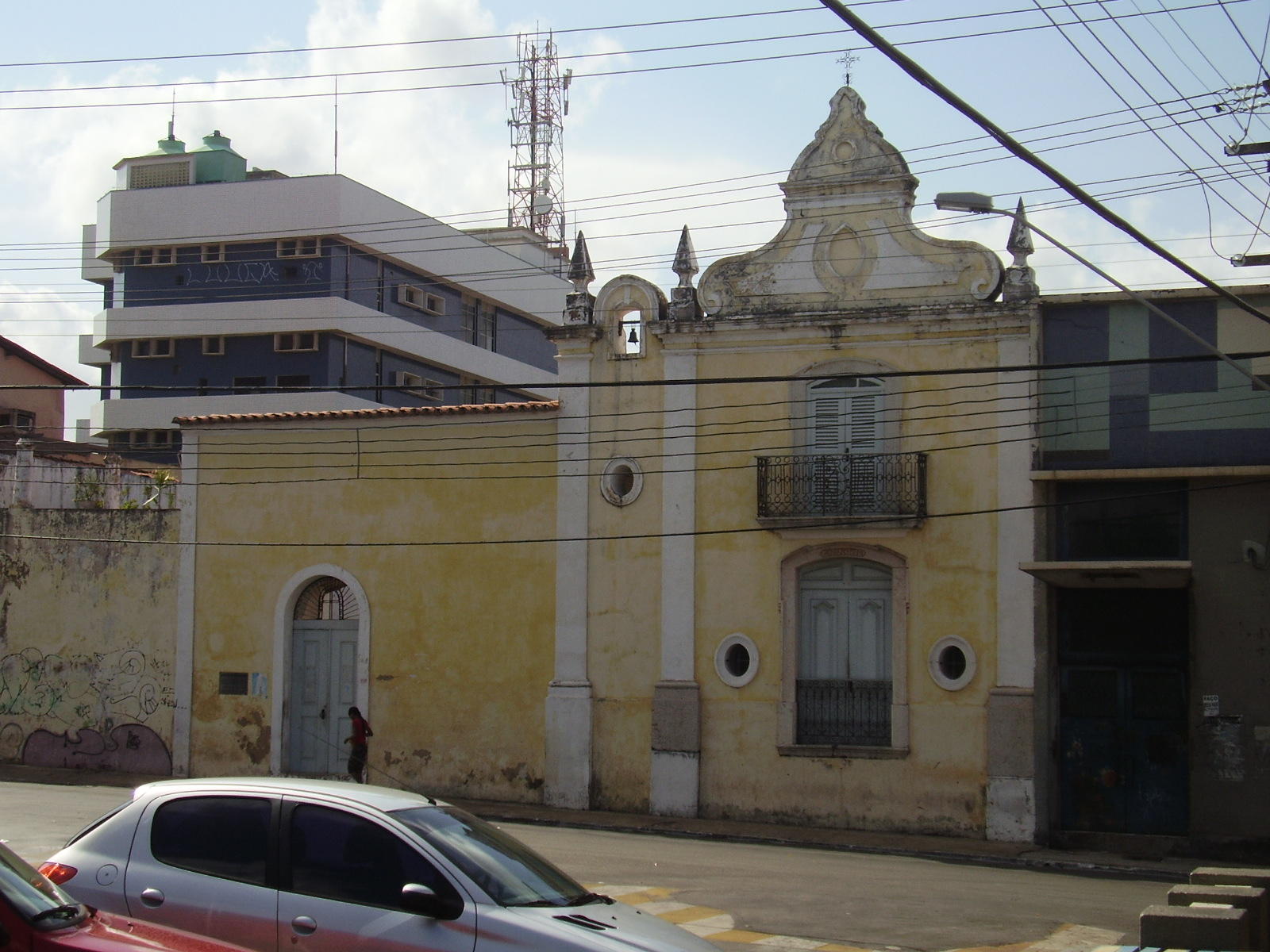

- Chapel of Laranjeiras in Brazil
- 2.53095°S 44.294504°W
- Location: São Luís, Maranhão
- Address: Rua da Feira Praia Grande, 954 - Centro, São Luís - MA, 65065-545
- Country: Brazil
- Language: Portuguese
- Denomination: Roman Catholic
- Tradition: Roman Rite

History
- Founded: 1814
- Dedication: Saint Joseph
- Consecrated: 1815

Architecture
- Functional status: Active
- Architectural type: Baroque
- Years built: 1811-1814

Administration
- Archdiocese: Roman Catholic Archdiocese of São Luís do Maranhão

The Chapel of Laranjeiras (Portuguese: Capela das Laranjeiras), known fully as the Chapel of São José da Quinta das Laranjeiras, and more commonly the Chapel of Saint Joseph, is located in the Historic Center of São Luís, Maranhão, Brazil. It was completed in 1815 as part of a large farm belonging to Luiz José Gonçalves da Silva, a merchant and mayor of São Luís. The farm was absorbed and lost into the urban fabric of São Luís in the 19th and 20th century, but the chapel and the ornate gate of the farm remain on Rua Oswaldo Cruz, also known as Rua Grande.

The Chapel of Laranjeiras was designed in the Portuguese colonial style at the end of Portuguese rule in Brazil. Its façade is simple, in the late Brazilian baroque style, with a single portal framed in lioz stone, a pediment with volutes, and single bell tower. The interior preserves its original characteristics, with a single nave, chancel arch, and chancel. A festival dedicated to Saint Joseph of Laranjeiras is held annually, with a procession through the Historic Center.

The Chapel of Laranjeiras and Gate of the Laranjeiras Farm were listed as a historic structures by the National Institute of Historic and Artistic Heritage in 1940. They are also integral properties of the UNESCO World Heritage Site of Historic Centre of São Luís.

== Location ==
The Chapel of Laranjeiras sits in the western part of the Historic Center of São Luís. It is located on Rua Oswaldo Cruz (Rua Grande), and forms part of an uninterrupted row of buildings along the street. The chapel opens to Rua Urbano Santos, but lacks a church yard. It is located in close proximity to numerous historic structure of the Historic Center; the Liceu Maranhense is located only a block in front of the chapel.

== History ==
The Chapel of Laranjeiras is dedicated to Saint Joseph of Laranjeiras. Bishop Dom Luís de Brito Homem approved construction of the oratory in 1811. It was completed in 1815, and the first mass was only performed in 1816 after five years of construction. It was opened later in the 19th century to the entire community for religious services.

São Luís was the site of numerous wealthy and stately farms in the 19th century, with the Laranjeiras Farm standing out amongst them. The farm was built in 1812 by the mayor and greatest merchant of Maranhão during the colonial period, Luiz José Gonçalves da Silva, nicknamed "The Barateiro". The complex consisted of a colonial-style plantation house, slave quarters (senzala), workers' quarters, and a chapel. The upper floors of the plantation house and chapel was reserved for use only by the family, in line with the strict social and racial stratification of colonial and 19th century Brazil. The mayor's eldest daughter, Maria Luíza do Espírito Santo, inherited several properties including the Laranjeiras Farm. The place was also known as Capela do Barateiro and, later, as Quinta do Barão, due to the marriage of Maria Luiza with Brigadier Paulo José da Silva, who would later receive the title Baron of Bagé. With a rich cultural heritage, the chapel preserves signs of the economic opulence of 19th-century Maranhão.

The Quinta farm has passed through several owners in the late 19th and early 20th century, and absorbed into the urban fabric of São Luís in the same period. It was acquired by the Archdiocese of Maranhão in 1939, which sold it to the Marist Brothers for the construction of a school. The chapel and imposing gate are the only remnants of the farm; they are located approximately a block apart, both on Rua Oswaldo Cruz (Rua Grande). Both are listed by IPHAN and remain under the care of the State Secretariat of Culture of Maranhão. The chapel was restored in 2004.

== Structure ==
The Chapel of Laranjeiras was designed in the somber Portuguese colonial style at the end of Portuguese rule in Brazil. It retains elements of a simple baroque, rococo, and neoclassical styles. The chapel sits on a rectangular floor plan with a single nave, wooden chancel arch, and chancel. The walls are of masonry building of stone and lime.

=== Exterior ===
The façade is simple and built in the transition period from the late baroque to the Brazilian neoclassical style. It is divided horizontally into three section: the lowest has a single portal with a full arch and an iron flag; the second a recessed window with a recessed balcony and iron balconette at the choir level; and third a baroque-style pediment.

The façade is divided vertically by three pilasters ending in large, masonry spires: two frame the central body of the chapel below the entablature and pediment, and a simple bell tower to the left. Two oculi frame the portal, and one on the bell tower corresponds to the window at the second level. The oculi are framed in ashlar stone.

The pediment consists of volutes, is flanked by the masonry spire that surmount the pilaster, and is topped by an iron crucifix. A cornice surrounds the middle section of the pediment, and there are bas-relief circular and oval details in both sections.

=== Interior ===
The interior has a harmonious ensemble of a nave with a small number of pews, altar rail, chancel arch, and valance. It has features of both the rococo and early Brazilian neoclassical movement. The initials "S.J.", representing Saint Joseph are engraved in the central part of the archivolt of the chancel arch. The altar and retable are in the neoclassical style. The church floor is covered in fine ashlar stone. A small choir is of wood, with "openwork cutouts with stylized vine leaves." The tomb of José Gonçalves da Silva, founder of the farm estate, sits at the left side of the nave.

The chapel, while small, holds numerous pieces of religious art. The most important is an image of Saint Joseph, produced in the 17th century in Portugal. It is noted for its fine carving, and has glass eyes. The altarpiece also has an oil painting of Our Lady of Penha (Nossa Senhora da Penha).

== Festival of Saint Joseph ==
The Brotherhood of São José das Laranjeiras holds a celebration in honor of the patron saint of market traders annually with a public procession through the city center.

== Protected status ==
The Chapel of Laranjeiras and the nearby Gate of the Laranjeiras Farm were among the earliest federally listed building in São Luís. The chapel was listed by IPHAN (then SPHAN) in 1940 under inscription number 281. The chapel and gate are also integral properties of the Historic Center of São Luís, listed by the State of Maranhão (1974) and as a UNESCO World Heritage Site (1997).

== Access ==
The Chapel of Laranjeiras is open to the public and may be visited.
