= Diocese of Caxias do Maranhão =

Catholic ecclesiastical territory

Coordinates: 4.8651°S 43.3587°W

Diocese of Caxias do Maranhão Dioecesis Caxiensis in Maragnano

Catholic

Location
- Country: Brazil
- Ecclesiastical province: São Luís do Maranhão

Statistics
- Area: 34,449 km^{2} (13,301 sq mi)
- Population: Total; Catholics: (as of 2004); 720,000; 690,000 (95.8%)

Information
- Rite: Latin Rite
- Established: 22 July 1939 (87 years ago)
- Cathedral: Catedral de Nossa Senhora dos Remérios

Current leadership
- Pope: Leo XIV
- Bishop: Sebastião Lima Duarte
- Metropolitan Archbishop: Gilberto Pastana de Oliveira

The Roman Catholic Diocese of Caxias do Maranhão (Latin: Dioecesis Caxiensis in Maragnano) is a suffragan Latin diocese in the ecclesiastical province of the Metropolitan of São Luís do Maranhão in northeastern Brazil.

Its cathedral episcopal see is Catedral de Nossa Senhora dos Remédios, dedicated to the Virgin of Los Remedios, in the city of Caxias (do Maranhão), in Maranhão state.

== History ==
- Established on 22 July 1939 as Diocese of Caxias do Maranhão, on territory split off from its Metropolitan, the Archdiocese of São Luís do Maranhão
- It lost territory repeatedly : on 1954.12.20 to establish the then Territorial Prelature of Santo Antônio de Balsas and in 1967 to enlarge the same Territorial Prelature (now Diocese of Balsas, in the same province).

== Statistics ==
As per 2015, it pastorally served 825,000 Catholics (96.9% of 851,000 total) on 34,449 km² in 23 parishes and 135 missions with 25 priests (23 diocesan, 2 religious), 14 deacons, 48 lay religious (6 brothers, 42 sisters) and 15 seminarians.

== Episcopal ordinaries ==
(all Roman rite)

Suffragan Bishops of Caxias do Maranhão

- Luís Gonzaga da Cunha Marelim, Congregation of the Mission (C.M., Lazarists) (19 July 1941 - retired 18 February 1981), died 1991; no previous prelature
  - Auxiliary Bishop: Cândido Julio Bampi, Capuchin Franciscans (O.F.M. Cap.) (1957.01.18 – death 1978.07.07); (also previously) Titular Bishop of Tlos (1936.06.27 – 1978.07.07), initially as only Bishop-Prelate of then Territorial Prelature of Vacaria (now a diocese, Brazil) (1936.06.27 – 1957.01.18)
- Jorge Tobias de Freitas (15 March 1981 - 7 November 1986), next Bishop of Nazaré (Brazil) (1986.11.07 – retired 2006.07.26)
- Luís d’Andrea, O.F.M. Conv. (born Italy) (29 October 1987 - retired 19 March 2010), died 2012
- Vilson Basso, Priests of the Sacred Heart (S.C.I.) (19 March 2010 – 2017.04.19), next Bishop of Imperatriz (Brazil) (2017.04.19 – ...).
- Sebastião Lima Duarte (2017.12.20 – ...), previously Bishop of Viana (Brazil) (2010.07.07 – 2017.12.20).

== See also ==
- List of Catholic dioceses in Brazil

== Sources and external links ==
- GCatholic.org, with Google map - data for all sections
- Catholic Hierarchy
