= Historic Centre of São Luís =

UNESCO World Heritage Site
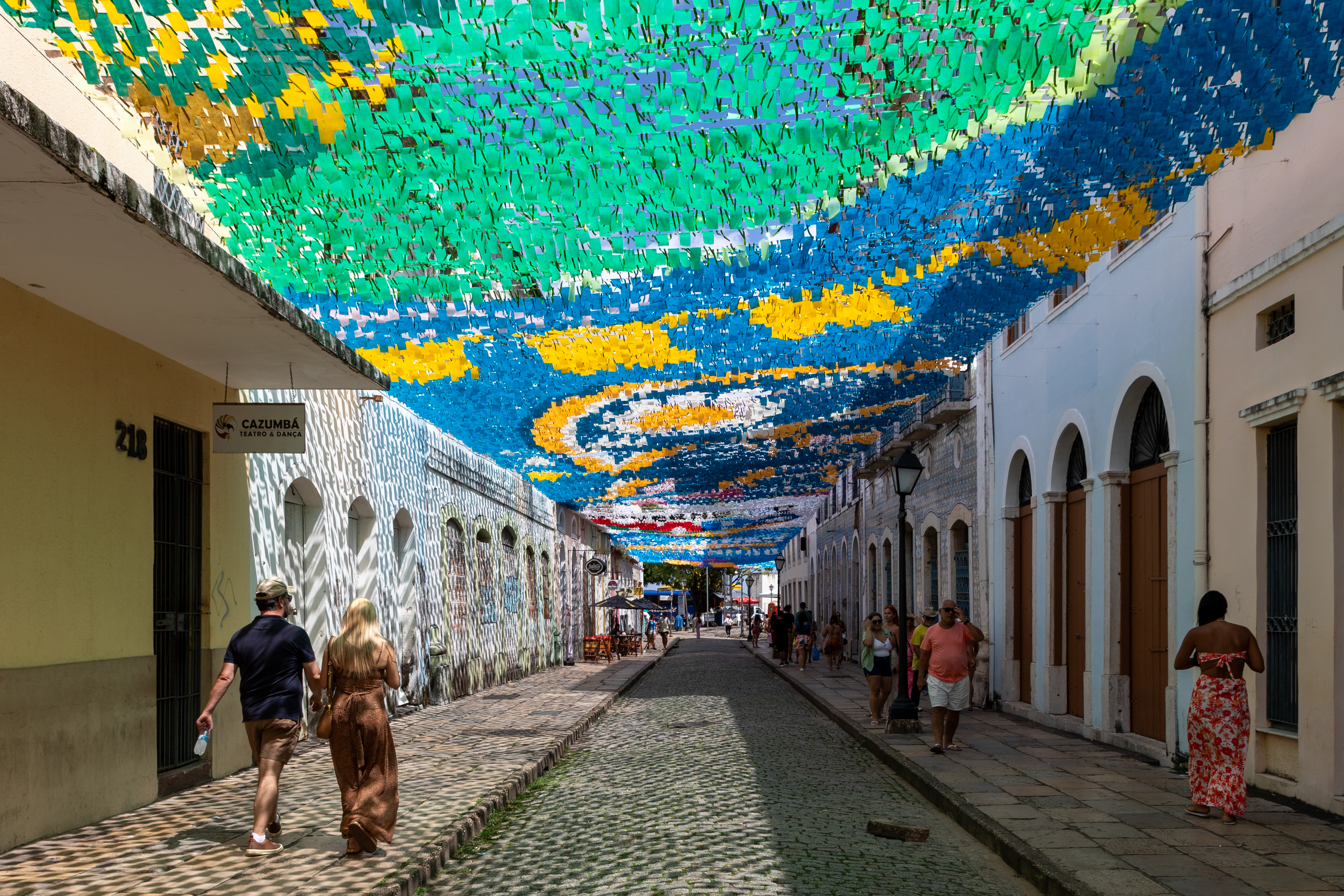
- Rua Portugal, São Luís

- Location within Brazil
- Location: São Luís, Maranhão, Brazil
- Reference: 821
- Inscription: 1997 (21st Session)
- Coordinates: 2°31′S 44°18′W

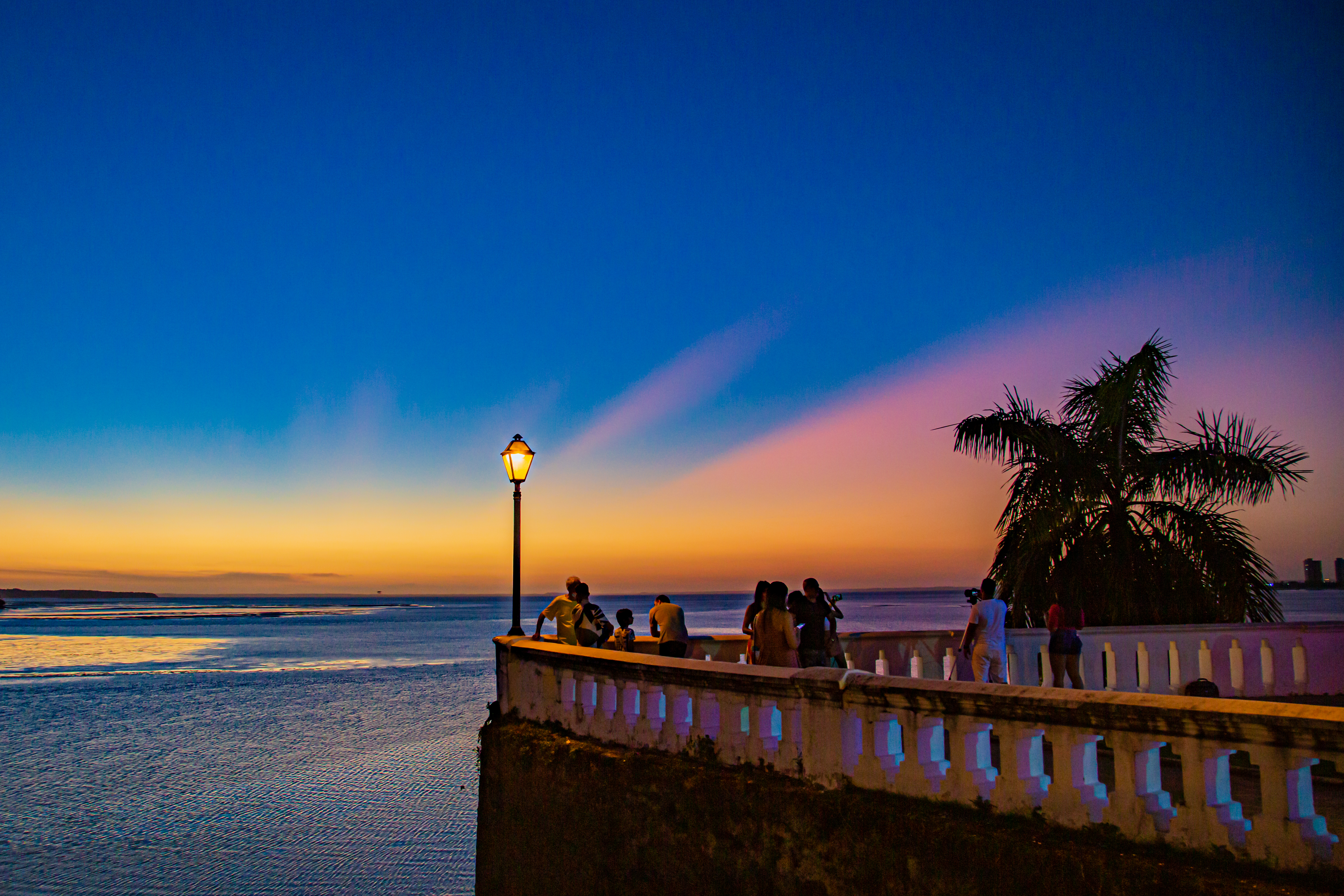
Sunset at the Square of the Palácio dos Leões

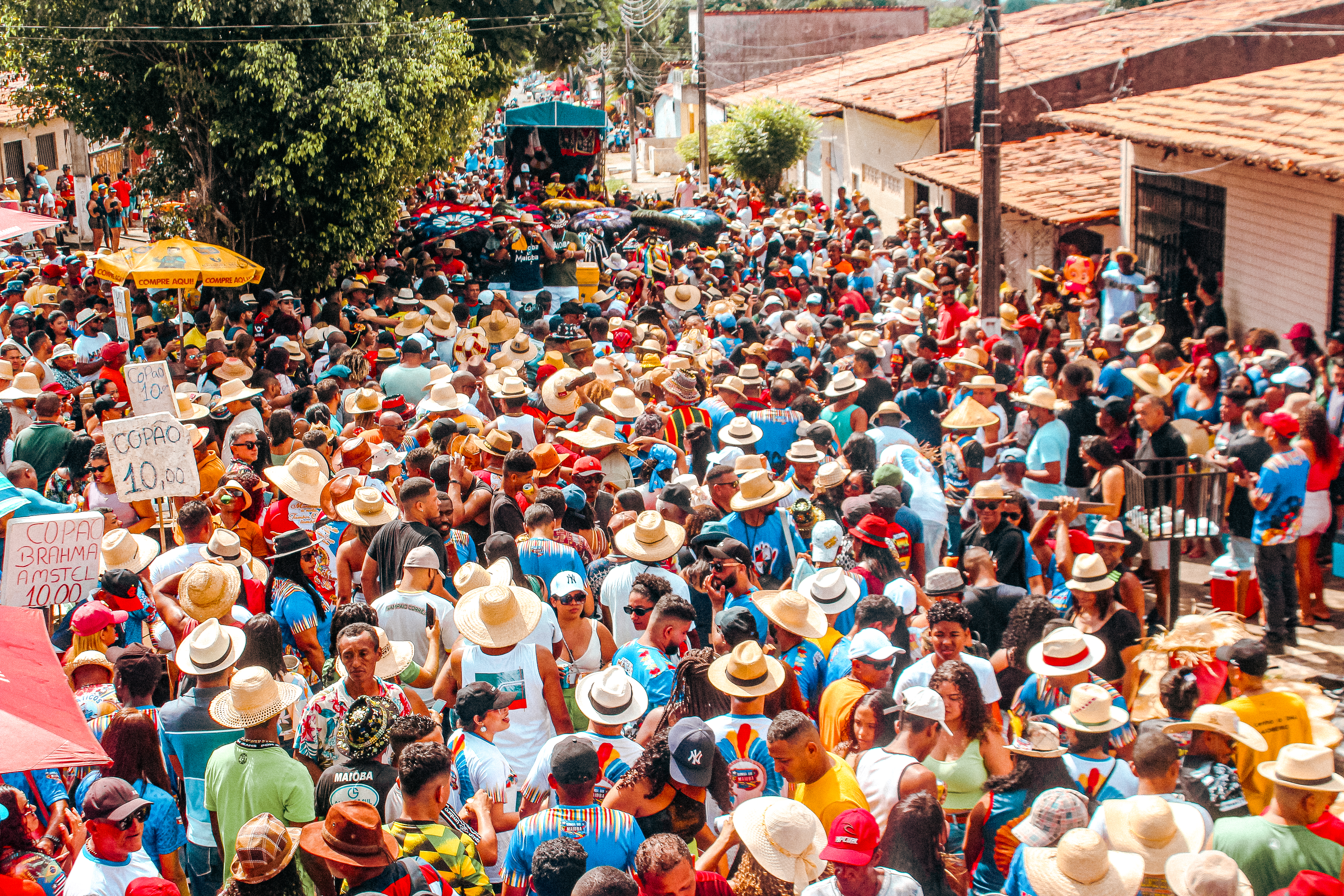
Boi da Maioba, a bumba meu boi folk dance group

The Historic Centre of São Luís (Portuguese: Centro Histórico de São Luís) is located on the Island of São Luis on the Bay of São Marcos in São Luís, the capital of Maranhão, Brazil. The historic center covers an area of 220 hectares (540 acres), and has approximately 4,000 properties from the 18th and 19th centuries within protected state and federal zones. Part, but not all, of the Historic Center was declared a World Heritage Site in 1997. The Brazilian National Institute of Historic and Artistic Heritage (IPHAN) describes the Historic Center as "an exceptional example of a Portuguese colonial city adapted to the climatic conditions of equatorial South America, and which has preserved its urban fabric harmoniously integrated into its surrounding environment." Pedro Teotónio Pereira, ambassador to Brazil and first director of the Gulbenkian Foundation, described São Luís as "the most Portuguese city in Brazil".

== History ==
The region of São Luís was settled by Tupinambá people prior to the arrival of European explorers. The European powers were attracted to São Luís due to its protected bay, favorable climate, access to fresh water, and abundant resources. The earliest history of the Portuguese in São Luís is unclear, but began as a small Portuguese-Spanish settlement in 1531. It was abandoned and passed to French rule in 1612 as part of the short-lived plan for Equatorial France, a French colony in South America. No buildings from the French settlement remain. The Portuguese regained control of the city three years later.

The Portuguese engineer Francisco Frias de Mesquita created a city plan based on the grid system in 1615 roughly based on the existing French settlement, taking full advantage of the security of the port and access to fresh water and natural resources. De Mesquita's plan was followed by a strict buildings codes of Portuguese authorities, uncommon to Brazil in the colonial period.

The Portuguese lost control of São Luís in 1641 as part of the Dutch invasion of Brazil under the leadership of John Maurice of Nassau. The Portuguese regained São Luís in 1644, but the city remained undeveloped and sparsely populated. Construction accelerated during the period of urban expansion in the 18th and 19th centuries due to the establishment of the Company of Grão-Para and the cotton boom of the 19th century. The urban expansion of later periods, however, still followed the 1615 layout by Francisco Frias de Mesquita.

== Architecture ==
The Historic Center is characterized by a large, uninterrupted ensemble of civic, residential, and religious structures. Most are sobrados, Portuguese-style townhouses, flush with street. They range from small, single story houses, two-story houses, to large, multi-story mansions. The ground floor of multi-story residences was reserved for commercial and public use, and the upper floors reserved for the privacy of the family. The sobrados have many refined details. One-story houses are classified as a simple structure with a door and one or two windows, or a "half house", with a side door and two windows. The architectural characteristic of the Historic Center were shaped by the climate, which is hot and humid. Two solutions emerged: one was the use of azulejos, where waterproofed the adobe facades. The other was the construction of town houses in an "L" or "U" shape, with large roofs and shutters.

Unlike other historic centers in Brazil, the urban layout is not dominated by church façades and squares; many large parish churches, such as the Pantaleao, are place flush at street level, in line with residences and other structures. Some sobrados were not limited to residential use; many were used as storefronts, workshops, and small warehouses. The Casa de Nagô is a notable example of a sobrado used as a slave auction house, placed prominently on Rua de Criolas, facing both the Mercedarian monastery and located close to the port area.

=== Churches ===
The Jesuits, Carmelites, and Franciscans entered São Luís through the first Portuguese and French colonies in the Brazil and again after the Dutch occupation of the city. The brotherhoods built churches and convents similar to those of others in Brazil; parish churches followed. Catholic orders continued to enter São Luís after the Independence of Brazil in 1822, occupying spaces abandoned by earlier orders or constructing new churches and schools.

Church architecture in São Luís followed that of other colonial cities in Brazil in history and form. The urban density of São Luís, however, resulted in monumental churches placed within the fabric of long, narrow streets. Numerous churches from the colonial period survive, most in a late baroque style. Some have only a modest or no church yard due to space constraints in the historic center. The Carmelites and Mercedarians built large-scale convents, but most fell into ruin, were converted to schools, or now exist as cultural centers.

=== Azulejos ===
The Historic Center is noted for, above all, the widespread use of azulejos tiles, the largest collection in Brazil. Azulejos provided both insulation and protection in the harsh, Equatorial climate of São Luís. Azulejos are found on and within buildings of all type, from single-door residences to the grand interiors of churches.

== World Heritage Site ==
The historic center of the capital of the state of Maranhão is the ninth historical-cultural monument in the country included in the UNESCO World Cultural and Natural Heritage List, as decided by the General Assembly of the World Heritage Committee of this institution, meeting in Naples, Italy, on December 4, 1997.

According to UNESCO, among the technical aspects that made São Luís a World Heritage Site, the exceptional testimony of cultural tradition stands out. This refers to the great preservation of the colonial houses in the historic center of São Luís, a preserved portrait of the Portuguese presence in the 18th and early 19th centuries.

== Historic properties ==
The Historic Center of São Luís, unlike other historic centers in Brazil, consists of a large number of residential structures, rather than named historic buildings. Named buildings, some, but not all, with federal and state protection, include:

=== Government structures ===
- Leões Palace (Palácio dos Leões), now the government headquarters of the State of Maranhão
- La Ravardière Palace, the (Palácio de La Ravardière), now the municipal headquarters of São Luís

=== Civil and private infrastructure ===
- Ribeirão Fountain (Fonte do Ribeirão)
- Pedras Fountain (Fonte das Pedras)

=== Residential structures ===
- Vasconcelos Manor House (Solar dos Vasconcelos)
- House of the Baroness of Anajatuba (Casa da Baronesa de Anajatuba)
- House of the Barons of Grajaú (Sobradão dos Barões de Grajaú)
- Pacotilha Manor House (Sobrado do Pacotilha)

=== Cultural structures ===
- Cafua das Mercês (English: Cavern of Mercy), a prison for enslaved people prior to auction
- Casa das Minas, a 19th century Afro-Brazilian temple
- Casa de Nagô
- Casa das Tulhas
- Artur Azevedo Theater (Teatro Artur Azevedo)

=== Religious structures ===
- Catedral de São Luís (Catedral de São Luís), formally the Cathedral of Our Lady of Victory
- Episcopal Palace (Palácio Episcopal), the former Jesuit College
- Church and Convent of Mount Carmel (Igreja e Convento do Carmo)
- Church of Our Lady of the Conception (Igreja da Conceição)
- Convent of Mercy (Convento das Mercês)
- Church of Our Lady of the Rosary (Igreja do Rosário)
- Church of Saint Joseph of the Exile (Igreja de São José do Desterro)
- Chapel of the Retreat of Saint Teresa (Capela do Recolhimento de Santa Teresa)
- Church of Pantaleão (Igreja de Pantaleão)
- Chapel of Laranjeiras (Capela das Laranjeiras)
- Convent of Saint Antony (Convento de Santo António)

=== Plazas and historic avenues ===
- João Lisboa Square (Praça João Lisboa)
- Gonçalvo Dias Square (Praça Gonçalvo Dias)
