= Adalberto Paulo da Silva =

Brazilian Roman Catholic prelate

- Auxiliary Bishop Emeritus of Fortaleza
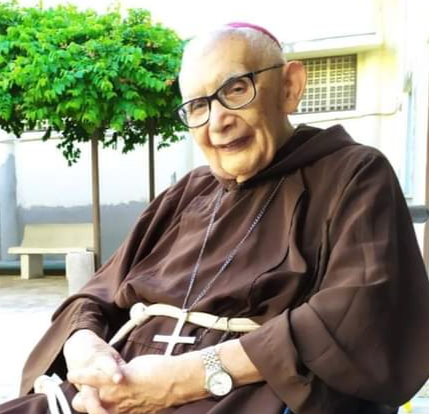
- Paulo da Silva in 2023
- Archdiocese: Fortaleza
- Diocese: Viana
- Appointed: 24 May 1995
- Term ended: 24 March 2004
- Previous post: Bishop of Viana (1975–1995)

Orders
- Ordination: 8 December 1956
- Consecration: 3 August 1975 by Carmine Rocco

Personal details
- Born: 25 January 1929 Sambaíba, Maranhão, Brazil
- Died: 30 July 2025 (aged 96) Fortaleza, Ceará, Brazil

Adalberto Paulo da Silva (25 January 1929 – 30 July 2025) was a Brazilian Roman Catholic prelate. He served as the auxiliary bishop of the Roman Catholic Archdiocese of Fortaleza from 1995 to 2004.

Paulo da Silva died on 30 July 2025, in Fortaleza, Ceará, at the age of 96.
