= Marcelino Correr =

Brazilian clergyman & bishop (1932–2006)

Marcelino Correr (born 11 January 1932 in Piracicaba) was a Brazilian clergyman and bishop for the Roman Catholic Diocese of Carolina. He became ordained in 1957, and was appointed bishop in 1991. He died in 2006.
