= Archdiocese of São Luís do Maranhão =

Catholic ecclesiastical territory

Coordinates: 2.5280°S 44.3047°W

Archdiocese of Sancti Ludovici in Maragnano Archidioecesis Sancti Ludovici in Maragnano

Catholic
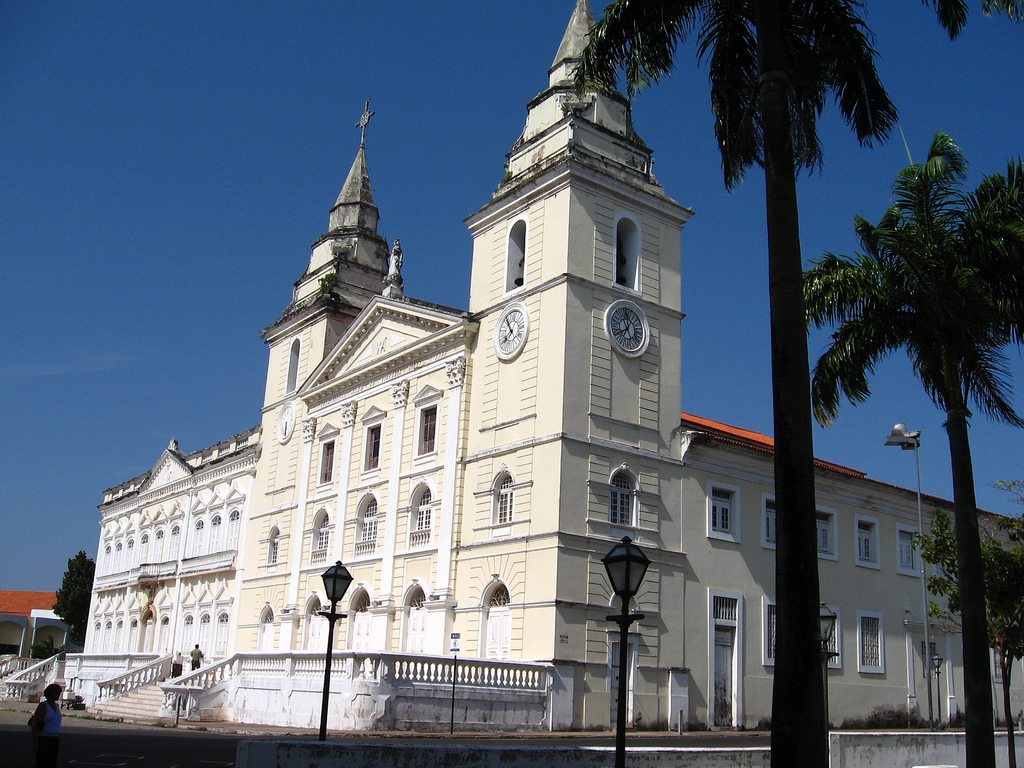
- Cathedral

- Coat of arms

Location
- Country: Brazil
- Ecclesiastical province: São Luís do Maranhão

Statistics
- Area: 11,622 km^{2} (4,487 sq mi)
- Population: Total; Catholics: (as of 2004); 1,195,000; 887,000 (74.2%)

Information
- Rite: Latin Rite
- Established: 30 August 1677 (349 years ago)
- Cathedral: Catedral Metropolitana Nossa Senhora da Vitória

Current leadership
- Pope: Leo XIV
- Archbishop: Gilberto Pastana de Oliveira, OFM

Website
- www.arquidiocesedesaoluis.org

The Roman Catholic Archdiocese of São Luís do Maranhão (Latin: Archidioecesis Sancti Ludovici in Maragnano) is a Latin archdiocese in Brazil.

Its cathedral, located in the city of São Luís do Maranhão, is a World Heritage Site (Minor): Catedral de São Luís do Maranhão.

On 2 December 1921, by a decree of the Sacred Consistorial Congregation, it was elevated to the rank of archdiocese and on 10 February 1922, by the bull Rationi congruit of Pope Pius XI, to the metropolitan see.

== Properties ==
- Cathedral:
  - Metropolitan Cathedral of Our Lady of Victory, or Cathedral of Our Lady of Victory (Catedral Metropolitana Nossa Senhora da Vitória)
- Churches
  - Church of Pantaleão, a property in the Historic Center of São Luís
- Chapels
  - Chapel of Laranjeiras, a property in the Historic Center of São Luís

== History ==
- Established on 30 August 1677 as Diocese of São Luís do Maranhão, on territory split off from the Diocese of Olinda
- Lost territory on 4 March 1720 to establish Diocese of Belém do Pará
- Lost territory on 10 February 1902 to establish Diocese of Piaui
- 2 December 1921: Promoted as Archdiocese of São Luís do Maranhão
- 10 February 1922: Promoted as Metropolitan Archdiocese of São Luís do Maranhão, having lost territory to establish the then Territorial Prelature of São José do Grajaú (now suffragan diocese of Grajau)
- Lost territory on 1939.07.22 to establish suffragan Diocese of Caxias do Maranhão and Territorial Prelature of Pinheiro (now a suffragan diocese)
- Lost territory on 1962.10.30 to establish suffragan Diocese of Viana
- Lost territory on 1968.06.22 to establish suffragan Diocese of Bacabal
- Lost territory on 1971.09.14 to establish suffragan Diocese of Brejo
- Lost territory on 1977.08.26 to establish suffragan Diocese of Coroatá
- It enjoyed a papal visit from Pope John Paul II in October 1991.

== Bishops ==
(all Roman Rite)

=== Episcopal ordinaries ===
Suffragan bishops of São Luís do Maranhão

- Fr. Antônio de Santa Maria (1677 – death 1677 not possessed)
- Gregório dos Anjos, ? CSJ (1677.08.30 – death 1689.05.11), previously bishop of Malacca (Malaysia) (? – 1677.08.30 not possessed)
- Francisco de Lima, OCarm (1691.12.19 – 1695.08.22), later bishop of Olinda (Brazil) (1695.08.22 – death 1704.04.29)
- Timóteo do Sacramento, OSB (1696.12.17 – retired 1700), previously bishop of Tomé (São Tomé and Príncipe) (1693.01.02 – 1696.12.17)
- José Delgarte, OSST (1716.10.05 – death 1724.12.23)
- Manoel da Cruz Nogueira, OCist (1738.09.03 – 1745.12.15), later bishop of Mariana (Brazil) (1745.12.15 – 1764.01.03)
- Francisco de São Tiago, OFM (1745.12.15 – death 1752.12.12)
- Antônio de São José, OSA (1756.07.19 – 1778.07.20) later metropolitan archbishop of São Salvador da Bahia (Brazil) (1778.07.20 – death 1779.08.09)
- Jacinto Carlos da Silveira (1779.03.01 – retired 1780.04.29)
- José do Menino Jesus, OCD (1780.09.18 – 1783.07.18), later bishop of Viseu (Portugal) (1783.07.18 – death 1791.01.14)
- Antônio de Pádua e Belas, OFM (1783.07.18 – retired 1794.08.28)
- Joaquim Ferreira de Carvalho (1795.06.01 – death 1801.04.26)
- Luiz de Brito Homem (1802.05.24 – death 1813.12.10), previously bishop of São Paulo de Loanda (Angola) (1791.12.17 – 1802.05.24)
- Joaquim de Nossa Senhora de Nazareth Oliveira e Abreu, OFM (1819.08.23 – 1824.05.03), previously Bishop-Prelate of Territorial Prelature of Mozambique (Mozambique) (1811.12.17 – 1819.08.23) and Titular Bishop of Leontopolis in Bithynia (1815.09.04 – 1819.08.23); later bishop of Coimbra (Portugal) (1824.05.03 – death 1851.08.31)
- Marcos Antônio de Souza (1827.06.25 – death 1842.11.29)
- Carlos de São José e Souza, OCD (1844.01.22 – death 1850.04.03)
- Manoel Joaquim da Silveira (1851.09.05 – 1861.01.05), later metropolitan archbishop of São Salvador da Bahia (Brazil) (1861.01.05 – death 1874.06.23)
- Luiz da Conceição Saraiva, OSB (1861.07.22 – death 1876.04.26)
- Antônio Cândido Alvarenga (1877.09.21 – 1898.11.28), later bishop of São Paulo (Brazil) (1898.11.28 – 1903.04.01)
- Apostolic Administrator Fr. Luis de Salles Pessoa (1898 – death 1898)
- Antônio Xisto Albano (1901.03.23 – 1905.12.14), emeritate as titular bishop of Bethsaida (1905.12.14 – death 1917.02.21)
- Bishop-elect Santino Maria da Silva Coutinho (1906.09.09 – 1906.12.06), later metropolitan archbishop of Belém do Pará (Brazil) (1906.12.06 – 1923.01.19), metropolitan archbishop of Maceió (Brazil) (1923.01.19 – 1939.01.10)
- Francisco de Paula Silva, CM (1907.04.18 – death 1918.06.04)
- Helvécio Gomes de Oliveira, SDB (1918.06.18 – 1921.12.02 see below), previously bishop of Corumbá (Brazil) (1918.02.15 – 1918.06.18)

Archbishop of São Luís do Maranhão

- Helvécio Gomes de Oliveira, SDB (see above 1921.12.02 – 1922.02.10)

Metropolitan archbishops of São Luís do Maranhão

- Octaviano Pereira de Albuquerque (1922.10.27 – 1935.12.16), previously bishop of Piaui (Brazil) (1914.04.02 – 1922.10.27); later archbishop-bishop of Campos (Brazil) (1935.12.16 – death 1949.01.03)
- Carlos Carmelo de Vasconcelos Motta (1935.12.19 – 1944.08.13), previously titular bishop of Algiza (1932.07.29 – 1935.12.19) and auxiliary bishop of Diamantina (Brazil) (1932.07.29 – 1935.12.19); later metropolitan archbishop of São Paulo (Brazil) (1944.08.13 – 1964.04.18), created Cardinal-Priest of S. Pancrazio (1946.02.22 – 1982.09.18), also president of National Conference of Bishops of Brazil (1952 – 1958), apostolic administrator of Aparecida (Brazil) (1958.04.19 – 1964.04.18), succeeded as metropolitan archbishop of Aparecida (1964.04.18 – death 1982.09.18), also Apostolic Administrator of Lorena (Brazil) (1970 – 1971.11.03), Protopriest of Sacred College of Cardinals (1977.08.02 – 1982.09.18)
- Adalberto Accioli Sobral (1947.01.18 – death 1951.05.24), previously bishop of Barra (Brazil) (1927.04.22 – 1934.01.13), bishop of Pesqueira (Brazil) (1934.01.13 – 1947.01.18)
- José de Medeiros Delgado (1951.09.04 – 1963.05.10), previously bishop of Caicó (Brazil) (1941.03.15 – 1951.09.04); later metropolitan archbishop of Fortaleza (Brazil) (1963.05.10 – retired 1973.03.26)
- João José da Mota e Albuquerque (1964.04.28 – retired 1984.03.20), previously bishop of Afogados da Ingazeira (Brazil) (1957.01.04 – 1961.02.28), bishop of Sobral (Brazil) (1961.02.28 – 1964.04.28)
- Paulo Eduardo Andrade Ponte (1984.03.20 – retired 2005.09.21), also vice-president of National Conference of Bishops of Brazil (1987 – 1991); previously bishop of Itapipoca (Brazil) (1971.06.25 – 1984.03.20)
- José Belisário da Silva, OFM (2005.09.21 – 2021.06.02), also vice-president of National Conference of Bishops of Brazil (2011.05.10 – 2015.04.20), second vice-president of Latin American Episcopal Council (2015.05.13 – ...); previously bishop of Bacabal (Brazil) (1999.12.01 – 2005.09.21)
- Gilberto Pastana de Oliveira (2021 – present)

=== Auxiliary bishops ===
- Otàvio Barbosa Aguiar (1954–1956), appointed bishop of Campina Grande, Paraiba
- Antônio Batista Fragoso (1957–1964), appointed bishop of Crateús, Ceara
- Manuel Edmilson da Cruz (1966–1974), appointed auxiliary bishop of Fortaleza, Ceara
- Xavier Gilles de Maupeou d’Ableiges (1995–1998), appointed bishop of Viana, Maranhão
- Geraldo Dantas de Andrade, SCI (1998–2010)
- José Carlos Chacorowski, CM (2010–2013), appointed bishop of Caraguatatuba, Sao Paulo
- Esmeraldo Barreto de Farias, Ist. del Prado (2015–2020), appointed bishop of Araçuaí, Minas Gerais

=== Another priest of this diocese who became bishop ===
- Benedito Araújo, appointed coadjutor bishop of Guajará-Mirim, Rondonia in 2011

== Province ==
Its ecclesiastical province comprises the Metropolitan's own archdiocese and the following suffragan dioceses:

- Roman Catholic Diocese of Bacabal
- Roman Catholic Diocese of Balsas
- Roman Catholic Diocese of Brejo
- Roman Catholic Diocese of Carolina
- Roman Catholic Diocese of Caxias do Maranhão
- Roman Catholic Diocese of Coroatá
- Roman Catholic Diocese of Grajaú
- Roman Catholic Diocese of Imperatriz
- Roman Catholic Diocese of Pinheiro
- Roman Catholic Diocese of Viana
- Roman Catholic Diocese of Zé Doca
