= Teatro Arthur Azevedo =

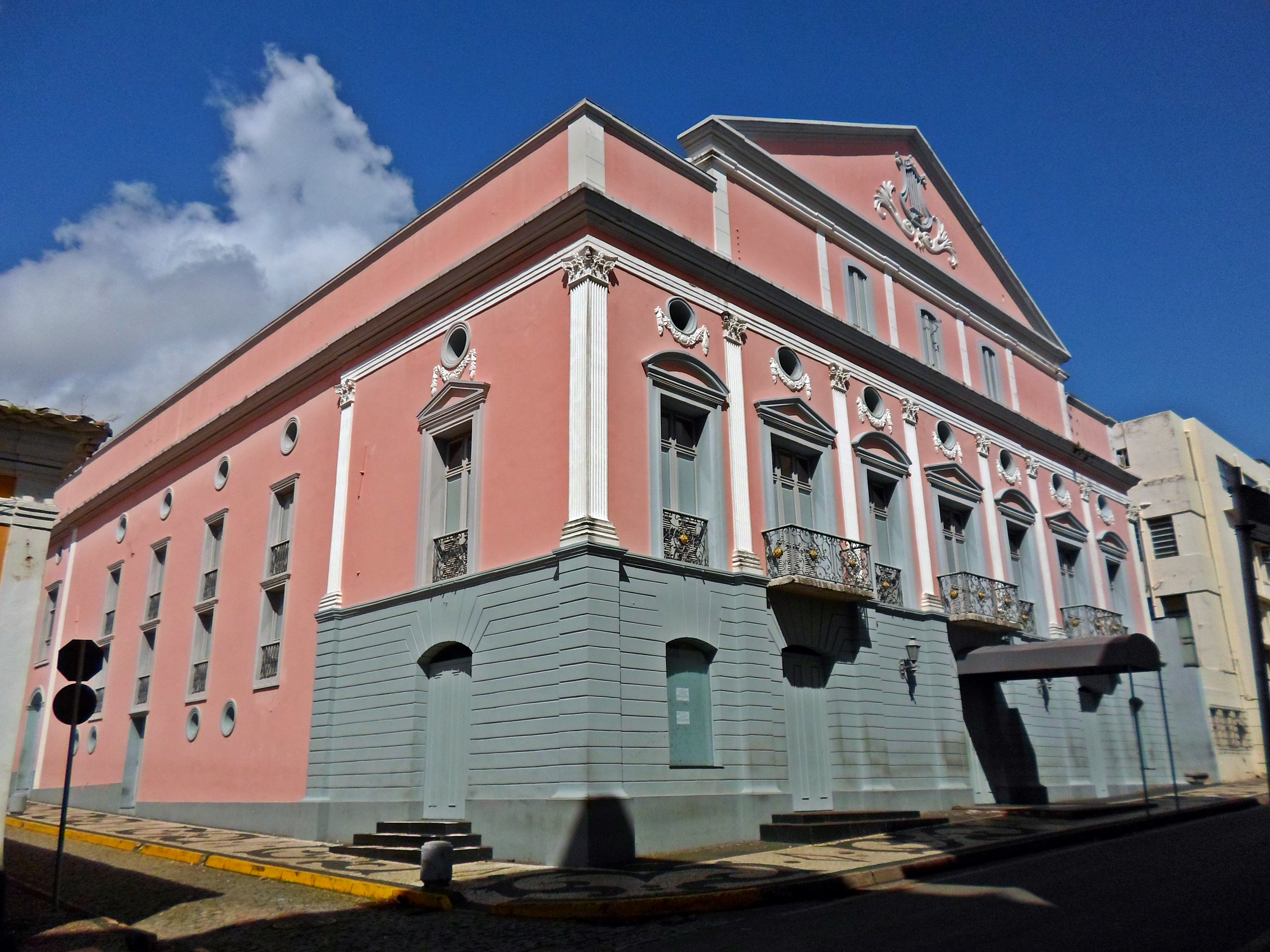
- Interactive map of the Teatro Arthur Azevedo area

General information
- Architectural style: Neoclassic
- Location: São Luís, Maranhão, Brazil
- Coordinates: 2.5290°S 44.3025°W
- Inaugurated: 1 June 1817

Other information
- Seating capacity: 750

The Teatro Arthur Azevedo is a theatre in São Luís, the capital of Maranhão, Brazil. The building in neoclassical style is located in the Historic Centre of São Luís. Built in 1817, it is the second oldest theatre of Brazil and was named after Artur Azevedo in 1922. The present structure was rebuilt, following the original plans, in 1989.

== History ==
The theatre was the second theatre in Brazil, completed in 1817. Two Portuguese merchants, Eleutério Lopes da Silva Varela and Estevão Gonçalves Braga, had the idea of building a theatre of proportions they had seen in Lisbon in 1815, during the Maranhão cotton boom. It was built after the model of Italian theatres in horseshoe-shape with balconies, in neoclassical style. It was named Teatro da União, opened on 1 June 1817. It seated 800 spectators, or 5% of the citizens at the time. In 1852 it was named Teatro São Luiz, and in 1922 renamed again, after the poet and playwright Artur Azevedo in 1922.

From 1940 and 1966 it served as a cinema. It was then abandoned and ended in ruins, with only the facade remaining. In 1989 it was demolished and rebuilt following the original plan. It seats 750 spectators on four levels. The theatre features a y a professional video system to record and broadcast shows.
