= Diocese of Carolina =

Catholic ecclesiastical territory

Coordinates: 7.3308°S 47.4750°W

Diocese of Carolina Dioecesis Carolinensis in Brasilia

Catholic
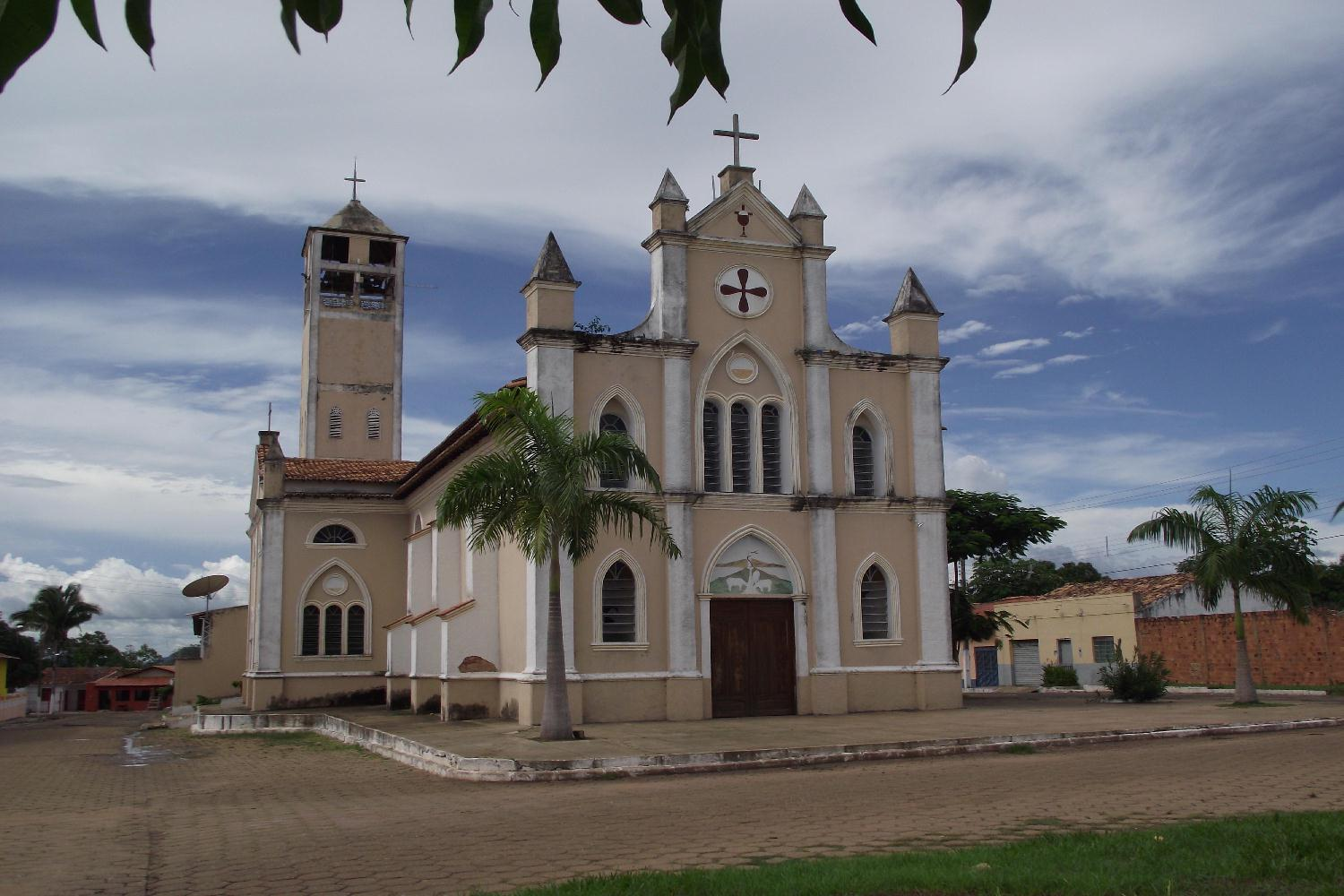
- Catedral São Pedro de Alcântara in 2011

Location
- Country: Brazil
- Ecclesiastical province: São Luís do Maranhão

Statistics
- Area: 18,252 km^{2} (7,047 sq mi)
- Population: Total; Catholics: (as of 2004); 150,000; 121,000 (80.7%)

Information
- Rite: Latin Rite
- Established: 14 January 1958 (68 years ago)
- Cathedral: Catedral São Pedro de Alcântara

Current leadership
- Pope: Leo XIV
- Bishop: Francisco Lima Soares
- Metropolitan Archbishop: Gilberto Pastana de Oliveira
- Bishops emeritus: José Soares Filho, OFMCap

The Roman Catholic Diocese of Carolina (Latin: Dioecesis Carolinensis in Brasilia) is a suffragan diocese in the ecclesiastical province of São Luís do Maranhão in northeastern Brazil's Maranhão state.

Its cathedral episcopal see is Catedral São Pedro de Alcântara, dedicated to Saint Peter of Alcantara, in the city of Carolina, Maranhão.

== History ==
- 14 January 1958: Established as Territorial Prelature of Carolina, on territory split off from the Diocese of Rio Preto
- 16 October 1979: Promoted as Diocese of Carolina
- Lost territory on 1987.06.27 to establish Diocese of Imperatriz

== Statistics ==
As per 2015, it pastorally served 158,100 Catholics (89.9% of 175,800 total) on 18,252 km² in 11 parishes and 1 mission with 12 priests (diocesan), 2 lay religious (2 sisters) and 4 seminarians.

== Bishops ==
(all Roman Rite)

=== Episcopal ordinaries ===
Territorial Bishop-Prelates of Carolina

- Cesário Alexandre Minali, OFMCap (born Italy) (1958.04.09 – death 1969.06.13), Titular Bishop of Achyraus (1955.03.01 – 1969.06.13), previously Bishop-Prelate of Territorial Prelature of Alto Solimões (Brazil) (1955.03.01 – 1958.04.09)
- Marcelino Sérgio Bicego, OFMCap (first native incumbent) (1971.08.06 – 1979.10.16 see below), Titular Bishop of Lydda (1971.08.06 – 1978.05.26)

Suffragan Bishops of Carolina

- Marcelino Sérgio Bicego, OFMCap (see above 1979.10.16 – death 1980.01.22)
- Evangelista Alcimar Caldas Magalhães, OFMCap (1981.09.03 – 1990.09.12), next Prelate (later Bishop) of Alto Solimões (Brazil) (1990.09.12 – retired 2015.05.20)
- Marcelino Correr, OFMCap (1991.03.13 – retired 2003.10.15), died 2006
- José Soares Filho, OFMCap (2003.10.15 – retired 2017.07.05), also Apostolic Administrator of Diocese of Tocantinópolis (Brazil) (2008.01 – 2009.03.04); succeeded as previous Coadjutor Bishop of Carolina (2003.01.15 – 2003.10.15)
- Francisco Lima Soares (2018.11.21 -)

=== Coadjutor bishop ===
- José Soares Filho, OFMCap (2003)

== See also ==
- List of Catholic dioceses in Brazil

== Sources and external links ==
- GCatholic.org - data for all sections
- Catholic Hierarchy
