= Diocese of Balsas =

Catholic ecclesiastical territory

Coordinates: 7.5299°S 46.0373°W

Diocese of Balsas Dioecesis Balsensis

Catholic

Location
- Country: Brazil
- Ecclesiastical province: São Luís do Maranhão

Statistics
- Area: 66,025 km^{2} (25,492 sq mi)
- Population: Total; Catholics: (as of 2006); 237,944; 172,710 (72.6%)

Information
- Rite: Latin Rite
- Established: 20 December 1954 (71 years ago)

Current leadership
- Pope: Leo XIV
- Bishop: Valentim Fagundes de Meneses, M.S.C.
- Metropolitan Archbishop: Gilberto Pastana de Oliveira

The Roman Catholic Diocese of Balsas (Latin: Dioecesis Balsensis) is a diocese located in the city of Balsas in the ecclesiastical province of São Luís do Maranhão in Brazil.

== History ==
- 20 December 1954: Established as Territorial Prelature of Santo Antônio de Balsas from the Diocese of Caxias do Maranhão
- 26 October 1981: Promoted as Diocese of Balsas

== Bishops ==
Prelates of Santo Antônio de Balsas

- Diego Parodi, M.C.C.I. (1959.05.09 – 1966)
- Rino Carlesi, M.C.C.I. (1967.01.12 1981.10.25)

Bishops of Balsas

- Rino Carlesi, M.C.C.I. (1981.10.25 – 1998.04.15)
- Gianfranco Masserdotti, M.C.C.I. (1998.04.15 – 2006.09.17)
  - Coadjutor bishop 1995–1998
- Enemésio Ângelo Lazzaris, F.D.P. (2007.12.12 – 2020.02.02)
- Valentim Fagundes de Meneses, M.S.C. (2020.07.29 – present)

Other priest of this diocese who became bishop

- Sebastião Bandeira Coêlho, appointed Auxiliary Bishop of Manaus, Amazonas in 2004
