= Valter Carrijo =

Brazilian Roman Catholic bishop (born 1934)

The Most Reverend Valter Carrijo S.D.S.
- Bishop Emeritus of Brejo
- Church: Catholic Church
- Diocese: Brejo
- Appointed: 18 January 1989
- Installed: 25 September 1991
- Term ended: 5 May 2010
- Predecessor: Afonso de Oliveira Lima
- Successor: José Valdeci Santos Mendes
- Previous post: Coadjutor Bishop of Brejo (1989–1991)

Orders
- Ordination: 8 December 1961
- Consecration: 15 April 1989 by Paulo Eduardo Andrade Ponte, Mário Teixeira Gurgel, and Roberto Pinarello de Almeida

Personal details
- Born: 22 January 1934 (age 92) Uberlândia, Minas Gerais, Brazil
- Motto: Veni ut vitam habeant
- Coat of arms

Valter Carrijo, S.D.S. (born 22 January 1934) is a Brazilian Roman Catholic prelate who served as the Bishop of Brejo in the Brazilian state of Maranhão from 1991 until his retirement in 2010. He previously served as coadjutor bishop of Brejo since 1989 until 1991. He is bishop emeritus of the diocese.

== Early life and priesthood ==
Carrijo was born on 22 January 1934 in Uberlândia, in the state of Minas Gerais, Brazil. He became a member of the Society of the Divine Saviour, completed his studies in philosophy and theology at the Salvatorian Seminary in Jundiaí and was ordained a priest on 8 December 1961.

Between 1963 and 1988, he was at the various apostolic activities, serving as Formation Master at the Salvatorian Novitiate in Várzea Paulista (São Paulo). He also held the position of Vice-Rector at the Salvatorian Major Seminary in São Paulo and at the Divino Salvador school in Jundiaí (São Paulo).

== Episcopate ==
On 18 January 1989, Carrijo was appointed coadjutor bishop of the Diocese of Brejo. He was consecrated a bishop on 15 April 1989 in Niterói, Rio de Janeiro. His principal consecrators was Paulo Eduardo Andrade Ponte, with Mário Teixeira Gurgel and Roberto Pinarello de Almeida as a co-consecrators.

Carrijo succeeded Afonso de Oliveira Lima as Bishop of Brejo on 25 September 1991. He served as the second bishop of the diocese until 5 May 2010.

=== Retirement ===
On 5 May 2010, Pope Benedict XVI accepted Carrijo's resignation from the pastoral government of the Diocese of Brejo in accordance with canon 401 §1 of the 1983 Code of Canon Law. On the same day, José Valdeci Santos Mendes was appointed his successor.

Following his retirement, Carrijo became bishop emeritus of Brejo.

== Honours ==
In April 2010, the Legislative Assembly of Maranhão awarded Carrijo the title of Cidadão Maranhense (Citizen of Maranhão). The honour recognized his pastoral work in the state and the Diocese of Brejo.

The award was presented during a solemn session of the Legislative Assembly on 8 April 2010. The Assembly's records identify Carrijo as a native of Uberlândia and document the presentation of the honorary title.
