= Diocese of Imperatriz =

Catholic ecclesiastical territory

Coordinates: 5°31′49.3″S 47°27′23.3″W

Diocese of Imperatriz Dioecesis Imperatricis

Catholic
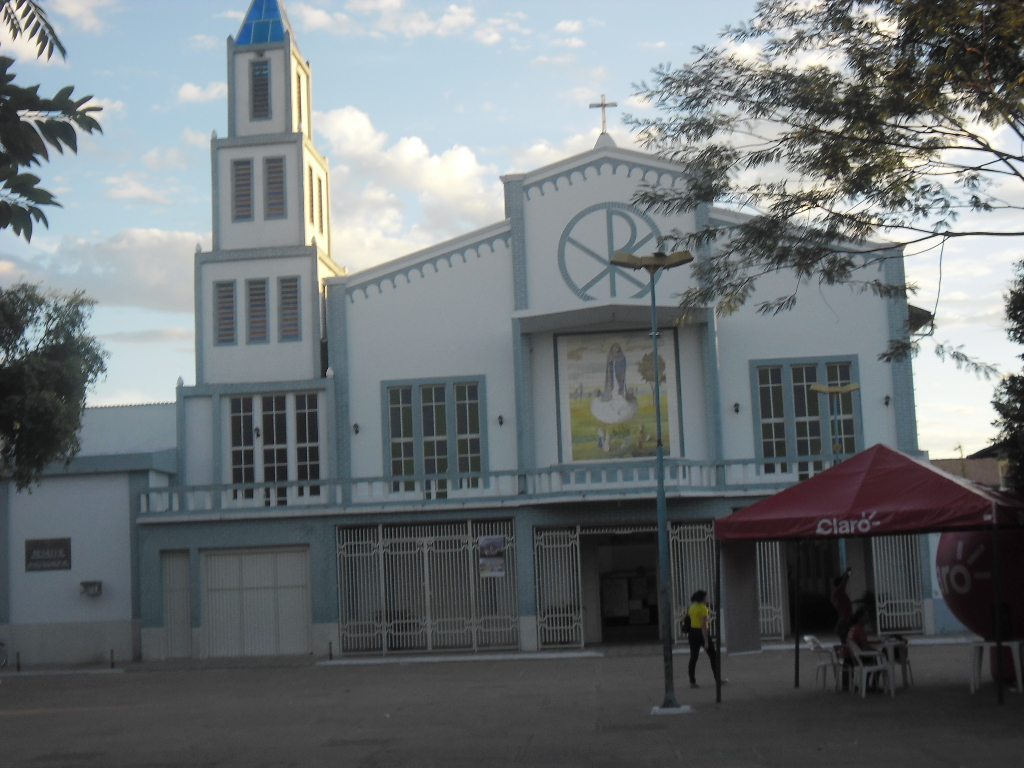
- Catedral Nossa Senhora da Fátima in 2012

Location
- Country: Brazil
- Ecclesiastical province: São Luís do Maranhão

Statistics
- Area: 22,659 km^{2} (8,749 sq mi)
- Population: Total; Catholics: (as of 2004); 470,000; 376,000 (80.0%)

Information
- Rite: Latin Rite
- Established: 27 June 1987 (39 years ago)
- Cathedral: Catedral Nossa Senhora da Fátima

Current leadership
- Pope: Leo XIV
- Bishop: Vilson Basso, S.C.I.
- Metropolitan Archbishop: Gilberto Pastana de Oliveira

The Roman Catholic Diocese of Imperatriz (Latin: Dioecesis Imperatricis) is a suffragan Latin diocese in the ecclesiastical province of the Metropolitan of São Luís do Maranhão in northeastern Brazil.

Its cathedral episcopal see is Catedral Nossa Senhora da Fátima, dedicated to Our Lady of Fatima, in the city of Imperatriz, Maranhão state.

== History ==
- Established on 27 June 1987 as Diocese of Imperatriz, on territory split off from the Diocese of Carolina.

== Statistics ==
As per 2014, it pastorally served 414,000 Catholics (79.9% of 518,000 total) on 25,958 km^{2} in 27 parishes and 2 missions with 43 priests (29 diocesan, 14 religious), 1 deacon, 65 lay religious (19 brothers, 46 sisters) and 7 seminarians .

== Bishops ==
(all Roman rite)

=== Episcopal ordinaries ===
Suffragan Bishops of Imperatriz

- Affonso Felippe Gregory (1987.07.16 – retired 2005.08.03), also President of Caritas Internationalis (1991 – 1999); died 2008; previously Titular Bishop of Drusiliana (1979.08.02 – 1987.07.16) as Auxiliary Bishop of São Sebastião do Rio de Janeiro (Brazil) (1979.08.02 – 1987.07.16)
- Gilberto Pastana de Oliveira (2005.08.03 – 2017.04.19), also Coadjutor Bishop of Crato (Brazil) (2016.05.18 – 2016.12.28), succeeding as Bishop of Crato (2016.12.28 – ...)
- Vilson Basso, Dehonians (S.C.I.) (2017.04.19 – ...), previously Bishop of Caxias do Maranhão (Brazil) (2010.03.19 – 2017.04.19).

=== Other priest of this diocese who became bishops ===
- Francisco Lima Soares, appointed Bishop of Carolina, Maranhão in 2018

== See also ==
- List of Catholic dioceses in Brazil

== Sources and external links ==
- GCatholic.org - data for all sections
- Catholic Hierarchy
