= Enemésio Ângelo Lazzaris =

Brazilian bishop (1948–2020)

Enemésio Ângelo Lazzaris F.D.P.
- Bishop of Balsas
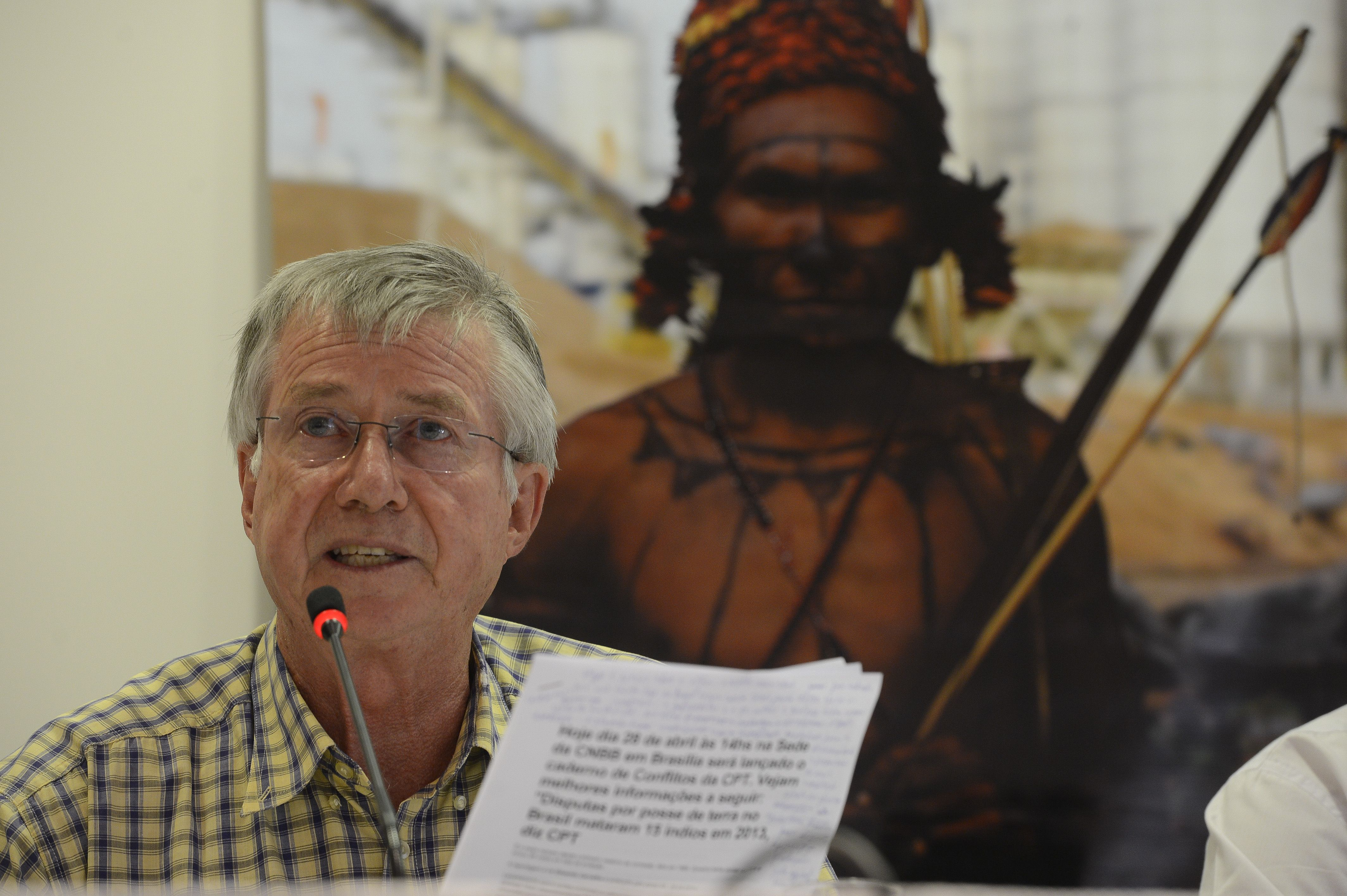
- Native name: Enemésio Angelo Lazzaris
- Church: Catholic Church
- Diocese: Diocese of Balsas
- In office: 12 December 2007 – 2 February 2020
- Predecessor: Gianfranco Masserdotti
- Successor: Valentim Fagundes de Meneses

Orders
- Ordination: 26 July 1975
- Consecration: 29 March 2008 by José Belisário da Silva

Personal details
- Born: 19 December 1948 Nova Belluno, Santa Catarina, United States of Brazil
- Died: 2 February 2020 (aged 71) Araguaína, Tocantins, Brazil

Enemésio Ângelo Lazzaris (19 December 1948 – 2 February 2020) was a Brazilian Roman Catholic bishop.

Lazzaris was born in Brazil and was ordained to the priesthood in 1975. He served as bishop of the Roman Catholic Diocese of Balsas, Brazil from 2008 until his death in 2020.
