= Casa de Azulejo =

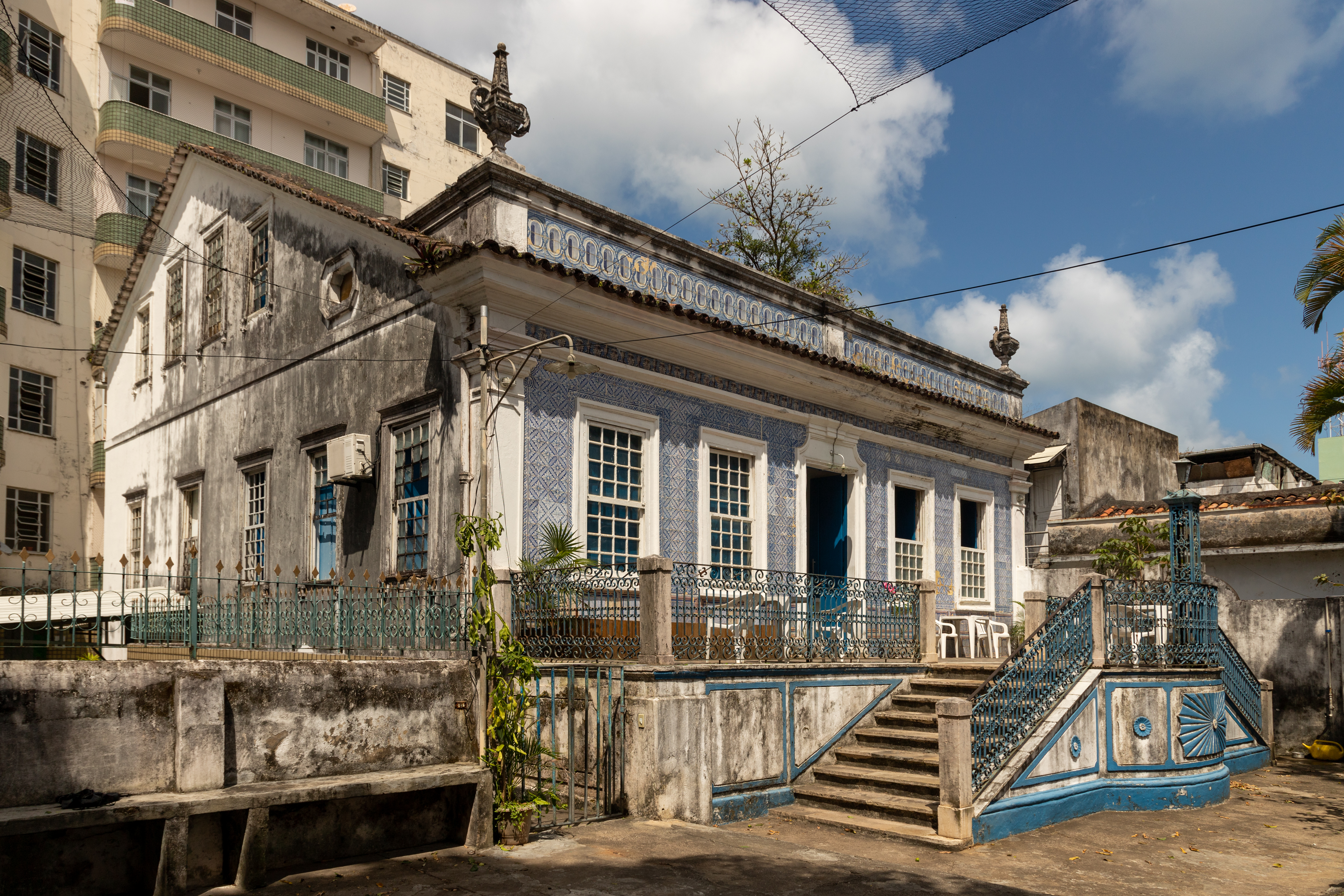
- Casa de Azulejo, Salvador, Brazil

- Location within Brazil
- Alternative names: Casa 65 da Rua do Genipapeiro

General information
- Type: residence, school building, guest house
- Location: Rua do Jenipapeiro, 65 - Saúde, Salvador, Bahia, 40040-580, Salvador, Bahia, Brazil
- Coordinates: 12.974722°S 38.505°W
- Inaugurated: 1861

Technical details
- Material: mixed masonry, azulejos
- Floor count: 1

The Casa de Azulejo (English: "House of Azulejos") is a 19th-century historic home in the Saúde neighborhood in Salvador, Bahia, Brazil. It was built in the mid-19th century as a large urban residence for the family of the businessman Joaquim Vitorino da Rocha, but its garden was lost to the dense urbanization of Salvador in the 20th century. The house retains its large collection of exterior azulejos, or Portuguese tiles. It additionally has an example of a large exterior staircase that appeared in Bahia in the late 18th century. The staircase additionally has a fine iron railing imported from Scotland.

It was listed as a historic structure of the State of Bahia by the Artistic and Cultural Institute of Bahia (IPAC) in 2002.

== History ==
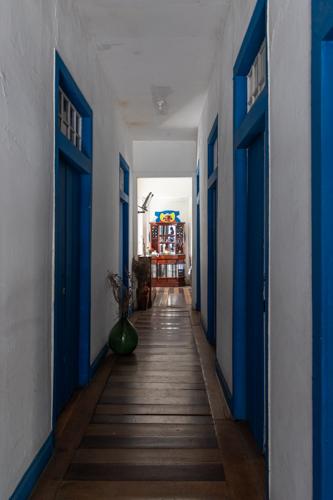
Interior hall

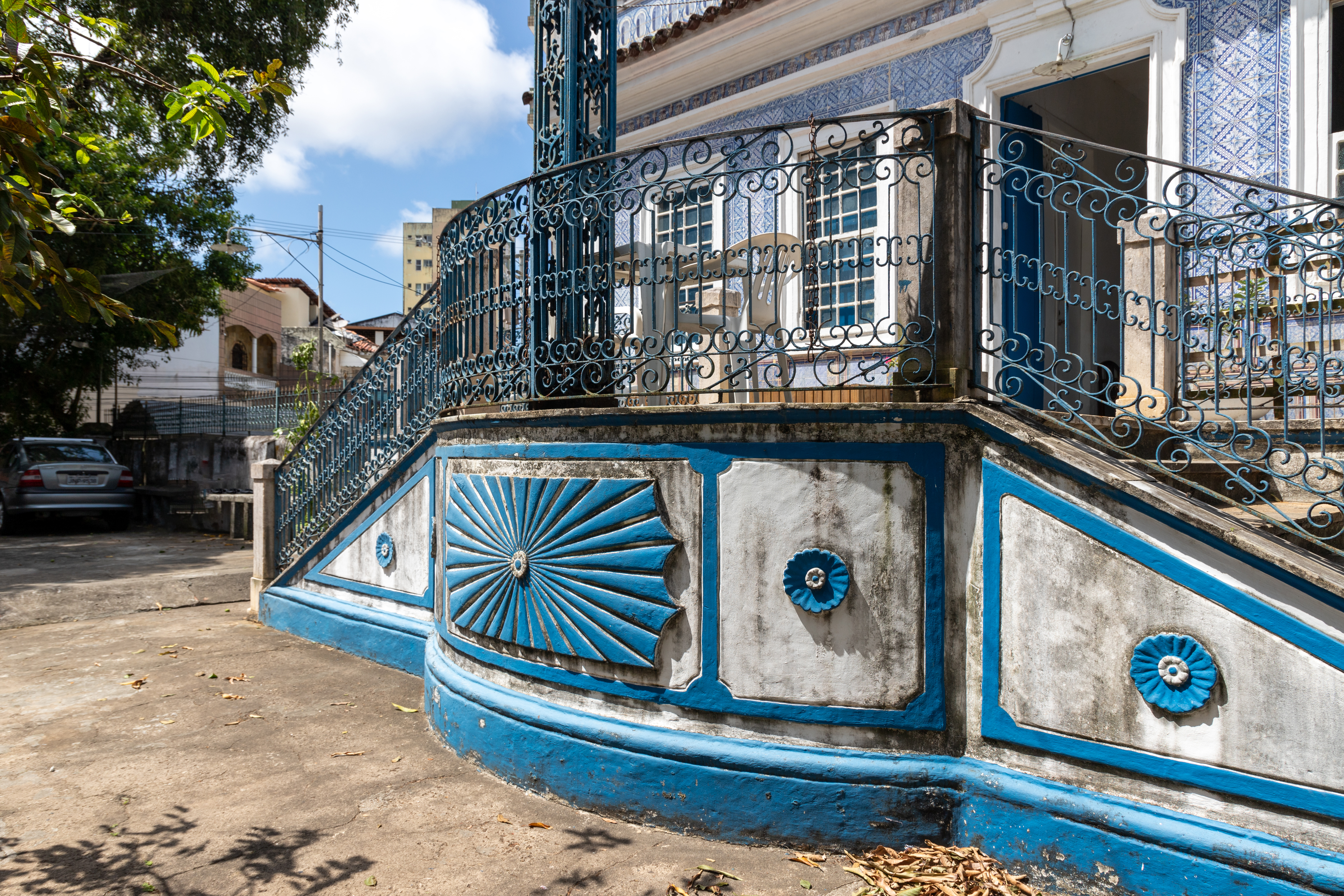
View of exterior staircase

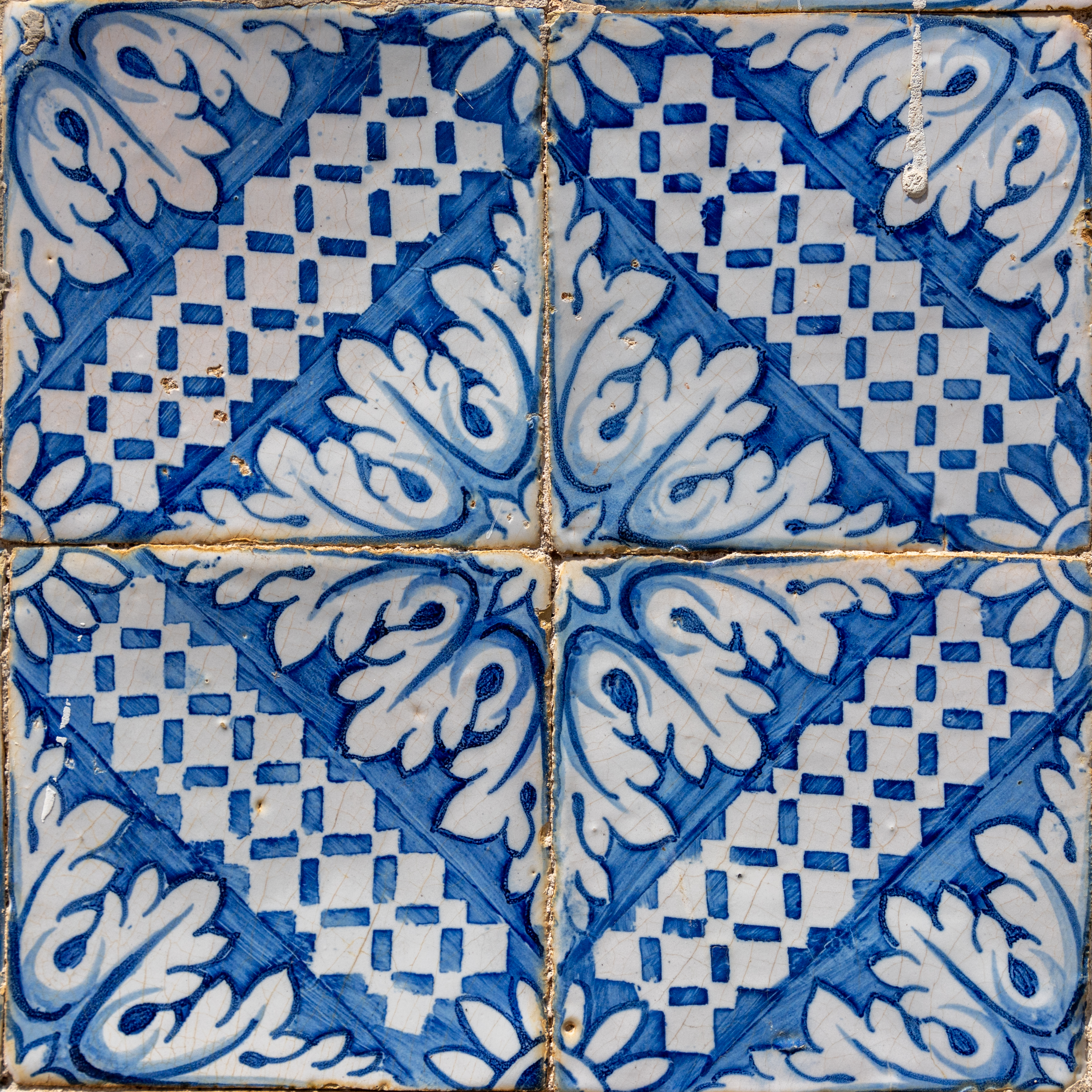
Detail of exterior blue-and-white azulejos

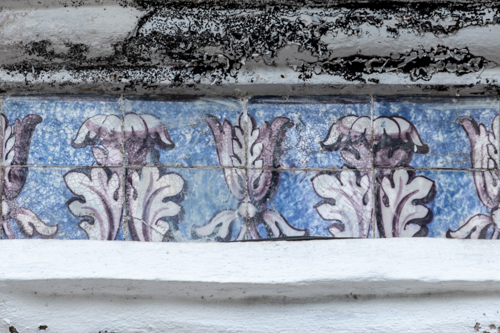
Detail of blue, white, and purple azulejos of cornice

The Casa de Azulejo was likely built in 1861 according to the inscription in the garden, now missing. It was owned by the businessman Joaquim Vitorino da Rocha and his wife Delfina de Azevedo Rocha; then by Manuel Francisco de Almeida Brandão and his wife Maria Emília de Almeida Brandão between 1868 and 1902. Albino Augusto de Novais e Silva and his wife Brasília Ferreira de Novais e Silva operated it as a small school, the Colégio Carneiro Ribeiro, between 1902 and 1912. The Casa do Azulejo was auctioned in 1914 and has undergone numerous alterations. It served as the Ana Néri School from 1954 to 1965, then as the headquarters of Construtora Raimundo Loureiro from 1965.

The urbanization of Salvador in the 20th century led to the reduction of the property and grounds of the Casa de Azulejo. Land was first ceded to construct a house on Rua Garcia D'Ávila; then, to another house facing Rua do Genipapeiro. A large part of the land was used for the construction of the high-rise Prisco Paraíso Building, which also required an alteration of a back corner of the house. The chapel was transferred to the Rio Pardo Farm during a renovation in the 20th century. The Casa do Azulejo now functions as a guest house.

== Structure ==
The Casa de Azulejo is built of mixed masonry of stone and brick on a rectangular plan. Houses in the mid-19th century in Salvador transitioned from a traditional Portuguese colonial two-story urban sobrado to a one-story house with a large garden. The house had a chapel that opened to the front and a large garden with fruit trees.

The façade has four large sash windows with a doorway at center, and is entirely covered in azulejos. They are primarily in blue and white, with polychromatic pieces around the doorway cornice. The basement of the house is high, and the house has hipped roof and thick walls.

=== Interior ===
The plan of the house, with its axis on a central distribution corridor to the bedrooms and alcoves, follows the model most frequently adopted in urban houses throughout the colonial period and the 19th century. It has an attic with lining that follows the two eaves of the roof and opens to the side.

=== Staircase and grounds ===
The Casa de Azulejo retains its patio and front staircase that connects the main floor directly to the garden. Residential gardens were common in Bahia in the 19th century, both for leisure and ventilation; few examples remain in Salvador. The garden of the Solar Bandeira is in disuse and mostly lost; the House at Rua Felipe Camarão, no. 34 retains its garden and fine embrachado mosaic tiles.

Staircases of appeared in Bahia in the late 18th century, notably at the Solar do Conde dos Arcos in 1781. An outstanding example can also be found at Casa Marback in the Bonfim neighborhood. The placement of a front staircase slowly spread across Bahia and was especially popular in the 19th century. The staircase and terrace have an elaborate iron railing fabricated in Scotland.

== Protected status ==
The Casa de Azulejo were listed as a historic structure by the Artistic and Cultural Institute of Bahia (IPAC) in 2002.

== Access ==
The house functions as a guest house and may be visited.
