= Diocese of Viana, Brazil =

Catholic ecclesiastical territory

Diocese of Viana Dioecesis Vianensis

Catholic

Location
- Country: Brazil
- Ecclesiastical province: São Luís do Maranhão

Statistics
- Area: 23,118 km^{2} (8,926 sq mi)
- Population: Total; Catholics: (as of 2004); 550,000; 460,000 (83.6%)

Information
- Rite: Latin Rite
- Established: 30 October 1962 (64 years ago)
- Cathedral: Catedral Nossa Senhora da Conceição

Current leadership
- Pope: Leo XIV
- Bishop: Evaldo Carvalho dos Santos, C.M.
- Metropolitan Archbishop: Gilberto Pastana de Oliveira
- Bishops emeritus: Xavier Gilles de Maupeou d'Ableiges

Website
- www.diocesedeviana.org.br

The Roman Catholic Diocese of Viana (Latin: Dioecesis Vianensis) is a diocese located in the city of Viana, in the ecclesiastical province of São Luís do Maranhão in Brazil.

== History ==
- 30 October 1962: Established as Diocese of Viana from the Metropolitan Archdiocese of São Luís do Maranhão

== Leadership ==
- Bishops of Viana (Roman rite), in reverse chronological order
  - Bishop Evaldo Carvalho dos Santos, C.M. (2019.02.20 – present)
  - Bishop Sebastião Lima Duarte (2010.07.07 – 2017.12.20), appointed Bishop of Caxias do Maranhão
  - Bishop Xavier Gilles de Maupeou d’Ableiges (1998.02.18 – 2010.07.07)
  - Bishop Adalberto Paulo da Silva, O.F.M. Cap. (1975.04.03 – 1995.05.24)
  - Bishop Francisco Hélio Campos (1969.04.14 – 1975.01.23)
  - Bishop Amleto de Angelis, M.S.C. (1963.05.30 – 1967.02.25)
