= Brejo =

Coordinates: 3.68389°S 42.75°W

- Municipality
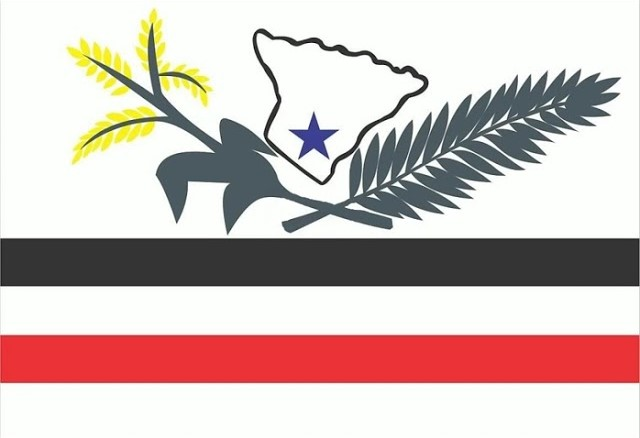
- Flag
- Interactive map of Brejo
- Country: Brazil
- Region: Nordeste
- State: Maranhão
- Mesoregion: Leste Maranhense

Population (2020)
  - Total: 36,651
- Time zone: UTC−3 (BRT)

Brejo is a municipality in the state of Maranhão in the Northeast region of Brazil.

== See also ==
- List of municipalities in Maranhão
