= João Lisboa Square =

Square in São Luis, Brazil

João Lisboa Plaza
- Largo do Carmo
- Praça João Lisboa
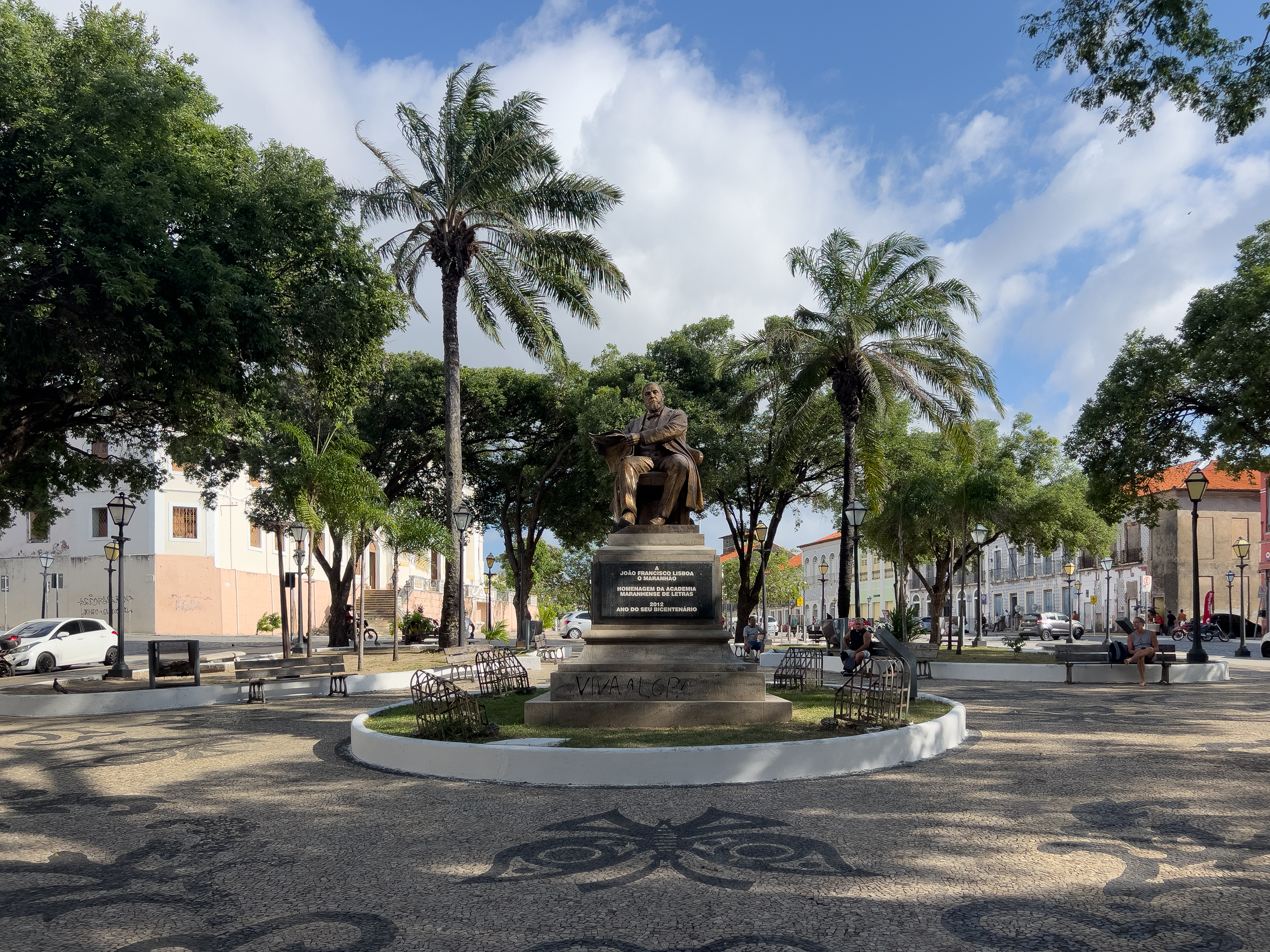

- Location within Brazil
- Coordinates: 2.52899°S 44.303224°W

National Historic Heritage of Brazil
- Designated: 1951
- Reference no.: 454

João Lisboa Square (Portuguese: Praça João Lisboa), fully known as Praça João Francisco de Lisboa, is a public square in the city of São Luís, Maranhão, Brazil. It is one of the oldest squares in the city, and the site of numerous historical events of the city and state. It was originally named Largo do Carmo, a reference to the large Church and Convent of Mount Carmel complex adjacent to the square. It was renamed Praça João Lisboa in honor of journalist and writer João Francisco Lisboa in 1901.

The public square was reduced in size over time, especially with the motorization and road construction in São Luís in the 20th century. The square was divided into two parts with the addition Rua do Paz to the Historic Center; the northern section (between Rua da Paz and Rua do Sol) is popularly referred to as Praça João Lisboa, and the southern section as the Largo do Carmo, its former name.

The public square is part of the UNESCO World Heritage Site of the Historic Center of São Luís; it was separately listed as a historic site by the National Institute of Historic and Artistic Heritage (IPHAN) in 1951.

Praça João Lisboa remains "the heart, the soul, and the nerve center of the city." It has numerous shade trees, a mosaic tiled walkways with strongly contrasting light and dark tiling, and symmetrical flowerbeds. The square is surrounded by large ensemble of historic structures of São Luís, especially the tall urban townhouses (sobrados) faced in azulejos, a symbol of the city.

== History ==
Praça João Lisboa, or the Largo do Carmo, dates to the earliest settlement of São Luís by the French and Portuguese. The square was the site of a battle between the Dutch and the Portuguese in 1643 as part of the larger Dutch invasions of Brazil. The Carmelite Convent was one of the largest buildings in São Luís prior to the invasion, and was relentlessly attacked by the Dutch. The Portuguese soon occupied the Carmelite Convent as a garrison; the Carmelite clergy remained, and rallied both Portuguese and indigenous peoples against the Dutch. The Dutch were defeated in a battle at the Largo do Carmo by the troops of Sergeant-Major Antônio Teixeira de Melo; the battle ended the Dutch invasion of Maranhão. The convent continued to house the Portuguese colonial Artillery Corps and the Police Corps after the battle.

The square then became the center of cultural life of São Luís from the Portuguese colonial period. It was the site of the city's first public market and fair, religious festivals, the first public shelter. The Portuguese erected a marble pillory in the square, and carried out the torture and execution of numerous African slaves in the Largo do Carmo. The pillory was destroyed in 1888 after the proclamation of the Brazilian Republic.^{A} The square was also a meeting place in the evening for intellectuals of São Luís in this period, giving a corner of the park the name "the little senate".

The square was also the site of the procession of Our Lady of Mount Carmel, a feast day of the Church and Convent of Mount Carmel. It also hosted several historical, political, and social events of São Luís. It was also home to numerous pharmacies, some of which operated day and night.

=== 20th century ===
Numerous changes were made to the square at the beginning of the 20th century. Governor Luís Domingues renamed the square in honor of João Lisboa on July 28, 1901. Lisboa (1812-1863) was born in the interior of Maranhão and became a celebrated author and journalist both in the state and Brazil. The Domingues government hired Jean Magrou, a French sculptor, to design a monument dedicated to João Lisboa in 1911. Magrou's work remained at the Palácio do Leões until 1918. It was installed in the square by Governor Antônio Brício de Araújo. The monument has a bronze sculpture of João Lisboa with a marble pedestal; it additionally contains the ashes of the journalist, who died in Lisbon.

Senator Vitorino Freire, a powerful senator from Maranhão, led protests of the Coligadas Oppositions, a political group opposed to the election of governor José Sarney. Sarney later became the first civilian president after more than twenty years of military dictatorship in Brazil. The square, however, declined in the 20th century as part of the real estate crisis of the Historic Center of São Luís. Many commercial establishments and hotels closed, never to be reoccupied. The Hotel Ribamar, a favored hotel of politicians of the interior of Maranhão, the Casa Branca shirt shop, the Fonte Maravilhosa snack bar, and numerous pharmacies.

== Footnotes ==
A.The pillory was allegedly destroyed in 1888, however, research by Euges Lima confirms that part of the structure served as the basis for a monument in Praça Manoel Beckman.
