= Catedral de São Luís =

Metropolitan Cathedral of Our Lady of Victory
- Catedral de Nossa Senhora da Vitória
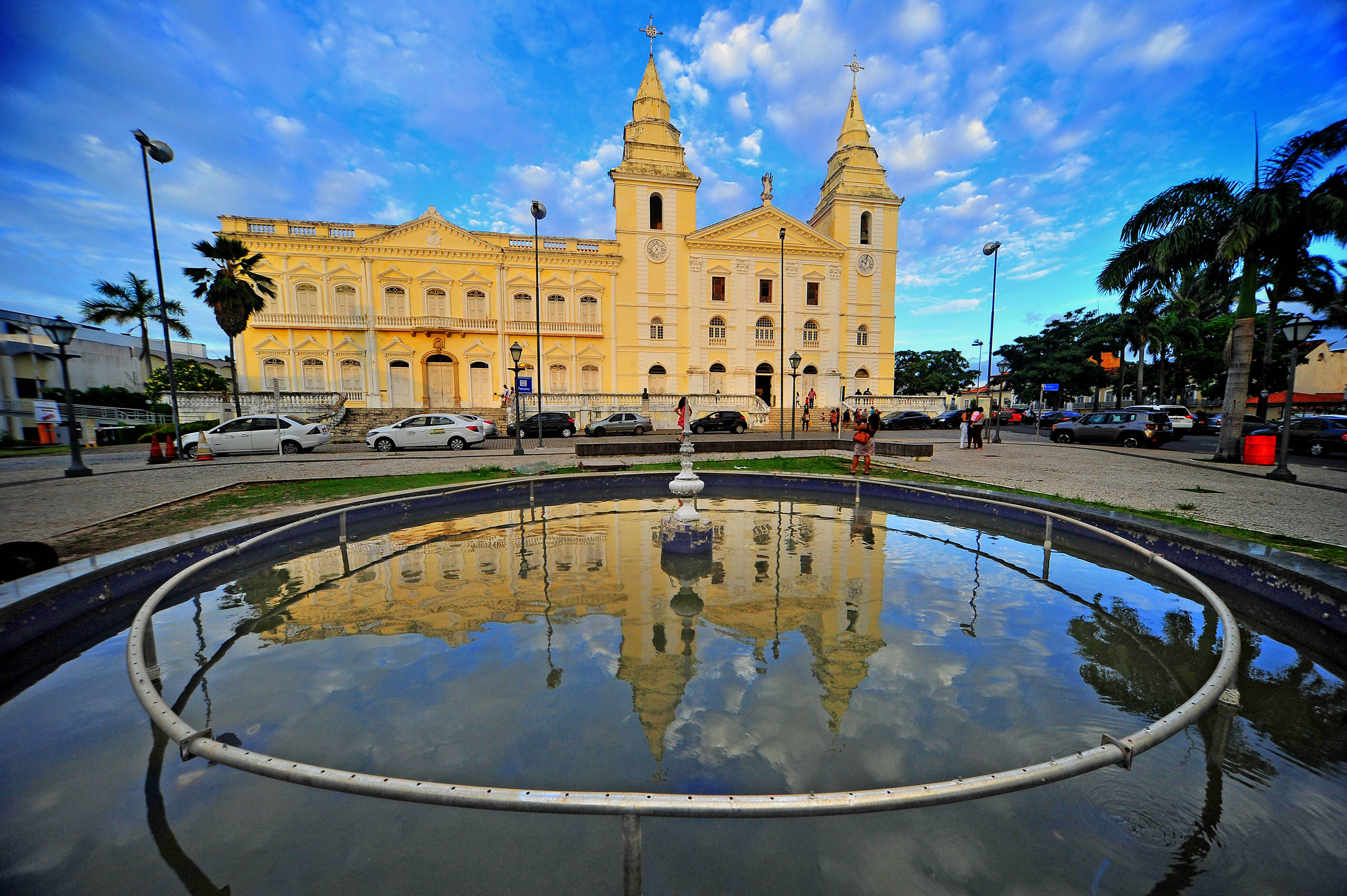
- Façade of the Metropolitan Cathedral of Our Lady of Victory, São Luís, Maranhão, Brazil

- Location of the Catedral Basílica de Salvador

Religion
- Affiliation: Catholic
- Province: Roman Catholic Diocese of São Luís do Maranhão
- Rite: Roman Rite

Location
- Municipality: São Luís
- State: Maranhão
- Country: Brazil
- Interactive map of Metropolitan Cathedral of Our Lady of Victory
- Coordinates: 2°31′41″S 44°18′17″W

Catedral de São Luís ("Cathedral of Our Lady of Victory") is the seat of the Roman Catholic Diocese of São Luís do Maranhão. It is located in Plaza Pedro II in the center of São Luís, Maranhão, Brazil. It is an important monument in the city's historic center, which was declared a World Heritage Site by UNESCO.

== History ==
The current cathedral structure was initially built as a college and church of the Society of Jesus. In 1622 the Jesuit priests Luís Figueira and Benedito Amodei began the construction of a college and church on the site of a hermitage built by French Capuchins during the time of Equinoctial France. The Jesuits completed the College and Church of Our Lady of Light (Colégio e Igreja de Nossa Senhora da Luz) on the site. New construction began in 1690 designed by the Jesuit João Felipe Bettendorff; it was built with indigenous labor and inaugurated in 1699. Next to the church was the Jesuit College, a large cultural center in the region. The college had 5,000 volumes in its library by 1760.

The Jesuits were expelled from Brazil in 1759 and their assets passed to the Portuguese crown. In 1761, in an urban reform ordered by governor Joaquim de Melo e Póvoas, the old Cathedral was demolished to provide ventilation to the Governor's Palace. The Jesuit buildings, which were unoccupied, gained new uses: the college became the bishops' palace and the Company's church became the city's cathedral. The current decorative feature of the palace is derived from a renovation in the 19th century. The cathedral's façade was modified at the beginning of the 20th century, when it gained two towers. It was elevated to the seat of archdiocese between 1921 and 1922.

== Retable of the Metropolitan Cathedral ==
The Cathedral's highlight is the gilded retable on the main altar. It was created at the end of the 17th century, designed by Brother João Felipe Bettendorff, and executed by Portuguese carver Manuel Manços, assisted by carvers from Maranhão linked to the Society of Jesus. It is one of the best examples of a Baroque retable in colonial Brazil. It was slightly altered at the beginning of the 19th century. The altarpiece was listed by National Institute of Historic and Artistic Heritage (IPHAN) in 1954.

== See also ==
- List of Catholic churches in Brazil
- List of Jesuit sites
