= Balconet =

False balcony

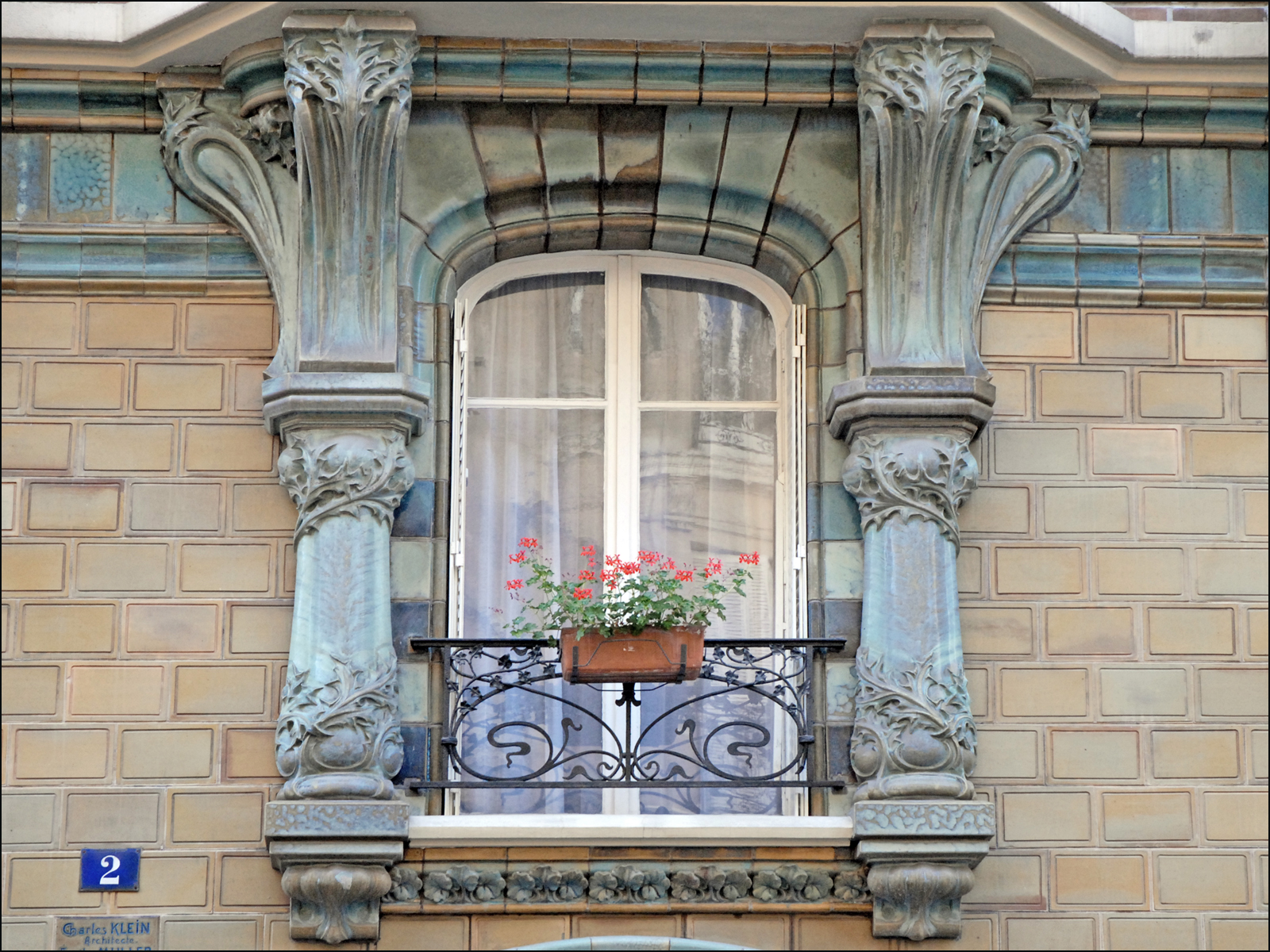
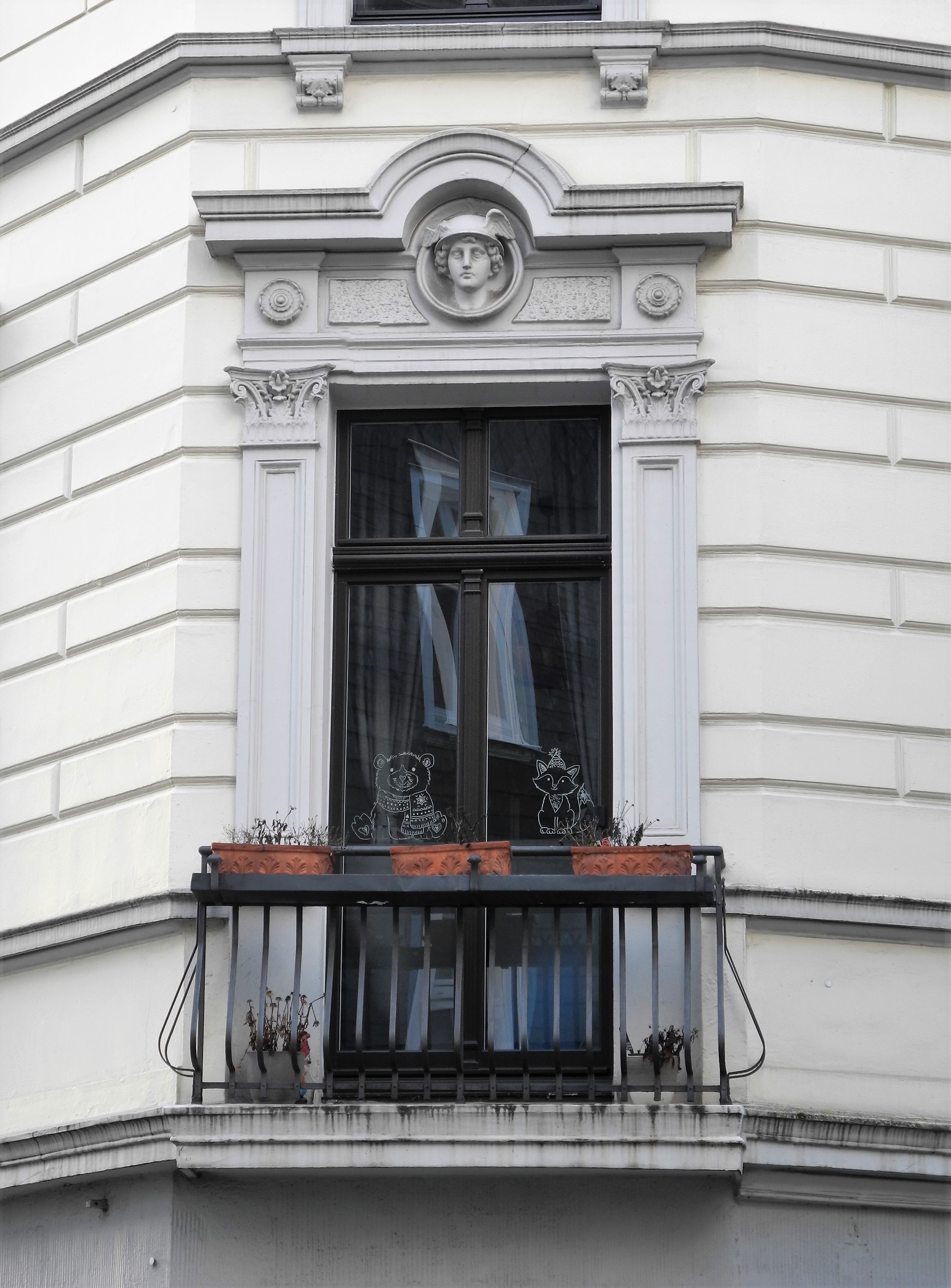
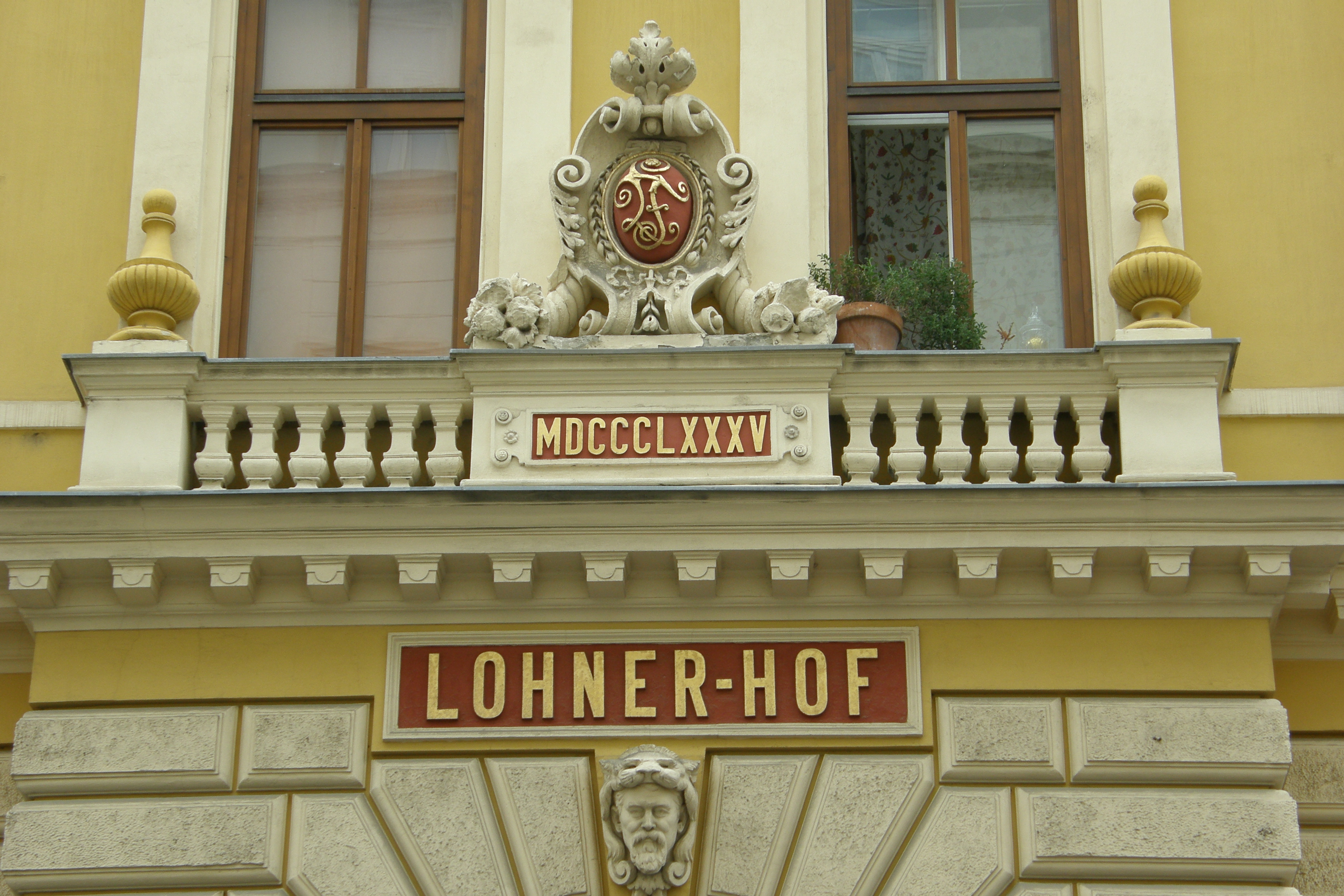
Various examples of balconets

Balconet or balconette is an architectural term to describe a false balcony, or railing at the outer plane of a window-opening reaching to the floor, and having, when the window is open, the appearance of a balcony. They are common in France, Portugal, Spain, and Italy. They are often referred to as Juliet balconies after the scene from Shakespeare's play Romeo and Juliet. The wall-opening appearing alongside a balconette is referred to as a French window.

A prominent example of a balconette is on the Palazzo Labia in Venice.

== Balconette brassieres ==
The term has also been applied to a style of brassiere featuring low-cut cups and wide set straps that give the appearance of a square neckline. The name "balconette" came from men in the balcony of a theatre looking down upon women. A balconette bra could not be seen from above.

== Materials ==
Balconets or Juliet balconies can be made from various materials. As they used to be made out of stone quite often, with modern advances there have been more options to create aesthetically pleasing balconets. Newer Juliet balconies can range from glass panels to stainless steel, to provide a more modern look to a building.

== See also ==
- French window
