= São Luís-Teresina Railway =

Brazilian railroad

- EF-225
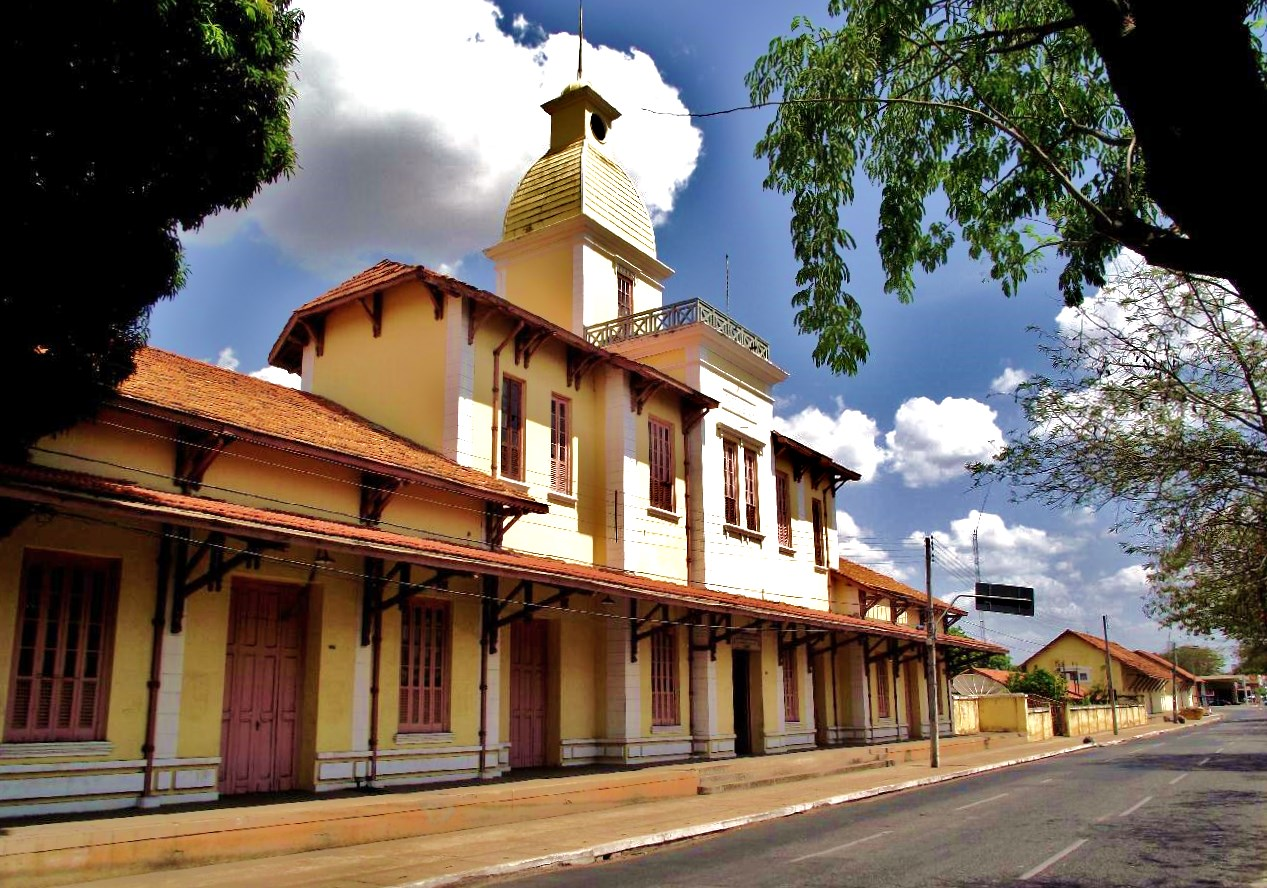
- Teresina Railway Station.

Overview
- Current operator: Ferrovia Transnordestina Logística
- Locale: Maranhão; Piauí

Technical
- Track gauge: Metre-gauge railway 1,000 millimetres (3.3 ft)
- Length: 454 kilometres (282 mi)

The São Luís-Teresina Railway (Portuguese: Ferrovia São Luís-Teresina), also known as the EF-225, connects the cities of São Luís (MA) and Teresina (PI), passing through Timon, Caxias, Codó, Timbiras, Coroatá, Pirapemas, Cantanhede, Itapecuru Mirim, Santa Rita, Rosário and Bacabeira, along approximately 454 kilometers.

== History ==
In the 19th century, the economy of Maranhão was based on the export of cotton and operated by steamship companies on the Itapecuru River, which bordered the producing regions, such as the municipality of Caxias. São Luís, the capital of Maranhão, had a textile industrial park and required a more efficient form of transportation. As a result, a railway line was planned to link the main cotton-producing center with São Luís and connect the largest urban centers in Maranhão. It should also supply other products, especially babassu, whose oil was beginning to be purchased by Europe.

Despite the need for a railroad, construction only took place in the 20th century, which contributed to the decline in the cotton economy. In 1895, the line connecting Caxias to the village of Cajazeiras (now Timon), on the banks of the Parnaíba River, was inaugurated. In 1905, Federal Law no. 1329 was passed, ordering the construction of a railroad between São Luís and Caxias. Former President Afonso Pena visited Maranhão, took a trip down the Itapecuru River in the company of the then Governor Benedito Leite, noticed the difficulty of navigation and authorized the construction of the railway.

The stretch from São Luís to Caximbos (district of Cantanhede) was opened in 1919 and extended to Caxias in 1920. The Benedito Leite Metallic Bridge over the Mosquitos Strait, linking the Upaon-açu Island to the mainland, was completed in 1928. On March 5, 1921, celebrated as the official inauguration, a train departed from Cajazeiras to Rosário. João Pessoa Station, in the center of São Luís, was inaugurated in 1929. Until 1938, the train came from São Luís and stopped at Timon station, a town near Teresina. In 1938, the tracks reached Teresina after the João Luis Ferreira Metallic Bridge was opened. The first trip between the cities of São Luís and Teresina took place on December 31, 1938. The railroad was incorporated into Rede Ferroviária Federal (RFFSA) in 1957.

In São Luís, the railroad is divided into two branches: a 17 kilometers mixed-gauge branch to the Port of Itaqui built in the 1970s, which allows Carajás Railway trains to circulate past the junction at Pombinho Station; and a 14 kilometers branch to the Tirirical district, where the Ferrovia Transnordestina Logística (FTL) Yard is located. The stretch that goes through Campo de Perizes, in Bacabeira, required the removal of its tracks in the process of widening BR-135, to accommodate the central median that separates the two lanes. The new tracks were fixed alongside the widened roadway, completed in 2018.

== Privatization ==
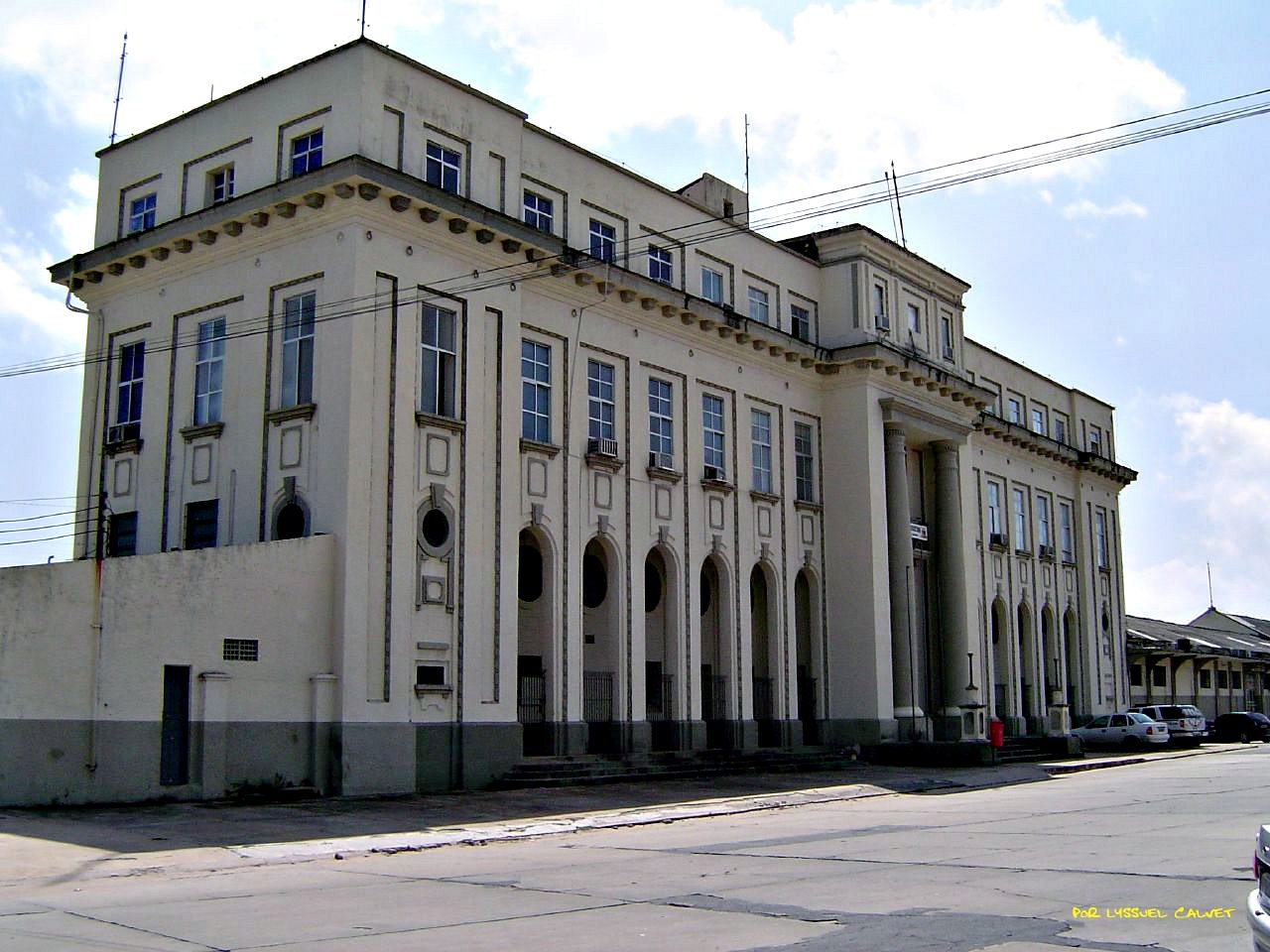
Former headquarters of the Rede Ferroviária Federal (RFFSA) in São Luís.

In the 1990s, the lines were transferred to Companhia Ferroviária do Nordeste (CFN), which changed its name to Transnordestina Logística. In 2013, it was divided into Ferrovia Transnordestina Logística (FTL), which is responsible for operating the metric-gauge lines of Malha I; and Transnordestina Logística S.A. (TLSA), responsible for Malha II, with a broad and mixed gauge under construction. Currently, the railroad is mainly used to transport fuel between the Port of Itaqui (São Luís) and Teresina.

== Cargo transportation ==
In 2012, the Port of Itaqui was responsible for 54.2% of the gasoline and 49.8% of the diesel imported into Brazil. In the same year, 1 million liters of gasoline and 1.3 million liters of diesel oil arrived daily in Teresina, 60% arrives by rail and 40% by road. Every day, 40 wagons with a capacity of 42,000 liters were unloaded in Teresina. In 2014, there were averages of over 1,500 wagons loaded per month, with a total of 712,000 cubic meters in the year.

In 2018, the railroad transported cement to São Luís, as well as corrective limestone, clinker, containers and wooden pallets via the junction with the Teresina-Fortaleza Railway, enabling interconnection between the ports of Itaqui (MA), Pecém (CE) and Mucuripe (CE). In the same year, around 742 million liters of fuel were transported by rail. Pulp is transported between the Suzano unit in Imperatriz (MA) and São Luís by Valor da Logística Integrada (VLI) on the North-South Railway (FNS) and the Carajás Railway (EFC). Access to the Port of Itaqui, where Suzano has a warehouse, is handled by Transnordestina Logística. In 2020, this movement reached 9.4 million tons of pulp.

== Passenger trains ==
There were passenger trains on the line until the 1980s. Most of the stations are in ruins, but some have been preserved by local governments.

Name	Location	Opening date	Current use
São Luis (previously called Urbano Santos and João Pessoa)	São Luís (MA)	1921	Closed since 2015
Tirirical	São Luís (MA)	1986	Companhia Ferroviária do Nordeste (CFN) yard
Araracanga (previously called Maracanã)	São Luís (MA)	1921	Demolished
Piçarra (previously called Pedrinhas)	São Luís (MA)	1930	Abandoned and in ruins
Mandubé (previously called Estiva)	São Luís (MA)	1921	Unknown
Perizes	Rosário (MA)	1921	Unknown
Rosário	Rosário (MA)	1919	Abandoned
Recurso	Santa Rita (MA)	1919	Abandoned
Carema	Santa Rima (MA)	1919	Commercial
Itapecuru	Itapecuru Mirim (MA)	1919	Abandoned
Itapiracó (previously called Jundiaí)	Itapecuru Mirim (MA)	1919	Unknown
Cantanhede	Cantanhede (MA)	1919	Abandoned
Pirapemas	Cantanhede (MA)	1920	Unknown
Ajugaiaba	Coroatá (MA)	1948	Unknown
Coroatá	Coroatá (MA)	1920	Abandoned
Timbiras	Timbiras (MA)	1920	Abandoned and in ruins
Boa Esperança	Codó (MA)	Unknown	Abandoned
Codó	Codó (MA)	1920	Cultural center
Jacama	Codó (MA)	1920	Abandoned
Côcos	Codó (MA)	1920	Abandoned
Riachão	Caxias (MA)	1929	Unknown
Caxias	Caxias (MA)	1915	Unknown
Cristino Cruz	Caxias (MA)	1895	Demolished
Aarão Reis	Caxias (MA)	1895	Demolished
Timon (previously called Cajazeiras and Flores)	Timon (MA)	1948	Abandoned
Teresina	Teresina (PI)	1926	Metro station and museum

== Culture ==
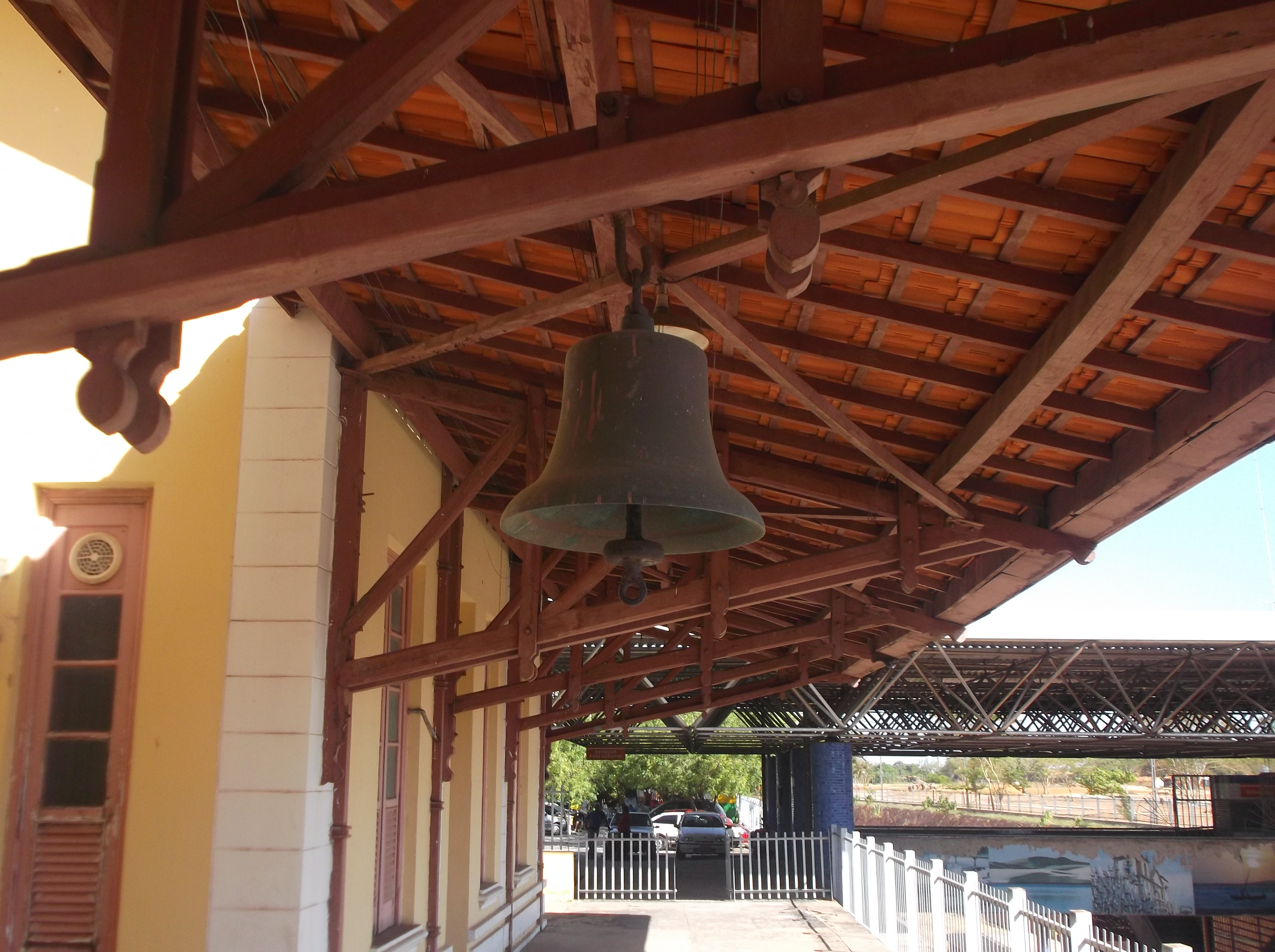
Teresina Railway Station bell.

The São Luís-Teresina Railway was essential for the people who still live in the valleys of the Itapecuru, Mearim and Pindaré rivers, contributing to Maranhão's economic activity and the cultural formation of the region. It also promoted the supply of raw materials and the transportation of goods for the commerce of the main cities in Maranhão and served to transport a large number of passengers. The João Pessoa Station in São Luís, which housed the railroad's administration and was a point of embarkation and disembarkation until the 1980s until it was transferred to the Tirirical neighborhood, was listed as a historic heritage site in 1986. In November 2020, the Maranhão Railway and Port Museum was inaugurated with the construction of a square in honor of carnival artist Joãosinho Trinta and an exhibition of the Benedito Leite locomotive.

The landmark decree for the Teresina Railway Station, which opened in 1926, was published on March 25, 2013, in recognition of the building as a symbol of Brazil's integration process. The measure also provided for the construction of the Citizenship Park and included music and dance schools, a library, a cinema and an amphitheater.

== See also ==
- North-South Railway
- Carajás Railway
