= Campo de Perizes =

Fluvial-marine plain in Northeast Region, Brazil

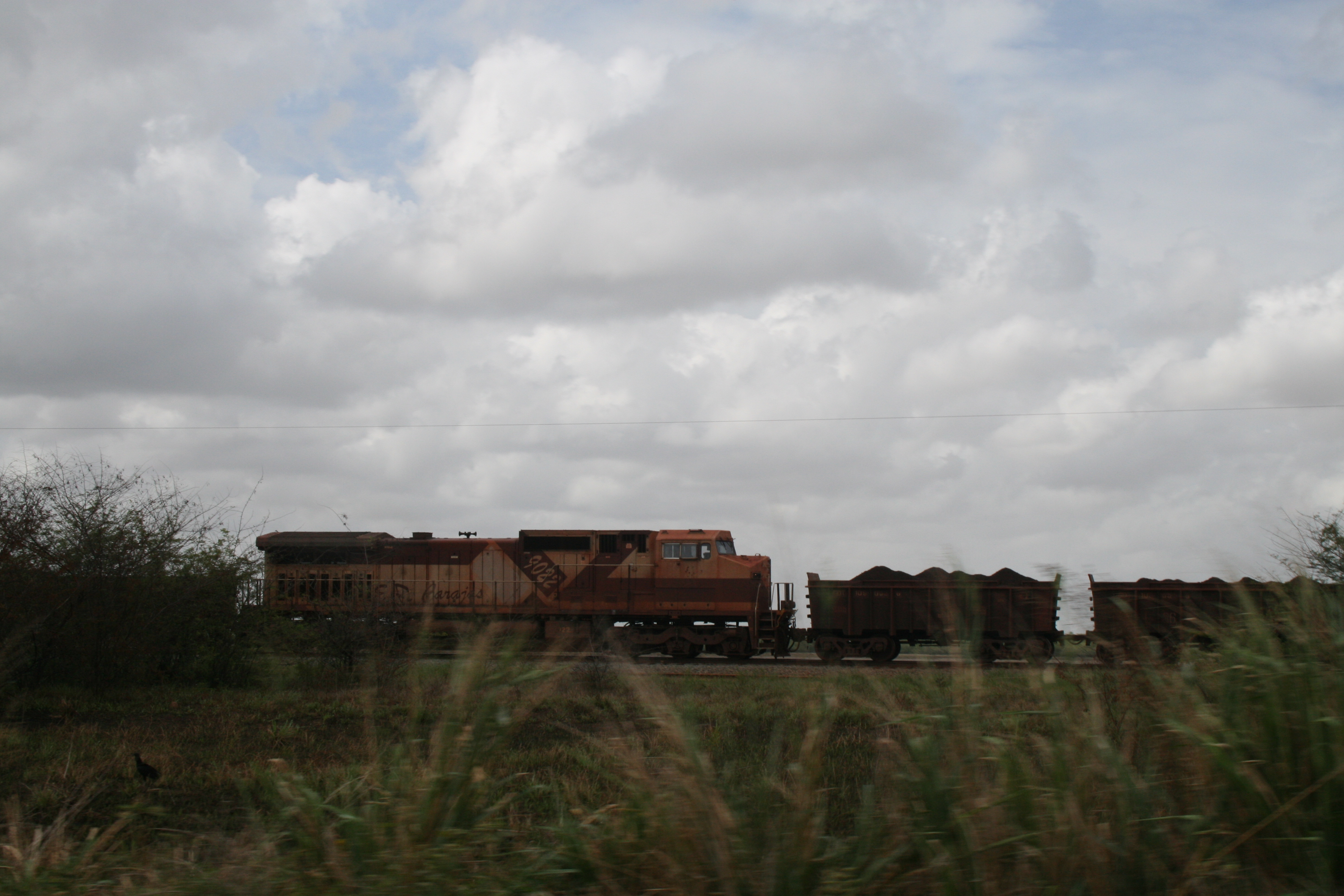
- Carajás Railway em Bacabeira

Ecology
- Biome: Grassland, Amazon, Cerrado

Geography
- Country: Brazil
- Coordinates: 2°47′06″S 44°21′18″W
- Geology: Fluvial-marine plain
- Rivers: Perizes River

Campo de Perizes is an extensive fluvial-marine plain, with halophilous floodplain grasslands, located between the cities of São Luís, Bacabeira, and Rosário, in the Golfão Maranhense region.

== Geography ==
The Golfão and Baixada Maranhense region was shaped by successive movements of marine transgression and regression over thousands of years.

The Mosquitos Strait separates the island of Upaon-Açu from the continent and connects the Bays of São Marcos and São José/Arraial. Over it, the Marcelino Machado Bridge was built, consisting of an entrance bridge and an exit bridge; the Benedito Leite Metallic Bridge, belonging to the São Luís-Teresina Railway; the duplicated bridge of the Carajás Railway; and the metallic bridge that supports the Italuís water main, which takes water from the Itapecuru River to the city of São Luís.

The coast of Maranhão is marked by the presence of mangroves; a plant formation of arboreal or shrubby size, adapted to marshy terrain, subject to the direct influence of tides and salinity. It is adapted to the brackish environment, at the outfall of rivers into the sea, where specialized vegetation grows, with a rich variety of aquatic species.

In areas contiguous to the mangroves, especially in the Golfão Maranhense region, there are extensive flat areas, subject to periodic flooding and with a predominantly herbaceous stratum, locally called Campo de Perizes. Some of the existing species are the piri or piripiri (Cyperus giganteus), which inspired the place's name; the aturiá (Machaerium lunatum); canarana (Panicum spp); as well as reeds from the Cyperaceae family.

The Perizes River flows through the region, which is also close to the outfalls of the Itapecuru River (to the east) and the Mearim River (to the west). Some consider the Perizes field to be part of the Baixada Maranhense region.

In May 2018, the new Italuís pipeline went into operation, replacing 20 kilometers of piping in the Campo de Perizes region. The Italuís System was set up in 1982 and supplies 60% of the homes in the capital of Maranhão. The deterioration over time contributed to the pipeline's frequent ruptures, compounded by the area's salinity, which accelerates corrosion. The new pipeline enabled a reported 30% increase in water flow.

== Environmental protection ==
The Upaon-Açu/Miritiba/Alto Preguiças Environmental Protection Area was set up to preserve the region, which has experienced significant changes due to anthropization, with discussions about creating new conservation units.

== Duplication of BR-135 ==
The Campo de Perizes is crossed by the BR-135 highway (Km 25 to Km 51.3), the only highway access to São Luís, with a daily traffic of more than 25,000 vehicles, providing access to the Itaqui port complex and Ponta da Madeira. In 2018, its duplication work was completed between São Luís (Estiva, Km 25) and Bacabeira, where car accidents have been reported over the 26 km extension. The work involved the construction of a viaduct in Bacabeira (Km 51), allowing access to the city of Rosário, at the junction with the BR-402 highway, the gateway to Barreirinhas and the Lençóis Maranhenses. Work on the stretch, which began in 2012, cost R$ 503 million.

Due to the soft soil and subject to flooding, especially in Campo de Perizes, the road engineering involved the use of soil improvement technology with gravel columns every 2 meters, with a depth of between 5 and 18 meters, along almost 18 km, used for the first time in Brazil on a long stretch. The São Luís-Teresina railroad tracks and the Italuís system water main, which bordered the highway, were relocated.

The presence of the highway, together with electrical, railway, and supply infrastructures, as well as irregular urban expansion, are contributing factors to changes in the ecosystem of Campo de Perizes and other conservation units.

== See also ==
- São Luís-Teresina Railway
- Upaon-Açu/Miritiba/Alto Preguiças Environmental Protection Area
- Carajás Railway
