= Parnaíba Thermal Power Complex =

Thermoelectric complex in Maranhão, Brazil

- Location of the Parnaíba Thermal Power Complex
- Country: Brazil
- Location: Santo Antônio dos Lopes, Maranhão
- Coordinates: 04°29′25″S 44°21′28″W
- Commission date: February 1, 2013
- Owner: Eneva
- Operator: Eneva

Power generation
- Nameplate capacity: 1,814 MW

External links
- Website: eneva.com.br/nossos-negocios/geracao-de-energia/complexo-do-parnaiba/

The Parnaíba Thermal Power Complex (Portuguese: Complexo Termelétrico Parnaíba) is a set of thermal power plants located in the Brazilian city of Santo Antônio dos Lopes, in the state of Maranhão. The gas used in power generation is produced in fields located near the complex. With 1.8 GW of installed capacity, it is currently the second largest natural gas-fired power station in Brazil.

== Natural gas in Maranhão ==
=== Initial research ===
Oil exploration began in the Parnaíba Basin at the end of the 1940s with two wells being drilled in Maranhão by the National Petroleum Council (CNP). Between the 1960s and 1980s, research was carried out by Petrobras and contract companies. However, the volume of data acquired during this period was considered insufficient due to the large size of the basin. In June 2002, the National Agency of Petroleum, Natural Gas and Biofuels (ANP) offered exploration blocks in the Parnaíba Basin in the fourth bidding round, but no blocks were acquired.

In 2007, in the ANP's ninth bidding round, some sectors were acquired by Petra Energia (PN-T-48/49/50/67/68/84/85), Devon (PN-T-66), Petrobras (PN-T-86) and Comp (PN-T-102). In September 2009, OGX, the oil and natural gas branch of the EBX group, announced the purchase of a 70% stake in seven onshore blocks belonging to Petra Energia, which remained with 30%.

=== Discovery and production ===
Drilling activities began on July 5, 2010. On August 12, 2010, OGX announced the discovery of natural gas reserves in well 1-OGX-16-MA, in block PN-T-68. A new discovery was made in the OGX-16 well on September 2 and on November 17 and 26 discoveries were made in the OGX-22 well. In September 2011, OGX Maranhão acquired a 50% stake in the onshore exploration block PN-T-102 in the Parnaíba basin held by the companies Imetame Energia S.A., DELP Engenharia Mecânica Ltda. and Orteng Equipamentos e Sistemas Ltda.

In September 2012, OGX Maranhão obtained an operating license to start production in the Parnaíba Basin at the Gavião Azul and Gavião Real fields. Commercial gas production began in January 2013. Currently, gas exploration in the Parnaíba Basin is carried out by the company Eneva and has the capacity to produce 8.4 million cubic meters of gas per day. It has installed 153 kilometers of gas pipelines at an investment cost of R$9 billion.

The largest natural gas producing states in 2021 were: Rio de Janeiro (64%); São Paulo (12.4%); Amazonas (10.15%); Maranhão (4.38%); Espírito Santo (4.09%); Bahia (4.06%); Ceará/Rio Grande do Norte (0.50%); Sergipe/Alagoas (0.45%). Maranhão is a pioneer in onshore gas exploration and transportation via pipelines to a thermoelectric plant and the second largest onshore gas producer in Brazil. The cities involved in gas exploration are: Lima Campos, Santo Antônio dos Lopes, Capinzal do Norte, Trizidela do Vale and Pedreiras.

=== Plant construction ===
In August 2011, the Maranhão III TPP project won the A-3 auction held by the Brazilian Electricity Regulatory Agency (ANEEL). The MC2 Nova Venecia 2 TPP (Parnaíba III) and Parnaíba I (a combination of the Maranhão IV and Maranhão V plants) originated from projects that had won the A-5/2008 Auction to be built in other locations and were transferred to the Parnaíba Complex project.

On January 19, 2013, Parnaíba I began supplying energy to the National Interconnected System (SIN) on a test basis through the operation of the first turbine; it received commercial authorization on February 1, 2013. On February 8, the second turbine went into operation. The third turbine started commercial operation on March 16 and the fourth on April 5.

The first generating unit of Parnaíba III (MC2 Nova Venecia 2) started commercial operation on October 14, 2013, and the second on February 18, 2014. Parnaíba IV started commercial operation on December 13, 2013, and Parnaíba II (Maranhão III) on July 1, 2016.

== Property ==
Eneva operates a concession area of more than 40,000 square kilometers in the Parnaíba Basin. It also owns the Porto do Itaqui Thermal Power Plant in São Luís, which can produce up to 360 MW and is powered by coal. It has ten commercial fields in Maranhão: five in production (Gavião Real, Gavião Vermelho, Gavião Branco, Gavião Caboclo, Gavião Azul and Gavião Preto) and five under development (Gavião Branco Norte, Gavião Tesoura, Gavião Carijó, Gavião Belo and Gavião Mateiro). It also has seven Discovery Assessment Plans (PADs), seven exploration blocks obtained in the ANP's 13th Bid Round in 2015 and five blocks obtained in the ANP's 14th Bid Round in 2017.

The gas is produced based on demand from the Parnaíba Complex. Onshore non-associated gas is more competitive in terms of the cost of discovery, development and production per cubic meter, resulting in the generation of energy at more attractive costs for the Brazilian electricity system. In 2017, Eneva reached the milestone of more than 100 wells drilled in the Parnaíba Basin.

== New projects ==
In the 2018 A-6 New Energy Auction, a new project provided for the installation of the Parnaíba V TPP, which would add 386 MW of power to the complex. It should generate energy through the combined cycle, using the steam generated from the heat produced by Parnaíba I (a combination of the Maranhão IV and Maranhão V plants), without the need for additional natural gas to generate energy.

In the A-6 Auction held in October 2019, another project included the construction of the Parnaíba VI project with a capacity of 92 MW, also using the combined cycle. It is the result of the expansion of the MC2 Nova Venécia 2 thermal power plant (178 MW), which will increase to 270 MW. The total capacity of the complex should increase to 1.9 GW.

== Energy capacity ==
The complex is divided into:

- Maranhão IV, with 337.6 MW;
- Maranhão V, with 337.6 MW;
- MC2 Nova Venecia 2, with 178 MW;
- Maranhão III, with 519 MW;
- Parnaíba IV, with 56 MW;
- Parnaíba V, with 385.7 MW.

== Reservoir-to-Wire model ==
The reservoir-to-wire (R2W) model consists of thermal generation in the vicinity of onshore natural gas producing fields. The energy produced in the Parnaíba Complex is sent to the National Interconnected System (SIN) via the transmission network that passes nearby.

== See also ==
- Suzano Maranhão Thermal Power Plant
- Thermal power station
