= Diones =

Brazilian footballer (born 1985)

Personal information
- Full name: Diones Coelho da Costa
- Date of birth: 21 June 1985 (age 41)
- Place of birth: Timbiras, Brazil
- Height: 1.78 m (5 ft 10 in)
- Position: Midfielder

Team information
- Current team: Bahia de Feira

Senior career*
Years	Team	Apps	(Gls)
2005–2008	Maranhão		
2007	→ CRB (loan)		
2008	CRB		
2009	Ferroviário		
2009	Hercílio Luz		
2010–2012	Bahia de Feira		
2010	→ Sampaio Corrêa (loan)	9	(0)
2011–2012	→ Bahia (loan)	52	(1)
2013–2014	Bahia	19	(1)
2014	→ Chapecoense (loan)	21	(2)
2015	Sampaio Corrêa	34	(5)
2016	Joinville	8	(0)
2017	Ceará	1	(0)
2017	Boa Esporte	29	(4)
2018	Botafogo-SP	0	(0)
2018	Juventude	24	(1)
2019	Botafogo-SP	0	(0)
2019	Sampaio Corrêa	11	(0)
2019	Parauapebas		
2020–	Bahia de Feira	0	(0)
- * Club domestic league appearances and goals as of 22:21, 18 March 2020 (UTC)

Diones Coelho da Costa (born 21 June 1985), known as Diones, is a Brazilian footballer who plays as midfielder for Associação Desportiva Bahia de Feira.

== Career statistics ==
As of 27 March 2017

Club	Season	League			State League		Cup		Continental		Other		Total	
Club	Season	Division	Apps	Goals	Apps	Goals	Apps	Goals	Apps	Goals	Apps	Goals	Apps	Goals
Bahia de Feira	2010	Baiano	—		19	0	—		—		—		19	0
Bahia de Feira	2011	Baiano	—		20	3	—		—		—		20	3
Bahia de Feira	Subtotal		—		39	3	—		—		—		39	3
Sampaio Corrêa	2010	Série D	9	0	—		—		—		—		9	0
Bahia	2011	Série A	18	1	—		—		—		—		18	1
Bahia	2012	Série A	34	0	14	1	5	1	2	0	—		55	2
Bahia	2013	Série A	19	1	10	0	2	1	3	0	4 (Note: All appearance(s) in Copa do Nordeste)	1	38	3
Bahia	Subtotal		71	2	24	1	7	2	5	0	4	1	111	6
Chapecoense	2014	Série A	21	2	11	0	1	0	—		—		33	2
Sampaio Corrêa	2015	Série B	34	5	6	0	3	2	—		—		43	7
Joinville	2016	Série B	8	0	12	1	4	0	—		—		24	1
Ceará	2017	Série B	—		4	0	0	0	—		1 (Note: All appearance(s) in Primeira Liga)	0	5	0
Career total			143	9	96	5	15	4	5	0	5	1	264	19
