= Suzano Maranhão Thermal Power Plant =

Thermoelectric plant in Maranhão, Brazil

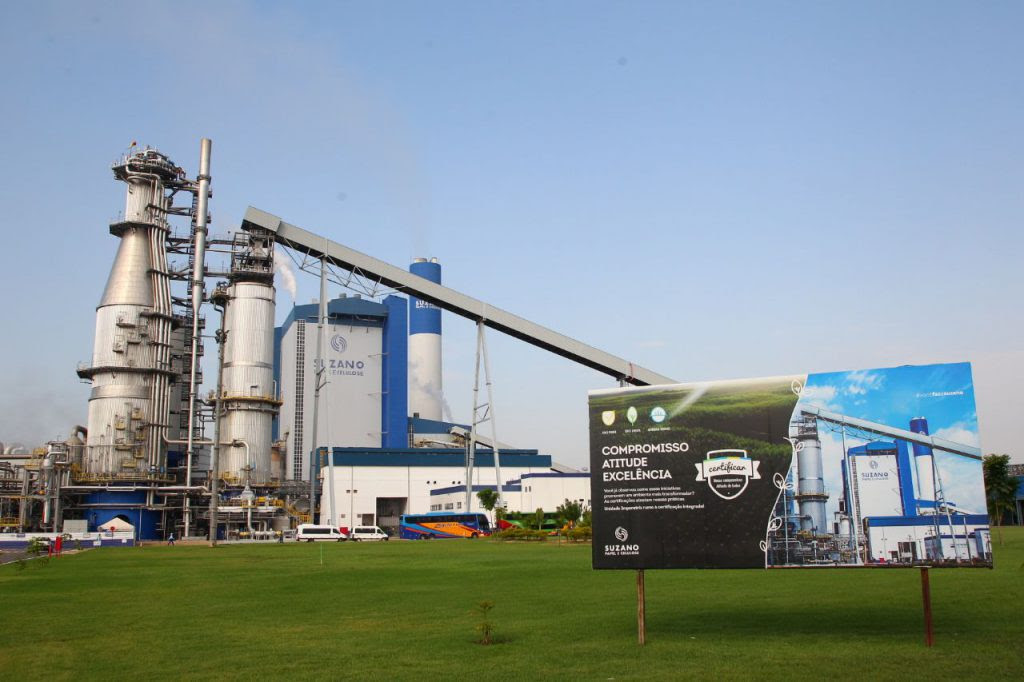
- Suzano Maranhão Thermal Power Plant in Imperatriz
- Location of the Suzano Maranhão Thermal Power Plant
- Country: Brazil
- Location: Imperatriz, Maranhão
- Coordinates: 05°25′00″S 47°33′55″W
- Owner: Suzano Papel e Celulose

Power generation
- Nameplate capacity: 254.84 MW

The Suzano Maranhão Thermal Power Plant (Portuguese: Usina Termelétrica Suzano Maranhão) is a biomass-fired power station inaugurated in April 2014 and located in the city of Imperatriz, in Maranhão, Brazil. It supplies energy to the Suzano Papel e Celulose factory in Imperatriz, which has an annual production capacity of 1.65 million tons of pulp.

== Structure ==
The planting of eucalyptus in the south of Maranhão, Pará and Tocantins, as well as the transportation of production through the Itaqui Port in São Luís via the North-South, Carajás and Transnordestina railroads, allowed for the installation of a thermal power station in Imperatriz.

The Suzano Papel e Celulose also built a 28-kilometre railroad branch line that runs from inside the thermal power station to the North-South railroad. There was an industrial investment estimated at US$2.4 billion, in addition to US$575 million allocated to the development of the forestry base.

== Energy capacity ==
The Suzano Maranhão Thermal Power Plant is capable of producing 254.84 MW when operating on a self-production basis. It can provide electricity for its own use and supply the chemical plant for the production of sodium chlorate, chlorine dioxide, and oxygen. The surplus of 100 MW is exported to the National Interconnected System. As fuel, the power plant uses the black liquor obtained in the pulp manufacturing process and forestry waste.

== See also ==
- Suzano Papel e Celulose
- Ponta da Madeira
- Parnaíba Thermal Power Complex
