= Açailândia =

- Municipality
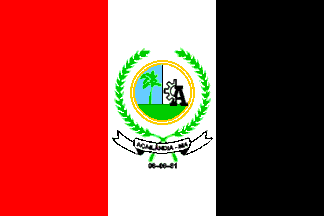
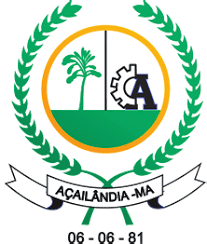
- Flag Coat of arms

- Location in Maranhão state

- Location in Brazil
- Coordinates: 4°56′49″S 47°30′18″W
- Country: Brazil
- Region: Northeast
- State: Maranhão

Population (2022 Census)
  - Total: 106,550
  - Estimate (2025): 110,611
- Time zone: UTC−3 (BRT)
- Website: www.acailandia.ma.gov.br

Açailândia (Portuguese pronunciation: [asa.iˈlɐ̃dʒiɐ]) is a Brazilian municipality in the western part of Maranhão State, at an elevation of 787 feet (240 m). Its population in 2022 Census was estimated to be 106,550, making it the eighth largest city in the state. The name of the city means "land of the açaí."

The city is an important center of agribusiness, the area having the largest cattle stock in Maranhão. The production of pig iron is the municipality's biggest single economic activity. Açailândia is part of the Carajas Development Corridor and the city houses many of the workers who produce charcoal in the area. The city has one of the most important railway stations on the Carajás Railway line.

Açailândia's origins are recent, lying in the construction of the Belém-Brasília highway in 1958, when the fertile lands in the vicinity of the Açailândia Creek came to the attention of those engaged in building the highway. For some time, Açailândia was considered a district of the city of Imperatriz, the second largest city in the state of Maranhão.
