= Bacanga State Park =

State park in Maranhão, Brazil

- Parque Estadual do Bacanga
- IUCN category II (national park)
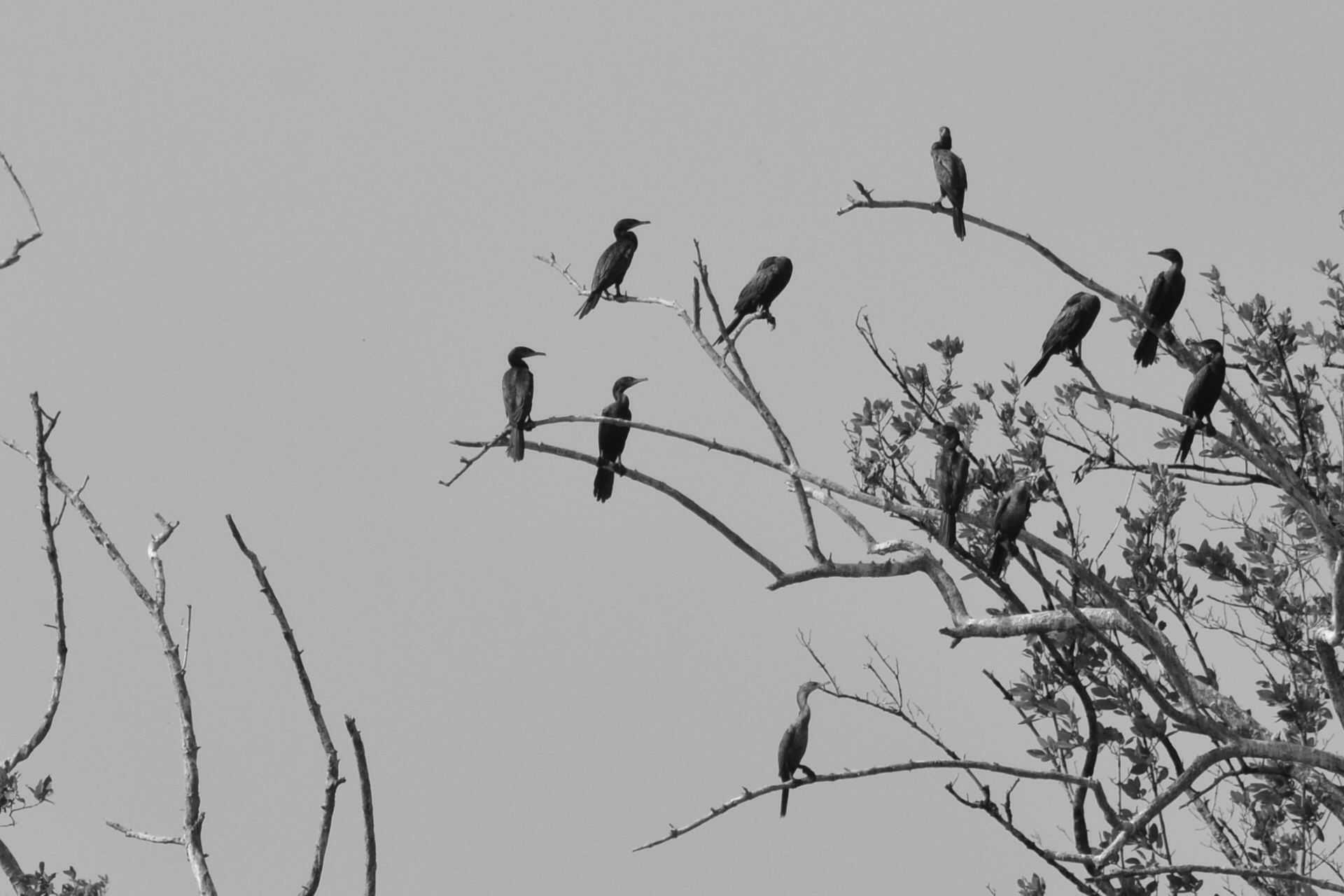
- A tree on the Rio Bacanga

- Location within Brazil
- Nearest city: São Luís, Maranhão
- Coordinates: 2.591775°S 44.273732°W
- Area: 2,634 hectares (6,510 acres)
- Designation: State park
- Created: 7 March 1980
- Administrator: Secretaria de Estado de Meio Ambiente e Recursos Naturais

The Bacanga State Park (Portuguese: Parque Estadual do Bacanga) is a state park in the state of Maranhão, Brazil. It protects the main water supply for the city of São Luís, the Batatã reservoir. The park's environment has been badly degraded through illegal occupation, logging, removal of sand, and garbage dumping. The water supply is threatened.

== Location ==
The Bacanga State Park is the São Luís municipality of Maranhão. It has an area of 2,634 hectares (6,510 acres). It is just south of the city of São Luís, and north of the Região de Maracanã Environmental Protection Area, on the right bank of the Bacanga River. It lies between residential zones with high demographic pressure and the industrial district. The area surrounding the park had a population of 18,240 in 1991 and 60,564 in 2001. There is no buffer zone to prevent environmental damage around the park.

The park contains the ruins of the Sítio do Físico industrial complex, about 1,600 square metres (17,000 sq ft) of ruined tanneries, furnaces, tanks and warehouses. The Sítio do Físico was one of the main industrial complexes of Maranhão in the early 19th century. The extensive mangrove forests nearby provided the tannin used to tan leather. The Brazilian Institute of Cultural Heritage (IBPC) is involved in preserving the Sítio do Físico.

Eletronorte electrical transmission lines cross the park from north to south. The Batatã water reservoir is in the east of the park, to the west of the Marechal Cunha Machado International Airport. The reservoir provides the main water supply for the city of São Luís and for 30% of São Luís Island.

== History ==
For centuries the state of Maranhão has followed a policy of extracting resources to supply the metropolis. In recent years living standards have fallen, in part due to uncontrolled use of natural resources. The area occupied by the park suffered from the uncontrolled growth of the city of São Luís, with damage including fires, extraction of timber and sand, garbage accumulation and so on.

The Bacanga State Park was created by decree 7.545 of 7 March 1980 to conserve natural environments favorable to the development of scientific, educational and recreational activities, with an area of about 3,075 hectares (7,600 acres). The park was made the joint responsibility of the Secretariat of State for Natural Resources, Technology and Environment (SERNAT) and the water authority (CAEMA), who operates the reservoir. Decree 7545 stated that the park's limits could be redefined to exclude areas that were irreversibly occupied or used, as long as this did not affect the characteristics of the park.

On 24 April 1984 the area of the park was redefined to cover about 2,971 hectares (7,340 acres). The reduction recognised that some areas had in fact been occupied and housing had been built. The park management plan was prepared in 1998 and updated in 2001. On 14 December 2001 another 331 hectares (820 acres) of occupied land was excluded.

== Environment ==
The park has poor laterite soil that is vulnerable to fires, deforestation, and erosion. The climate is hot and humid. It is in a flat, coastal area affected by tides, with mangroves. There are small hills and valleys in the centre of the park. The park preserves a remnant of Amazon rainforest whose natural springs feed the Batatã Dam. The park also provides an essential environmental service in recharging the aquifers below the city.

== Threats ==
Maintenance activity on the electrical lines impacts the environment. In 2001 there were small settlements with a total of 747 inhabitants within the park, felling trees, burning the vegetation and practising a primitive form of agriculture. The responsible agencies, SEMA and CAEMA, were doing little to manage the situation, allowing informal occupation and construction in the park, deforestation, degradation of ravines and gullies and so on.

In 1995 satellite images showed that forest coverage was high forest 30.97%, low forest 25.90%, mangroves 17.37% and riparian forest 11.46%. Forest covered more than 85% of the ground, while land used for agriculture, bare earth and buildings covered just over 9%. In 2004 forest covered 80.61% of the area and disturbed land 16.1%. Mangrove forest had been reduced from 17.37% to 10.82%, and high forest from 30.97% to 22.60%, while low forest had risen from 25.90% to 35.49%. Deforestation had been caused by harvesting of timber for construction of houses and for firewood, and by removal of vegetation to allow stone and clay to be excavated for local sale.

Between 1995 and 2004 the area covered by surface water, mostly in the reservoir, decreased from 4.33% to 3.27%. The reservoir was projected to continue shrinking, with the land around it used for construction. In 2003 the reservoir was almost empty in dry periods.

== Sources ==
- Ediléa Dutra Pereira (16 March 2010), Parque Estadual do Bacanga: os desafios para sua conserva (in Portuguese), Universidade Federal do Maranhão
- PES do Bacanga (in Portuguese), ISA: Instituto Socioambiental
- Pinheiro, José de Ribamar Júnior; Costa, Lizit Alencar da; Vaz dos Santos, Márcio Costa Fernandes; Gom, Lenisa Nina (April 2007), Análise temporal da paisagem do Parque Estadual do Bacanga utilizando Imagens dos Satélites SPOT-3 e CBERS-2 (PDF) (in Portuguese), INPE
- "São Luís: Parque Estadual do Bacanga em debate", Portal Vermelho (in Portuguese), 15 March 2010
- Soares Teixeira, Maria do Perpetuo Socorro; Soares Teixeira, Antonia Maria (12 June 2008), A preservação do Parque Estadual do Bacanga a partir de uma proposta didático-pedagógica (PDF) (in Portuguese), archived from the original (PDF) on 28 January 2015
