= Sítio Rangedor State Park =

State park in Maranhão, Brazil

- Parque Estadual do Sítio do Rangedor
- IUCN category II (national park)
- Location within Brazil
- Nearest city: São Luís, Maranhão
- Coordinates: 2°29′49″S 44°16′05″W
- Area: 126 hectares (310 acres)
- Designation: State park
- Created: 2005

The Sítio Rangedor State Park (Portuguese: Parque Estadual do Sítio do Rangedor) is a state park in the state of Maranhão, Brazil. It is located in the centre of São Luís, the state capital, and contains the state's Legislative Assembly and other public buildings.

== Background ==
The conservation unit is in the Calhau bairro of São Luís, the state capital. It is located in the Sítio Santa Eulália and Sítio Rangedor sectors of land owned by the IPEM (Instituto de Previdência do Estado do Maranhão) in a prime location of the city. In 1991 the Henrique de La Roque Palace was built there, the Administrative Centre of the State of Maranhão. The Sítio Rangedor Ecological Station was established as a fully protected area by state decree 21797 of 2005, with an initial area of 126 hectares (310 acres).

== History ==
The Legislative Assembly of the state of Maranhão was built within the Ecological Station soon after it was established. An environmental assessment report published in June 2006 stated that the construction had minimal impact on the conservation unit since it was mostly built on deforested parts of the site. Decree 23.303 of 2007 reduced the area of the unit to 121 hectares (300 acres). The government later built the Sebrae Multicenter and the Pedro Neiva de Santana Convention Center in the unit.

In February 2013 senior state politicians planted 50 seedlings of native species in the ecological station to symbolize the start of a compensation and reforestation program in Maranhão Island. About 25 hectares (62 acres) of the unit would be taken up by the program. In October 2013 it was reported that the seat of the Maranhão Institute of Industrial Metrics and Quality was to be built in the unit. In December 2015 a major fire devastated the environmental unit. The fire department would not say what caused the fire.

On 11 May 2016 the state legislative assembly approved law 321/2015 to change the unit's status and name. The Ecological Station would now be called the Sítio do Rangedor State Park. Formerly public visits were only allowed for educational purposes. Under the new classification, the unit aims to preserve the natural ecosystem of great ecological significance and scenic beauty, support scientific research and environmental education and interpretation, and to support recreation in contact with nature and ecological tourism.

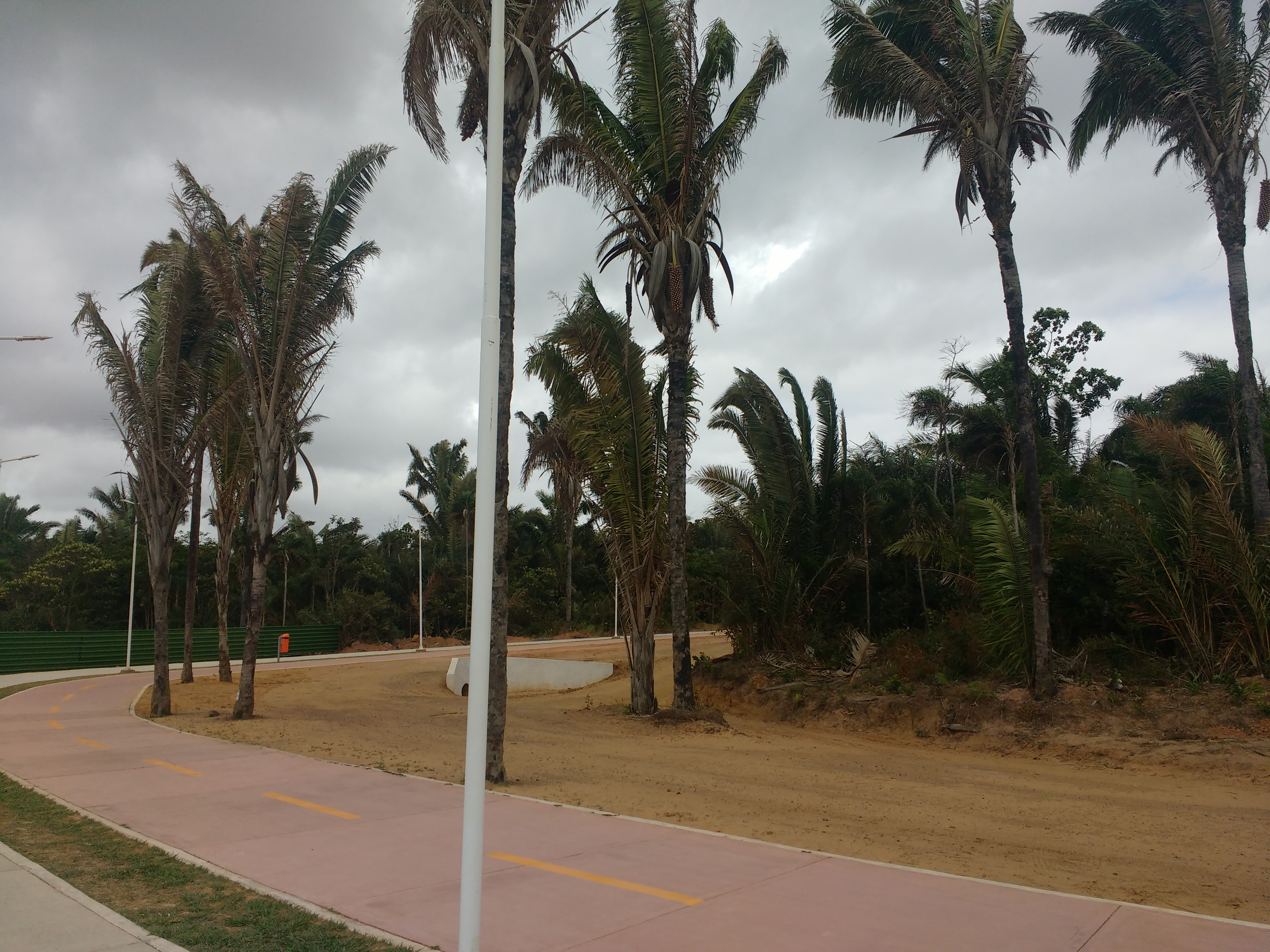
Babassu Palms and trail in Rangedor Park.

In 2017, the construction of a new space in the park began, seeking to transform it into a space for leisure, sport, and environmental preservation. The project would use an area of 7% of the park, in the region that was degraded with burning, dumping of garbage and illegal hunting. The construction of leisure areas also received criticism from environmentalists, for the importance of the site for the replacement of aquifers and guaranteeing the supply of underground water reserves.

The new park opened in September 2019, which now has eight squares with sports equipment and playgrounds. There is also a hiking trail and a 3.5 km bike path, as well as an Environmental Police and a food truck village, as well as parking with 500 spaces. Other existing squares are the ones of: of the Love, Murici, Ouriços, Tiracambú and Pajeú.

Sítio do Rangedor State Park covers an area of 120 ha, remnant of the Amazon biome (pre-Amazon or Eastern Amazon), original environment of Upaon-açu Island. The topographic highlight in relation to the adjacent areas, such as sedimentary rocks that originate the permeable soils and vegetation, the favorable environment for the infiltration of rainfall.

== Biodiversity ==
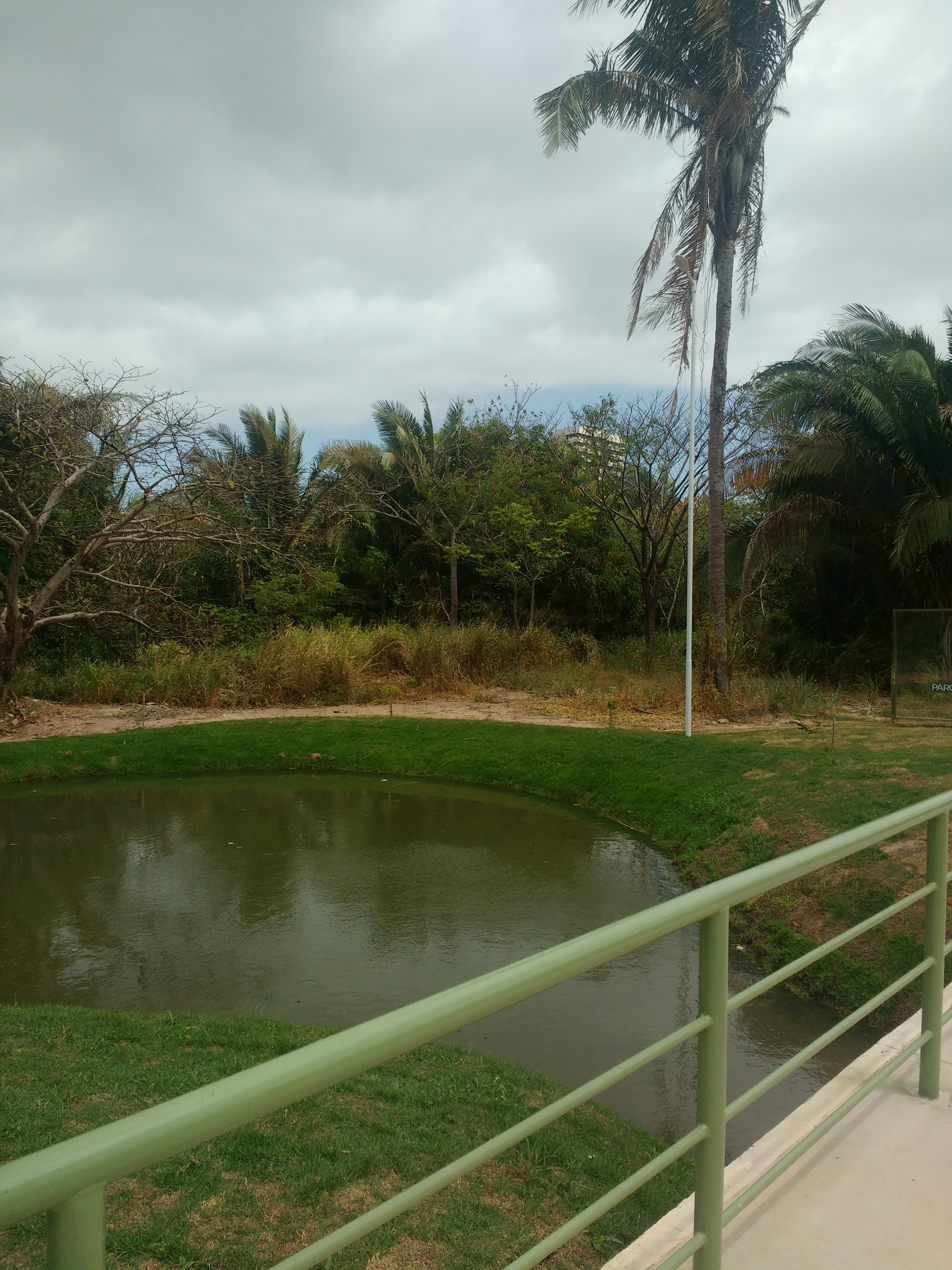
Pond inside the park

Sítio do Rangedor State Park covers an area of 120 ha, remnant of the Amazon biome (pre-Amazon or Eastern Amazon), original environment of Upaon-açu Island. The topographic highlight in relation to the adjacent areas, such as sedimentary rocks that originate the permeable soils and vegetation, the favorable environment for the infiltration of rainfall.

These attributes, added to its condition of public area with extension in the densely populated urban environment, make the park a favorable area for recharge of an aquifer, besides influencing the maintenance of microclimates of the region, the salinity of the nearby rivers, being preserved and of native animals. Therefore, its contribution to the environmental quality of São Luís Island is undeniable.

In the fauna found in Rangedor, there are capijuba monkeys, capuchin monkeys, anteaters, armadillos, carcarás, hawks, alligators, various types of birds, such as jacana and jandaia. The local flora features many palm trees such as babassu, coconut, tucum, buriti, juçara, anajá; mango, murici, cashew, saputi, banana trees, embaúba, chestnut trees, jatobá, bamboo, castor.

== Sources ==
- Aurina Carneiro (11 May 2016), Plenário aprova projeto que altera Estação Ecológica do Sítio do Rangedor (in Portuguese), Agência Assembleia
- Conceição, Frazão; Furtado, Cutrim; Carvalho, Viana de; Costa, Silva (14–18 October 2013), Estudo da Qualidade da Água do Aquífero do Rangedor em uma Unidade de Conservação de Proteção Integral, em São Luís – (MA), Rio de Janeiro: 53º Congresso Brasileiro de Quimica, ISBN 978-85-85905-06-4
- Domingos Costa (24 October 2013), Intenção de Roseana é acabar de vez com Reserva Ecológica Sítio do Rangedor (in Portuguese)
- "Estação Ecológica do Rangedor", Wikimapia (in Portuguese)
- "Incêndio devasta estação ecológica do Sítio Rangedor no Maranhão", globo.com (in Portuguese), Globo Comunicação e Participações S.A., 1 December 2015
- Martin Varão (24 October 2013), MARANHÃO NATUREZA: COM MAIS UMA OBRA IRREGULAR NO RANGEDOR, GOVERNO ROSEANA SARNEY DECRETA O FIM DA ESTAÇÃO ECOLÓGICA (in Portuguese)
- Soares Coelho, Ana Gissele (4–7 October 2010), PARA QUE SERVE A LEGISLAÇÃO AMBIENTAL: um estudo de caso da Estação Ecológica do Rangedor na cidade de São Luis- MA (PDF) (in Portuguese), Florianópolis – SC – Brasil
- Waldemar Ter (5 February 2013), COMEÇA PELA ESTAÇÃO ECOLÓGICA DO SÍTIO RANGEDOR O INÍCIO DO PROGRAMA DE COMPENSAÇÃO E REPOSIÇÃO FLORESTAL NA GRANDE ILHA (in Portuguese)
