= Manoel Beckman =

Brazilian businessman (1630–1685)

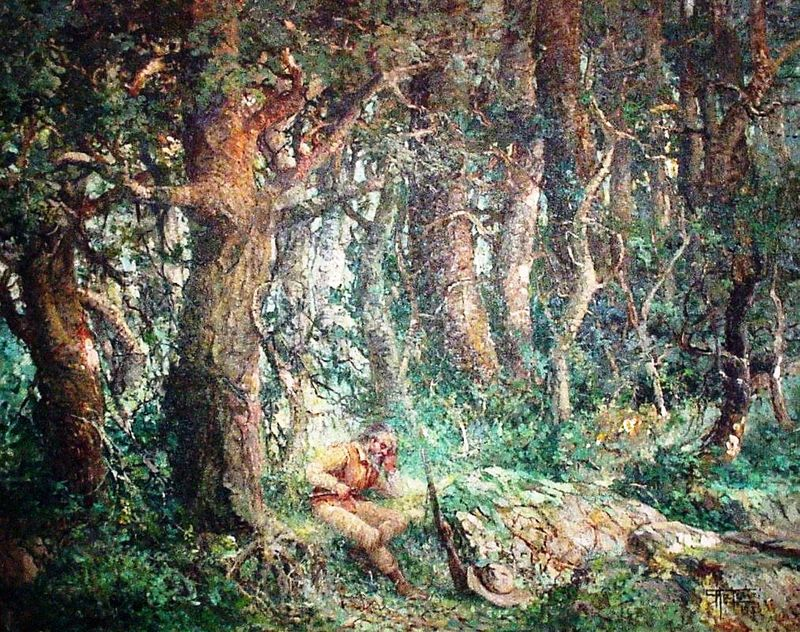
- Beckmann by Antônio Parreiras, 1936
- Born: 1630
- Died: 2 November 1685 (aged 54–55)
- Occupations: Trader; Politician

Manoel Beckman[n] (c. 1630 – 2 November 1685), also known as Bequimão, was a 17th-century trader, politician and farmer in São Luís, Maranhão, in the northeast of Brazil. He was son of a German father and a Portuguese mother, both of Jewish origin. He was investigated by the Portuguese Inquisition. In 1684, together with his brother Tomás and many rich farmers, he started a rebellion against the local colonial authorities and the Company of Commerce because of unfulfilled promises of shipments of African slaves and the abolition of native slavery. He also targeted the Catholic clergy, especially the Crown's Favourites, who protected the Christian natives. The insurrection was eventually put down by Loyalist troops and Beckman was hanged on 2 November 1685.
