= São Luís, Maranhão =

Capital city of Maranhão, Brazil

São Luís
- Municipality
- Municipality of São Luís
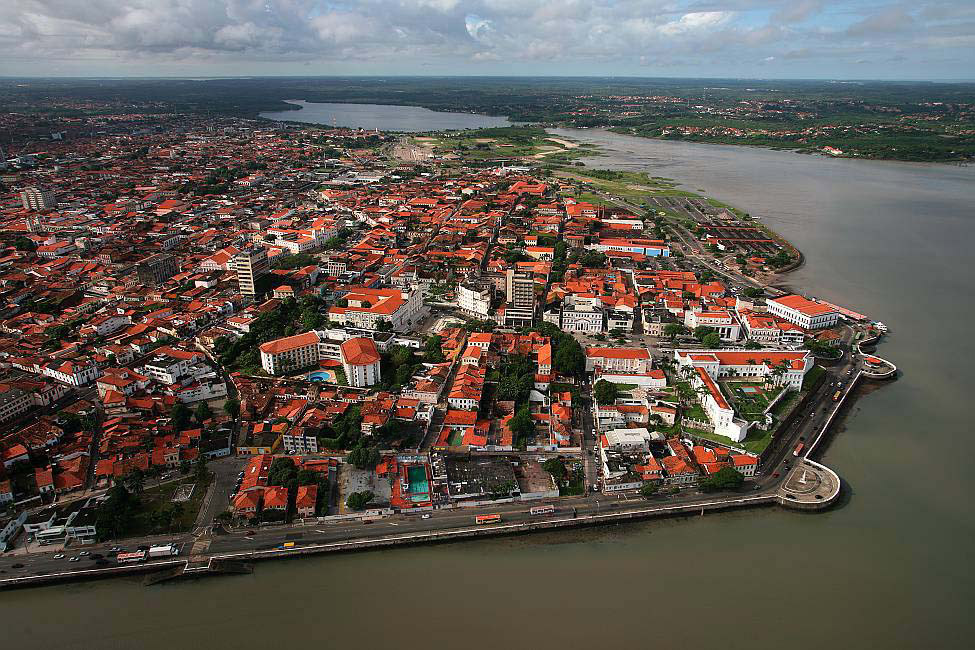
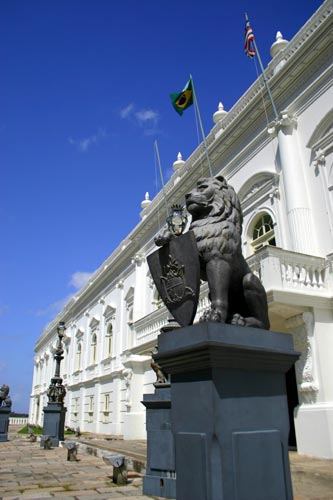
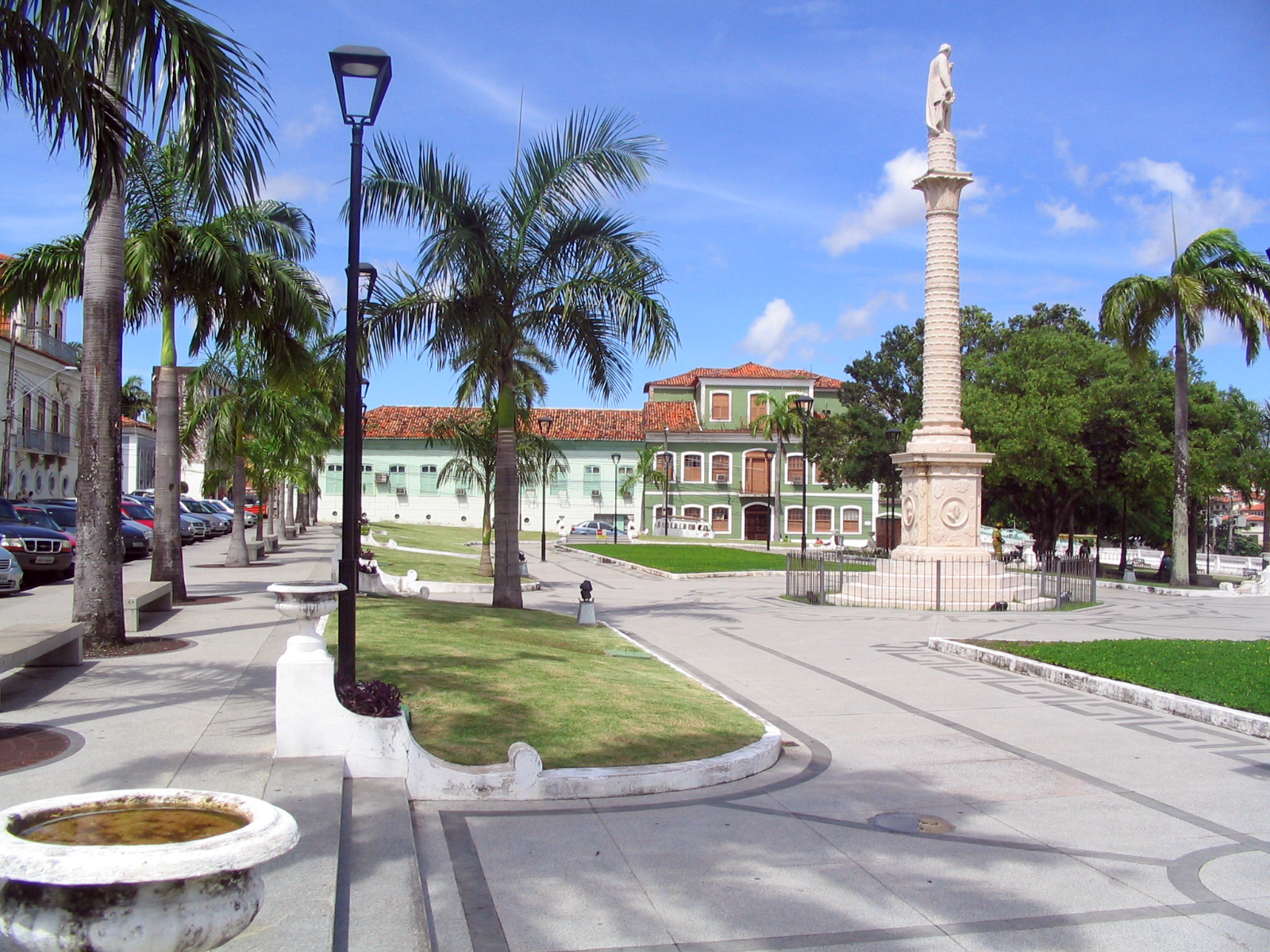
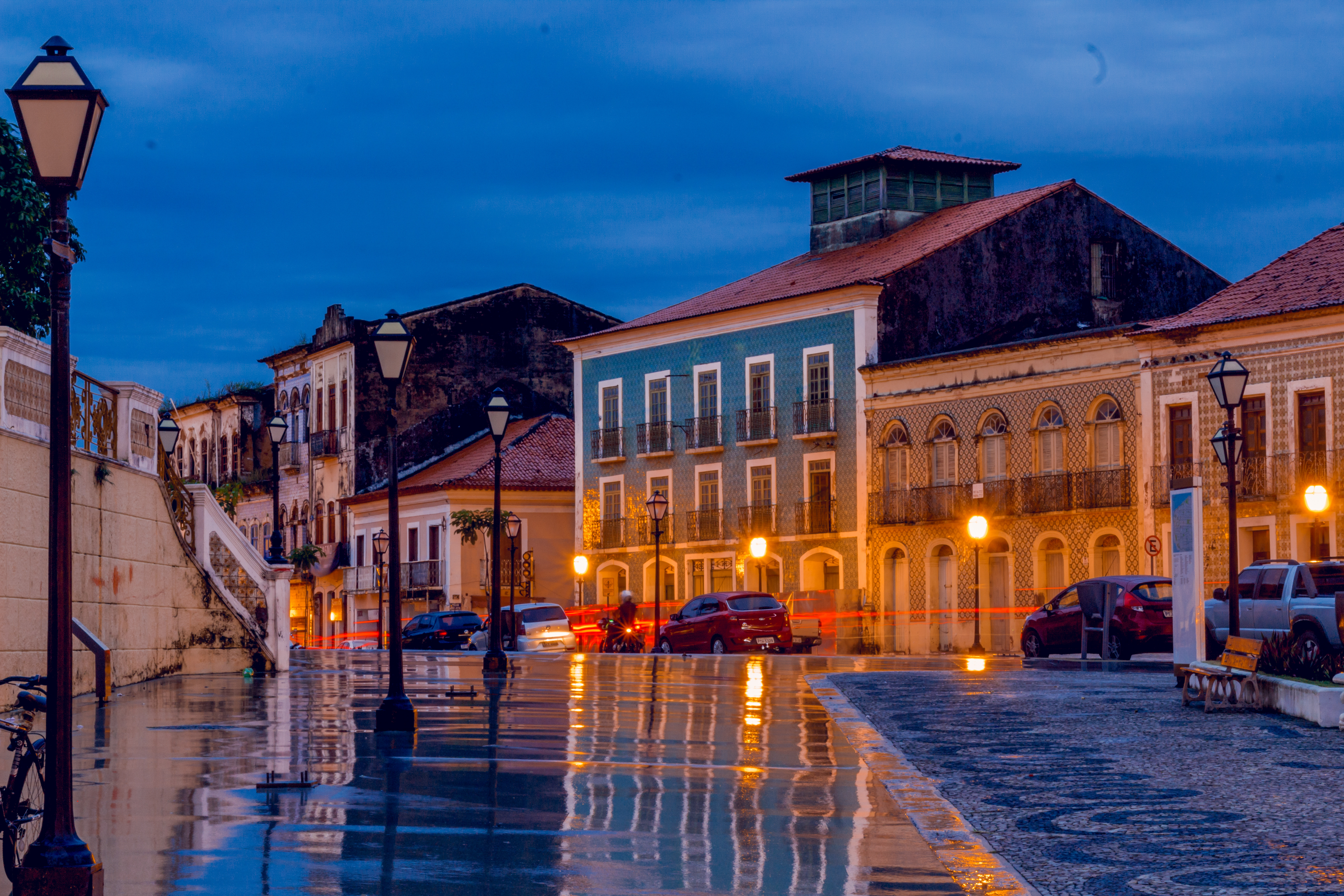
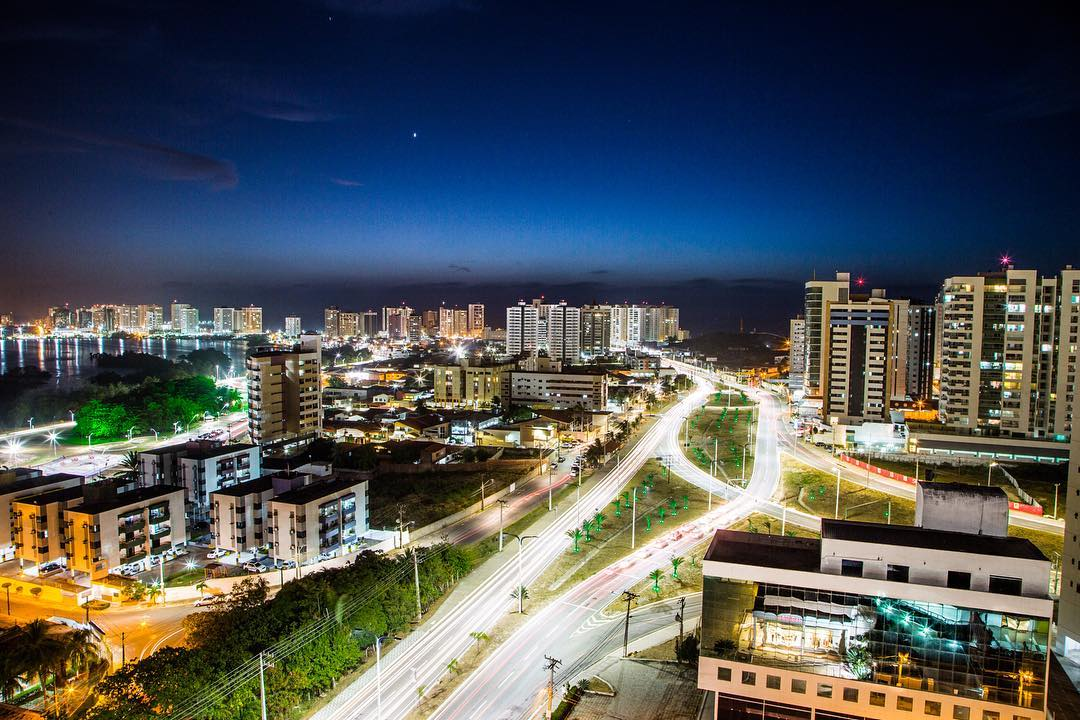
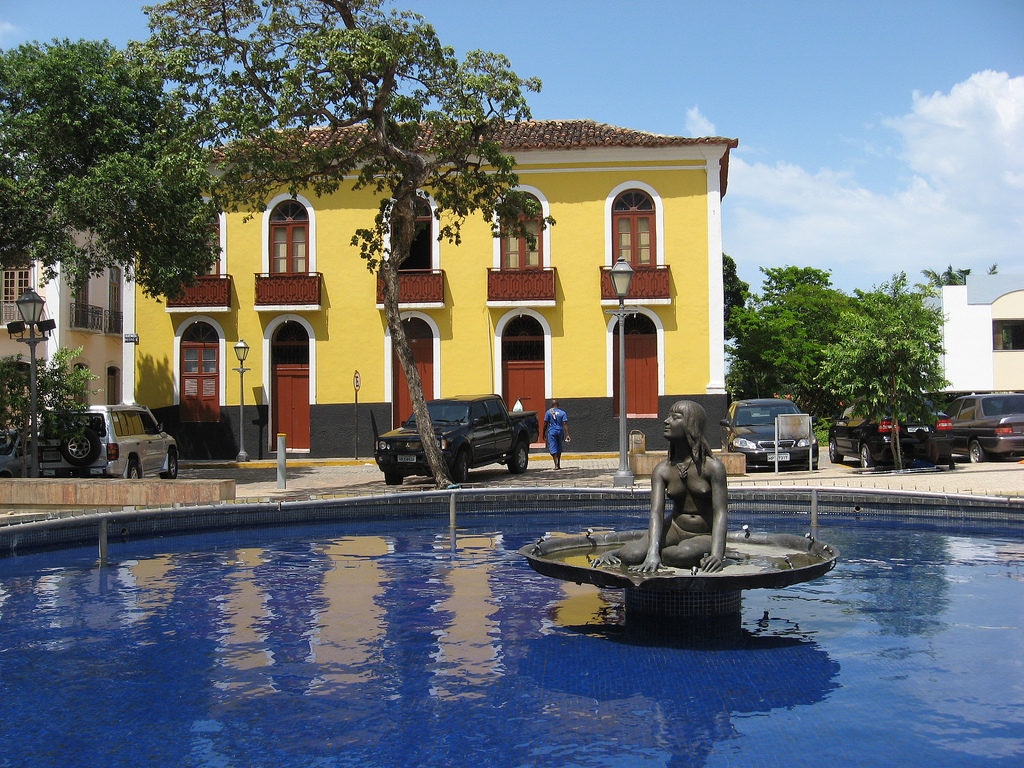
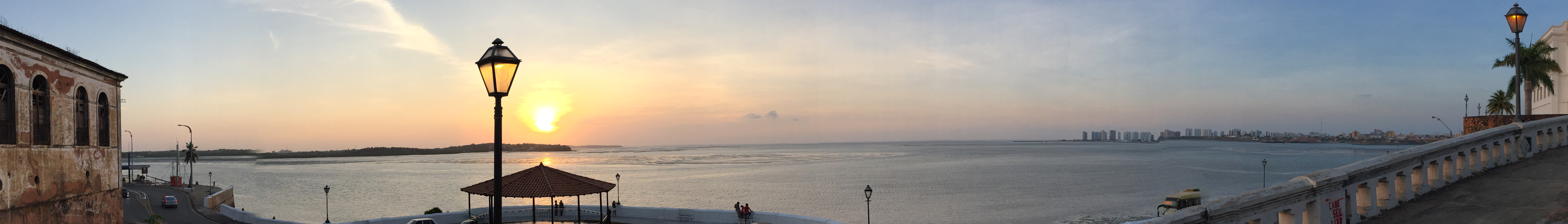
- Aerial view, Leoes Palace, Cristo Rei Palace, Historical center, Ponta do Farol at night, Fountain in Pedro II Square and view of São Marcos Bay.

- Flag Coat of arms
- Nicknames: Cidade dos Azulejos ("City of Tiles"), Jamaica Brasileira ("Brazilian Jamaica"), Ilha do Amor ("Love Island"), Ilha Magnética ("Magnetic Island")...
- Location of São Luís

- Location in Brazil
- Coordinates: 2°31′42″S 44°18′16″W
- Country: Brazil
- Region: Northeast
- State: Maranhão
- Founded: September 8, 1612
- Named for: Saint Louis IX

Government
  - Mayor: Esmênia Miranda (PSD)

Area
  - Municipality: 827.141 km^{2} (319.361 sq mi)
- Elevation: 4 m (13 ft)

Population (2025)
  - Municipality: 1,089,215 (13th)
  - Density: 1,183.4/km^{2} (3,064.9/sq mi)
  - Metro: 1,536,017
- Demonym: são-luisense or ludovicense (Portuguese)
- Time zone: UTC-3 (UTC-3)
- Postal Code: 65000-001 to 65109-999
- Area code: +55 98
- HDI (2010): 0.768 – high
- Website: www.saoluis.ma.gov.br

São Luís (/saʊn ˈlwiːs/; Brazilian Portuguese: [ˌsɐ̃w̃ luˈis]; "Saint Louis") is the capital and largest city of the Brazilian state of Maranhão. The city is located on São Luís Island, in the Baía de São Marcos (Saint Mark's Bay), an extension of the Atlantic Ocean which forms the estuary of Pindaré, Mearim, Itapecuru and other rivers. Its coordinates are 2.53° south, 44.30° west. São Luís has the second largest maritime extension within Brazilian states. Its maritime extension is 640 km (397 miles). The city proper has a population of some 1,088,057 people (2024 IBGE census). The metropolitan area totals 1,536,017, ranked as the 15th largest in Brazil.

São Luís, created originally as Saint-Louis-de-Maragnan, is the only Brazilian state capital founded by France (see France Équinoxiale) and it is one of the three Brazilian state capitals located on islands (the others are Vitória and Florianópolis). The historic center of the city (dating from the 17th century) has its original street plan preserved and was named a UNESCO World Heritage Site in 1997.

The city has two major sea ports: Madeira Port and Itaqui Port, through which a substantial part of Brazil's iron ore, originating from the (pre)-Amazon region, is exported. The city's main industries are metallurgical with Alumar, and Vale. São Luís is home of the Federal University of Maranhão and Estadual University of Maranhão.

São Luís was the home town of famous Brazilian samba singer Alcione, Brazilian writers Aluísio Azevedo, Ferreira Gullar and Josué Montello, Belgian-naturalised soccer player Luís Oliveira, and the musician João do Vale, a Música popular brasileira (MPB) singer.

== History ==
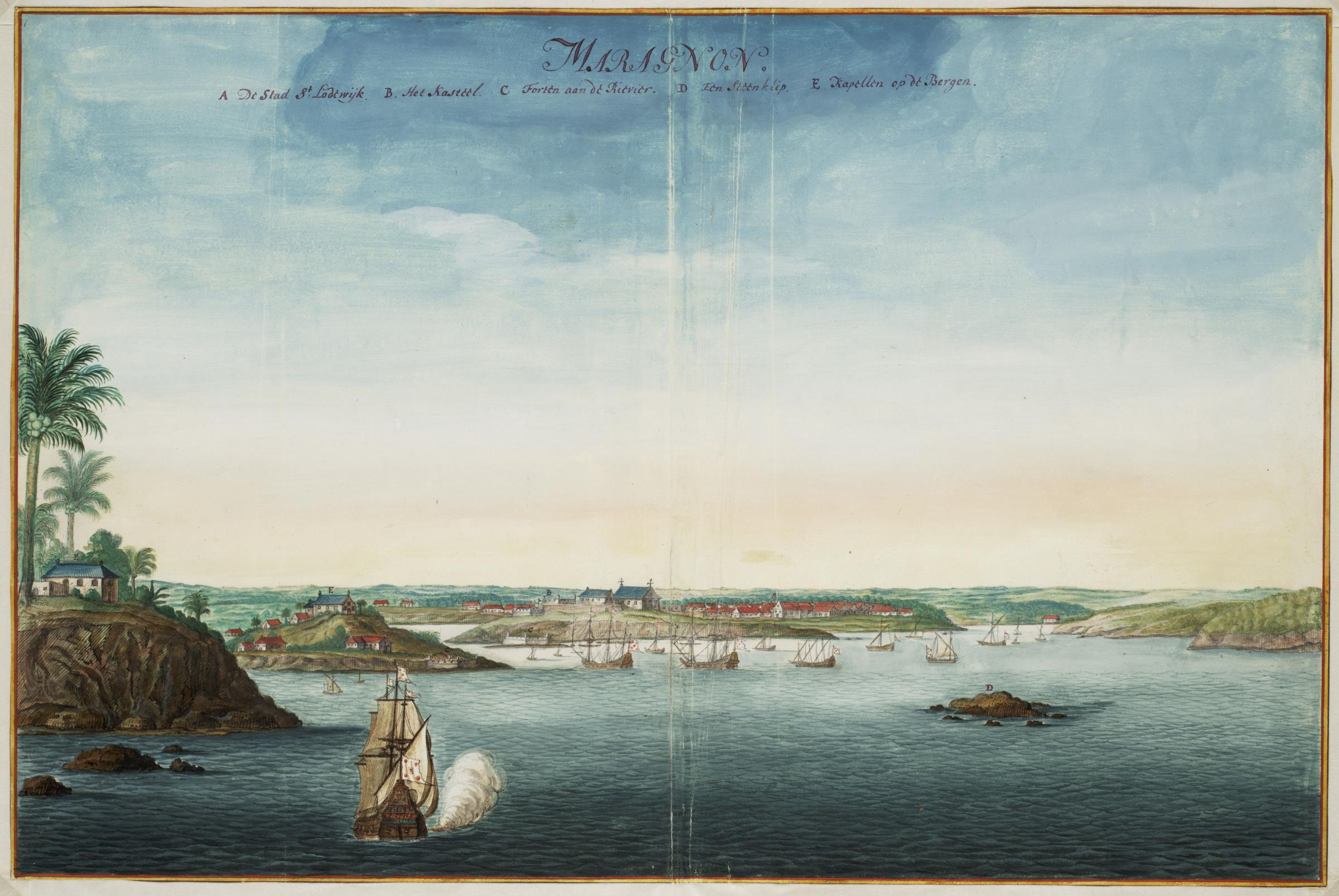
View of São Luís, c. 1665

Originally, the town was a large village of the Tupinambá tribe. The first Europeans to settle it were the French, in 1612, who intended to make it the center of a colony named Equinoctial France, under the command of Daniel de la Touche, Seigneur de la Ravardière, and Admiral François de Razilly. They built a fort named Saint-Louis de Maragnan after King Louis XIII and his Saintly ancestor Louis IX, the construction of which marked the date of foundation of the city, September 8. Portugal conquered the settlement in 1615 in the battle of Guaxenduba and renamed the city São Luís.

Because there had been little time for the French to build a city, there is some controversy as to the actual date of the founding of the city, whether by the French or the Portuguese.

Panoramic view of São Luís in 1931

São Luís was invaded and occupied by the Dutch on November 1641 as part of the wider Dutch invasion of Brazil. A force of 1,000 troops under Jan Cornelisz Lichthart (died 1646), an admiral of the Dutch West India Company, arrived in the city. The Dutch pillaged the city, notably Catholic imagery and structures. Fighting in the cities continued for 27 months. The Dutch surrendered to José Constantino Gomes de Castro and abandoned Maranhão on February 28, 1644.

In 1677, the city was made the seat of the new Roman Catholic Diocese of São Luís do Maranhão.

Only when those invasions ceased permanently did the colonial government decide to create the state of Grão-Pará e Maranhão, independent from the rest of the country. By that time, the economy was based on agriculture, particularly the exportation of sugar cane, cacao and tobacco. Conflicts amongst the local elites would lead to the Beckman's Revolt. This started due to the struggle between Jesuits and landowners, the first against the Indian slavery and the others against the unfair treatment given by the Portuguese authorities; the situation lead to an uprising against the Portuguese, led by the brothers Manoel and Tomás Beckman and lasted till the intervention of Portuguese troops under the command of the general Gomes Freire de Andrade. After few skirmishes, the rebels were defeated and the Beckman brothers arrested and, after a brief trial, were hanged, drawn and quartered. The last words of Manoel Beckman at the gallows were "Pelo Povo do Maranhão morro contente" ("By the Maranhão people I die happy"). The phrase decorates the main hall of State Council Building.

Soon after the outbreak of the American Civil War, the region started to provide cotton to Great Britain. The wealth generated by this activity was used to modernize the city; to bring religious men to come and teach in its schools; and supplement the water supply. The city came to be the third most populous city in the country. By the end of the 19th century, agriculture was in decay and since then the city's population has been searching for other ways to make a living.

Nowadays, São Luís has the largest preserved heritage of colonial Portuguese architecture of all Latin America. The island is known as the "Island of Love" and "the Brazilian Athens", due to its many poets and writers, such as Sotero dos Reis, Aluísio Azevedo, Graça Aranha, Gonçalves Dias, Josué Montello, Ferreira Gullar, among others. The city is also known as "the Brazilian Jamaica" because of the popularity of Reggae Music.

The ancestral composition of São Luís, according to an autosomal DNA study, is 42% European, 39% Native American and 19% African.

== Economy ==
Until the mid-nineteenth century, Maranhão's economy was one of the most prosperous in the country. However, after the Civil War in the United States of America, when it lost space in the export of cotton, the state went into decline. Only after the end of the 1960s did the state begin to receive incentives and emerge from seclusion, by way of road and rail connections with other regions.

In the late eighteenth century, increased international demand for cotton to meet the English textile industry coupled with reduced production because of the Revolutionary War in the United States provided the perfect setting to stimulate cotton production in Maranhão. Shipping companies and Southampton & Company Maranha Maranha Shipping Company, shipping steam, which performed the transportation of cotton from the states of Georgia and Alabama, began operating in St. Louis shaft - London, leading to production of Caxias and Baixada Maranhão. By the early twentieth century, St. Louis still exporting cotton to England by sea, through the lines and Booth Red Cross Line Line (the extended route to Iquitos) and company-Maranha Liverpool Shipping Company.

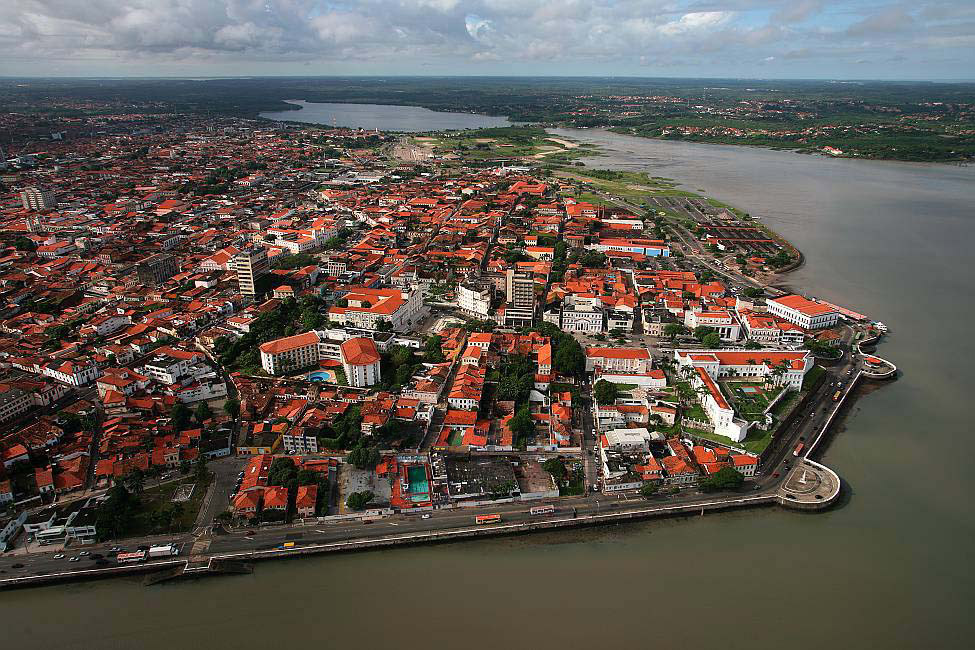
Aerial view of São Luís Central District.

During this golden period of the Maranhão economy São Luís had a lively cultural effervescence. The city had more in common with the European capitals than the other Brazilian cities. It was the first to receive an Italian opera and received the latest news about French literature every week. The rich cotton producers and local businessmen sent their children to study in Recife, Salvador, Rio de Janeiro and as far as Europe.

The opening of the Port of Alumar, Port of Itaqui and Port of Ponta da Madeira, currently the second deepest in the world, second only to the Rotterdam, is one of the busiest in the country. It serves as a gateway for industrial production and iron ore arriving from the Carajás Railway, operated by Companhia Vale do Rio Doce and also exports soybeans grown in southern Maranhão and central Brazil, transported by the Carajás Railway and North-South Railway. The port's proximity to strategic markets in Europe and North America has led it to become an attractive option for exporting goods, but suffers from increased coastal shipping.

The São Luís economy is based on aluminum processing (ALUMAR), pelleting industry (VALE), food production and tourism. São Luís has the largest GDP in the state, hosting two public universities (and UFMA UEMA) and various educational institutions and private colleges. According to the latest data from the IBGE survey, São Luís has a GDP of R$9,340,944,000.00, occupying 14th position amongst state capitals.

In neighbouring Alcântara there is the Alcântara Space Center.

== Geography ==
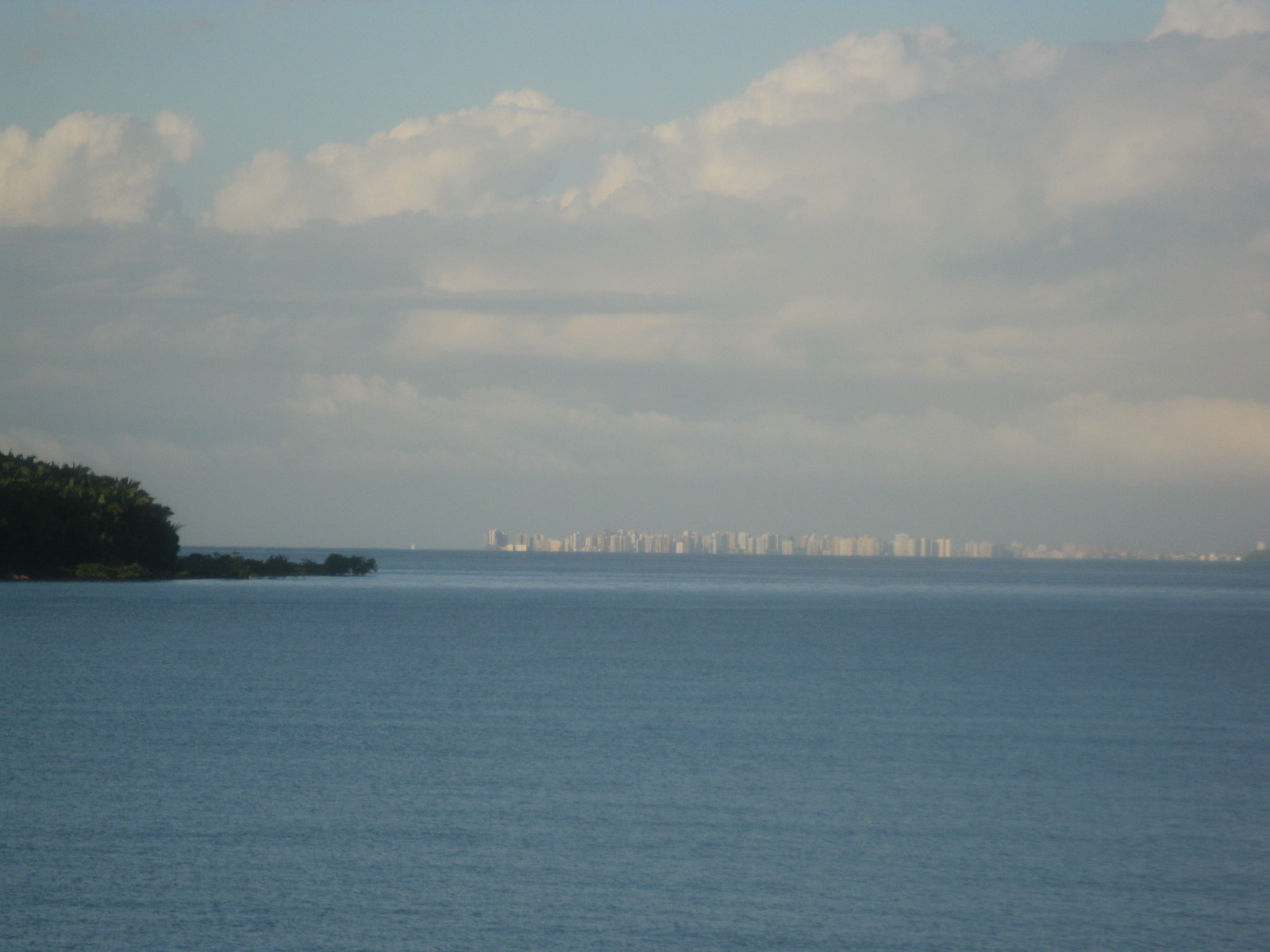
View of São Marcos bay area

The island of Upaon-Açu is located between two large estuarine systems that are the bays of São Marcos on the west side and São José on the east in the central region of Golfão Maranhense. The two bays are interconnected in the southwest by the channels of the Strait of Mosquitoes and Strait of Coqueiros (separating the island of Upaon-Açu from the island of Tauá-Mirim).

In the São Marcos bay, the watershed of the Mearim river and its tributaries flows, while in the São José/Arraial bay the watersheds of the Itapecuru and Munim rivers break. In this region, the amplitude of the tides can exceed seven meters. The region presents numerous streams and tidal channels. Several agents have modeled relief such as those of climatic, hydrological and oceanographic origin, as well as intense wind, marine and fluvial activity, with vegetation characterized by remnants of the Amazonian Forest, Mangroves and Campo de Perizes, an extensive fluvial plain with predominantly herbaceous, located on the mainland.

The climate is characterized as hot, semi-humid, tropical of equatorial zone, with two distinct seasons that go from damp (January to June) to drought (July to December), with average rainfall of 2,200 mm per year. Some of the conservation units of the island are: APA das Reentrancias Maranhenses; APA of Upaon-Açu-Miritiba-Alto Preguiças, APA of Itapiracó; APA of the Maracanã Region; and the Bacanga State Parks, the Jansen Lagoon and the Rangedor.

On the Strait of Mosquitoes, there are road and railroad bridges linking the mainland to Upaon-Açu Island: the Marcelino Machado bridge, BR-135, composed of two parallel inlet and outlet bridges (456 and 454 meters in length); the metal bridge Benedito Leite, belonging to the São Luís-Teresina Railway; the duplicate bridge belonging to the Carajás Railway; the metal bridge that supports the Italuís waterway, which carries water from the river Itapecuru to the city of São Luís.

There is also a ferry service, between São Luís and Alcântara; and São Luís International Airport.

The municipality contains part of the 1,535,310-hectare (3,793,800-acre) Upaon-Açu/Miritiba/Alto Preguiças Environmental Protection Area, created in 1992. The city is home to the Sítio Rangedor State Park, formerly the fully protected Sítio Rangedor Ecological Station. The municipality also contains a small part of the Baixada Maranhense Environmental Protection Area, a 1,775,035.6-hectare (4,386,208-acre) sustainable use conservation unit created in 1991 that has been a Ramsar Site since 2000. The 2,634-hectare (6,510-acre) Bacanga State Park is just south of the city.

=== Climate ===
The city of São Luís experiences a very marginal dry-summer tropical savanna climate (Köppen climate classification: As), bordering on a tropical monsoon climate (Köppen climate classification: Am). The city possesses a short dry season from August to November. During this period when the equatorial rainband associated with the highly seasonalized positioning of the Intertropical Convergence Zone is not over the city, warm to hot temperatures and abundant equatorial sunshine prevail. Conversely, the humid, rainy wet season dominates the remaining majority of the year, with abundant cloud cover prevalent and heavy rains falling from January to June, with the heaviest rainfall and highest cloud cover from January to May. The cloudiest month of the year is March with a monthly average of 107.2 hours of bright sunshine throughout the month, while the sunniest month of the year is August with a monthly average of 260.3 hours of sunshine throughout the month. The wettest month is April with an average monthly total of 476 mm (18.74 in) of rain, while the driest month is October with an average total rainfall of 8 mm (0.31 in). On average, nearly 70 per cent of annual rainfall is recorded from February to May. Autumn (March to May) is the coldest and wettest season, while spring (September to November) is the hottest and driest season. Summer (December to February) is a little hotter than winter (June to August) but much rainier.

Climate data for São Luís (1991–2020 normals, extremes 1961–1990)
Month	Jan	Feb	Mar	Apr	May	Jun	Jul	Aug	Sep	Oct	Nov	Dec	Year
Record high °C (°F)	33.6 (92.5)	36.0 (96.8)	32.8 (91.0)	33.0 (91.4)	33.2 (91.8)	33.1 (91.6)	32.7 (90.9)	34.4 (93.9)	34.0 (93.2)	33.2 (91.8)	34.4 (93.9)	33.8 (92.8)	36.0 (96.8)
Mean daily maximum °C (°F)	31.1 (88.0)	30.6 (87.1)	30.3 (86.5)	30.6 (87.1)	31.3 (88.3)	31.5 (88.7)	31.5 (88.7)	32.0 (89.6)	32.3 (90.1)	32.5 (90.5)	33.5 (92.3)	32.2 (90.0)	31.6 (88.9)
Mean daily minimum °C (°F)	24.2 (75.6)	24.0 (75.2)	23.8 (74.8)	23.8 (74.8)	23.9 (75.0)	23.5 (74.3)	23.4 (74.1)	24.7 (76.5)	24.4 (75.9)	24.7 (76.5)	24.9 (76.8)	25.0 (77.0)	24.2 (75.5)
Record low °C (°F)	20.0 (68.0)	20.1 (68.2)	17.9 (64.2)	13.1 (55.6)	20.2 (68.4)	20.6 (69.1)	18.1 (64.6)	20.3 (68.5)	20.9 (69.6)	21.2 (70.2)	21.6 (70.9)	20.0 (68.0)	13.1 (55.6)
Average precipitation mm (inches)	235.4 (9.27)	308.0 (12.13)	452.8 (17.83)	431.4 (16.98)	312.0 (12.28)	174.3 (6.86)	110.8 (4.36)	22.5 (0.89)	2.9 (0.11)	2.8 (0.11)	9.7 (0.38)	54.5 (2.15)	2,117.1 (83.35)
Average precipitation days (≥ 1 mm)	13	17	22	22	18	13	10	3	1	0	1	4	124
Average relative humidity (%)	82.5	84.8	86.6	87.7	86.4	84.3	82.1	80.5	77.6	76.2	76.6	77.6	81.9
Average dew point °C (°F)	24.2 (75.6)	24.3 (75.7)	24.4 (75.9)	24.7 (76.5)	24.8 (76.6)	24.4 (75.9)	24.2 (75.6)	23.9 (75.0)	23.6 (74.5)	23.5 (74.3)	23.7 (74.7)	23.9 (75.0)	24.1 (75.4)
Mean monthly sunshine hours	155.9	119.2	115.3	120.2	163.5	201.6	233.3	267.5	258.3	264.2	235.1	215	2,349.1
Mean daily daylight hours	12.3	12.2	12.1	12.1	12	12	12	12	12.1	12.2	12.2	12.3	12.1
Average ultraviolet index	12	12	12	12	11	10	10	11	12	12	12	12	12
Source 1: Instituto Nacional de Meteorologia
Source 2: Weather atlas(Daylight-UV)

== Education ==
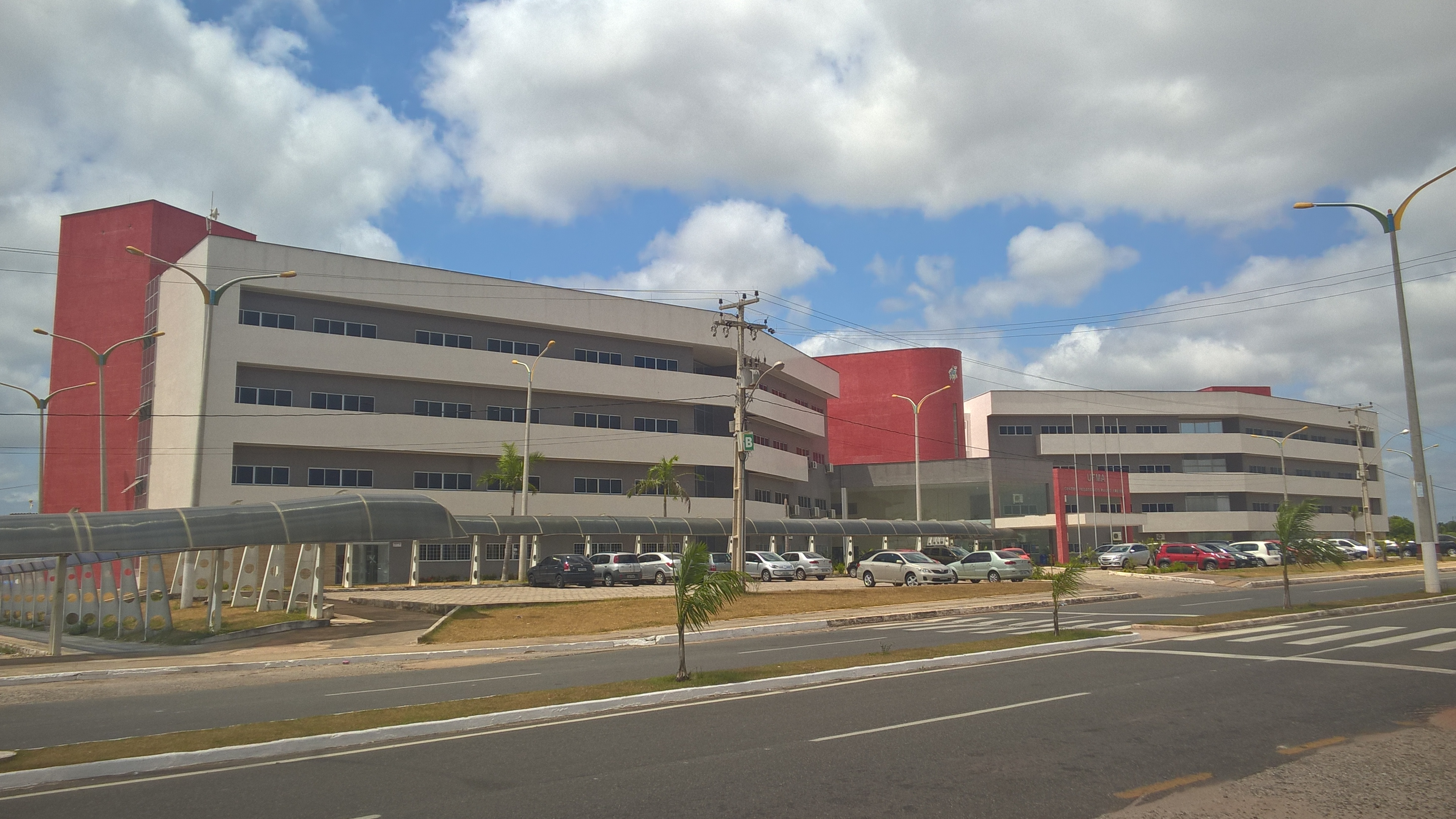
São Luís is the most important educational centre of the state.

Portuguese is the official national language, and thus the primary language taught in schools. But English and Spanish are part of the official high school curriculum.

Educational institutions include:

- Universidade Federal do Maranhão (UFMA)
- Universidade Estadual do Maranhão (UEMA)
- Faculdade Santa Terezinha (CEST)
- Universidade Ceuma (UNICEUMA)
- Instituto Estadual de Educação, Ciência e Tecnologia do Maranhão (IEMA)
- Instituto Federal de Educação, Ciência e Tecnologia do Maranhão (IFMA)
- Faculdade São Luís
- Unidade de Ensino Superior Dom Bosco (UNDB)
- Faculdade Atenas Maranhense (FAMA)
- Faculdade do Maranhão (FACAM)
- Faculdade Pitágoras

== Culture ==
São Luís is known for its tiles which most buildings in the historical centre are covered in. Because of this the city is also known as "The Tiles City" and "Brazilian Athens".

It also has some cultural peculiarities namely:

=== Tambor de Crioula ===
Tambor de Crioula is an Afro-Brazilian dance in which gaily clad women court a bateria of tambors (a row of drums). Whirling and gyrating in time to the music they negotiate for prime position in the centre of the bateria. The House of Tambor de Crioula is a museum dedicated to preserving and spreading the cultural manifestation.

=== Tambor de Mina ===
Not to be confused with the above, Tambor de Mina is the local variant of the Afro-Brazilian religion. Casa das Minas (Querebentã de Tói Zomadônu or House of Minas), the oldest temple (terreiro), which must have been founded in São Luís in the 1840s, by African women.

=== Bumba Meu Boi ===
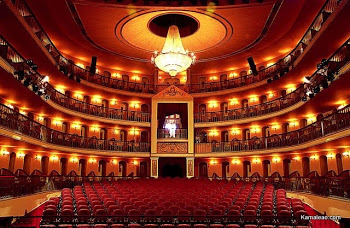
Teatro Arthur Azevedo

The Bumba Meu Boi is a popular farce which takes its form as a grand musical pantomime. Practice is a public affair and begins directly after Easter reaching its climax in June when literally hundreds of groups perform on a nightly basis for popular acclaim. Set personalities and characters play out a comedic tragedy with a metaphor for social harmony at its heart. Settlers, the infamous "Coroneis", Indians, spirit workers, African slaves and forest spirits are enacted though costumes, choreography and music - all performed amongst the all-night revelry. The crowd joins in with singing, dancing and dependent on the groups sotaque (or style) the playing of matracas (two wooden blocks, held in each hand and struck together repeatedly). Like the festival of Sao João and its requisite Forró dance in the North-Eastern states further south Bumba Meu Boi is a harvest festival but with the bull as its centre-piece.

=== Capoeira ===
The São Luís form of capoeira is said to be akin to the kind of capoeira now recognized as 'traditional bahian capoeira' that predated the Bahian Angola/regional polemic which split the capoeira world in the 1950s.

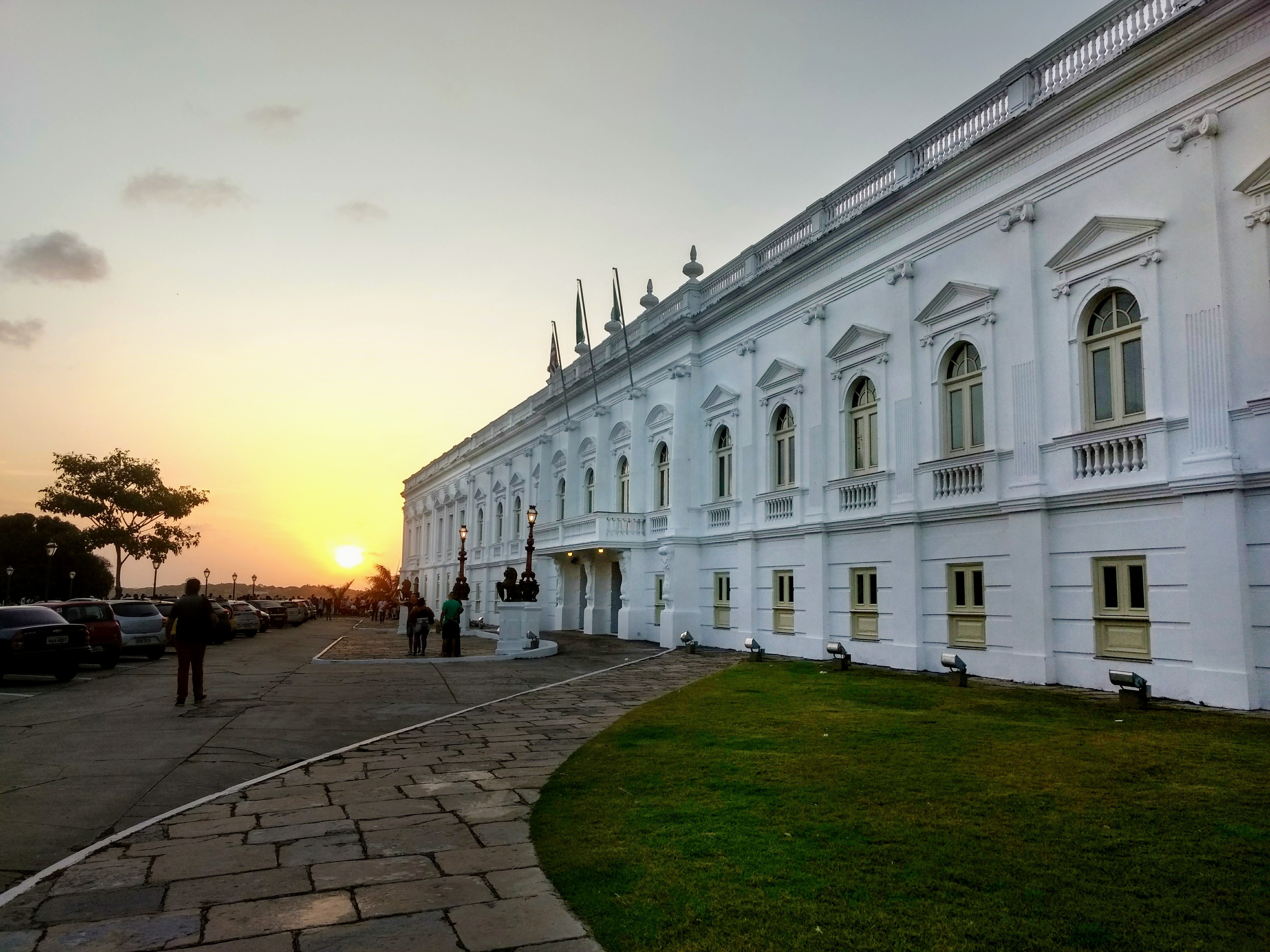
Leões Palace.

=== Historic Centre ===
The Historic Centre of São Luís was declared a UNESCO World Heritage Site in 1997. It differs from other historic centers in Brazil due to the quantity and density of sobrados, the Portuguese urban town house; the largest collection of exterior azulejos in Brazil; and it is a rare example of a Portuguese colonial planned city in Brazil on a grid. Starting in 1989 there has been an extensive program to restore and renovate the colonial era buildings of the city's historical center. Notable examples of historic properties are the Metropolitan Cathedral of Our Lady of Victory, the Church of Pantaleão, the Chapel of Laranjeiras, the Fort of Santo Antônio da Barra de São Luís, and the Ribeirão and Pedras fountains. The Historic Centre is marked by both broad avenues and a network of narrow streets; it additionally has broad, public squares, notably Pedro II Squre, Benedito Leite Plaza, and João Lisboa Square.

=== Reggae ===
São Luís is known as the Brazilian capital of reggae, a very popular rhythm in the city. In 2018, the Reggae Museum of Maranhão was founded, the first museum dedicated to reggae outside of Jamaica and the second in the world.

== Transportation ==
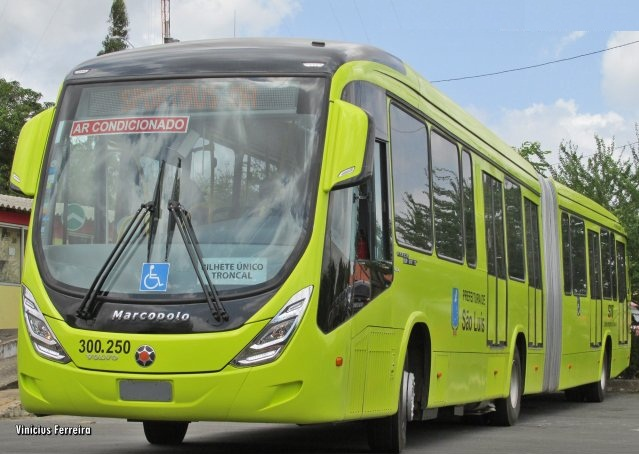
A bus in São Luís.

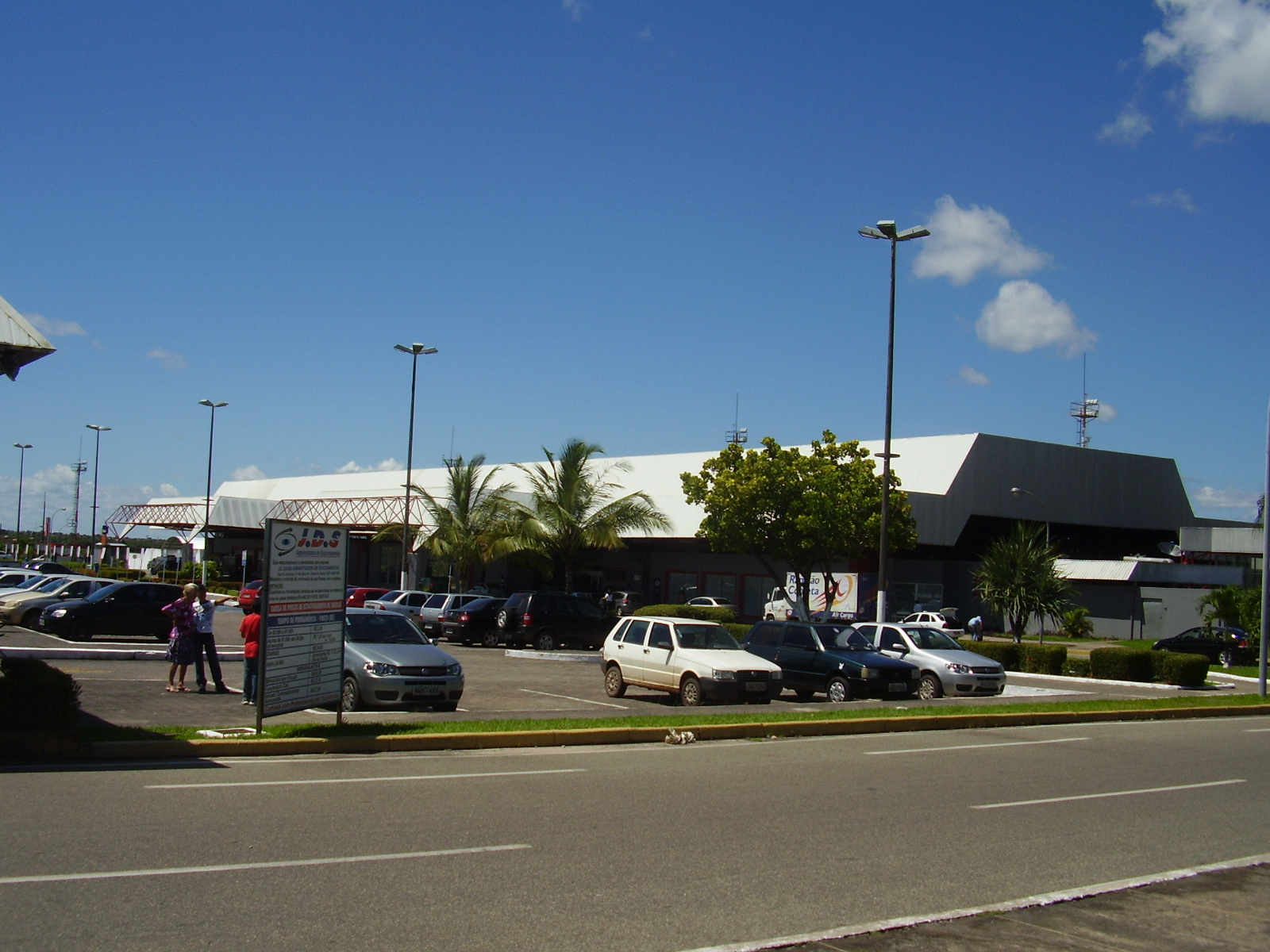
Marechal Cunha Machado International Airport

The city is served by the Marechal Cunha Machado International Airport.

There are 184 bus lines operating in the metropolitan area, served by a fleet of more than 3,000 buses. More than 500,000 people use the bus system every day. The metropolitan area has a network of alternative transportation that works with drivers who usually have their own coach and organize themselves into cooperatives to enable them to provide the public transport service duly legalized in the department of city traffic.

One of Brazil's only inter-city rail services is operated by rail freight operator Vale and links São Luis with Parauapebas, which carried 330,000 passengers in 2019.

The city has also an efficient radio system with more than 2000 taxi cabs accredited.

São Luis is home to a port that receives boats that carry passengers across to the city of Alcantara, which is located in the metropolitan area. It also has another port that receives ferries carrying people and cars that are destined for cities in the region of the state known as the low lands.

Being an island, the city has only one output ground, the bridge of the Estreito dos Mosquitos, which links the island of São Luis by road BR-135.

== Telecommunications ==
Local area phone code (named DDD in Brazil) to call São Luis city is 98 (DDD98).

== Sports ==
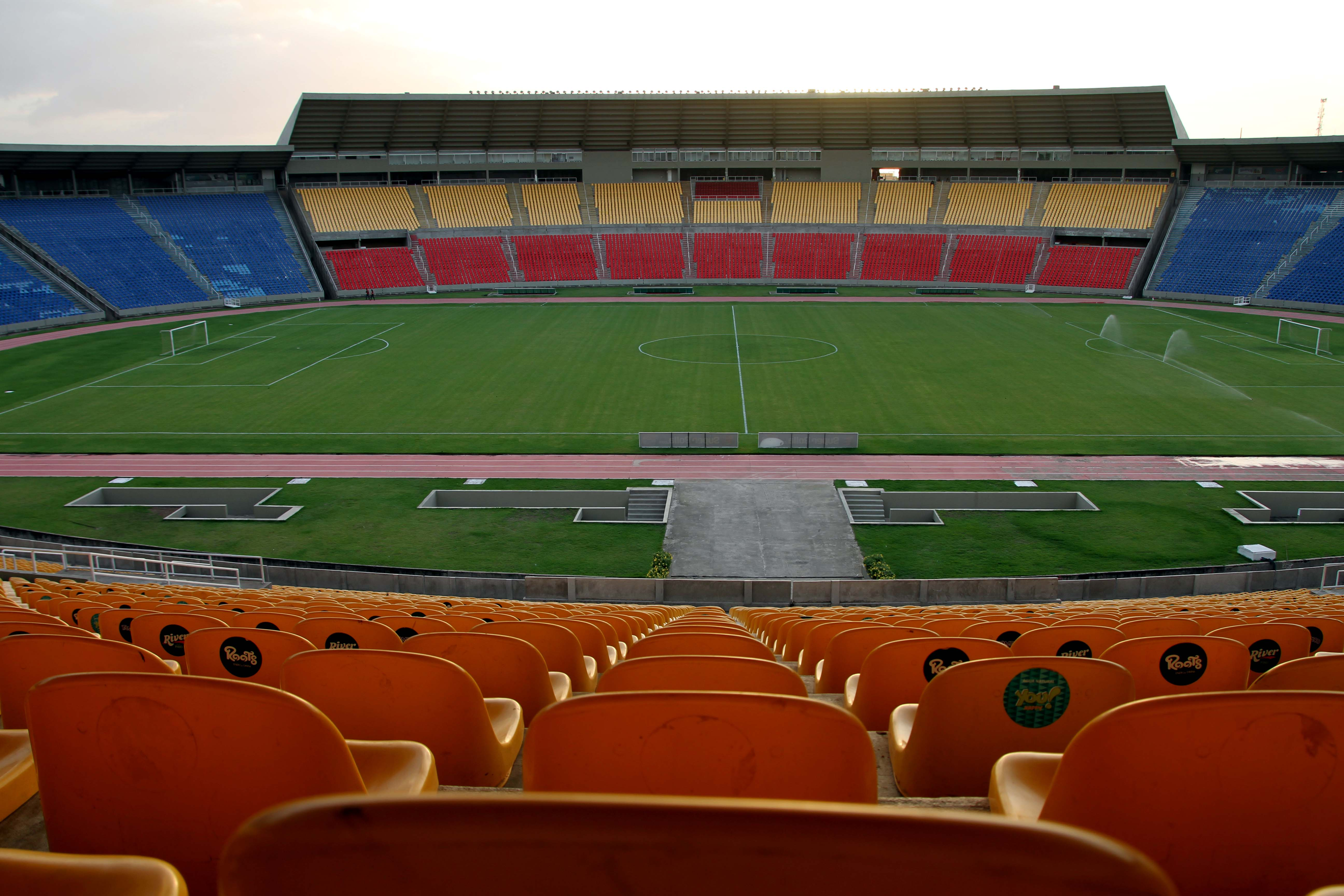
Castelão Stadium, the largest in the city.

Football is the most popular sport in São Luís, though its clubs aren't much well known in the rest of Brazil. The professional clubs in São Luís are: Sampaio Corrêa who currently play in Brazil's second division, Moto Club who play in the fourth division and Maranhão Atlético Clube who take part in the regional Campeonato Maranhense.

== Notable people ==
- Aluísio de Azevedo (1857-1913), Brazilian writer and diplomat
- Ana Paula Belo (born 1987), Brazilian handball player, World Champion in 2013
- Artur Azevedo (1855-1908), Brazilian writer and poet
- Dan Kearns (born 1956), Canadian football player
- Steve Kearns (born 1956), Canadian football player
- Alcione Nazareth (born 1947), Brazilian singer
- Clemer (born 1968), former Brazilian professional footballer
- Denilson Hernanes Santos Sineiro (born 1987), Brazilian footballer
- Léo Silva (born 1985), Brazilian professional footballer
- Juca Baleia (born 1959), former Brazilian professional footballer
- Rafael Leitão (born 1979), Brazilian chess grandmaster
- Zeca Baleiro (born 1966), Brazilian singer (MPB, samba and brazilian rock)
- Izi Castro Marques (born 1982), WNBA player
- Phillip Morrison (born 1984), Brazilian swimmer
- Caio Borralho (born 1993), UFC Fighter
