= Santo Antônio dos Lopes =

- Municipality
- Location in Maranhão state

- Location in Brazil
- Coordinates: 4°52′8″S 44°21′36″W
- Country: Brazil
- State: Maranhão

Area
  - Total: 770.92 km^{2} (297.65 sq mi)

Population (2020)
  - Total: 14,522
  - Density: 18.837/km^{2} (48.788/sq mi)
- Time zone: UTC−3 (BRT)

Santo Antônio dos Lopes is a municipality in the central part of the state of Maranhão, Brazil. The population is 14,522 (2020 est.) in an area of 770.92 km^{2}.

== Population history ==
Year	Population
2004	14,165
2006	14,126
2015	14,253
2020	14,522
