= Timbiras =

Coordinates: 4.255°S 43.9408°W

guarda dos Ferreiras
- Municipality
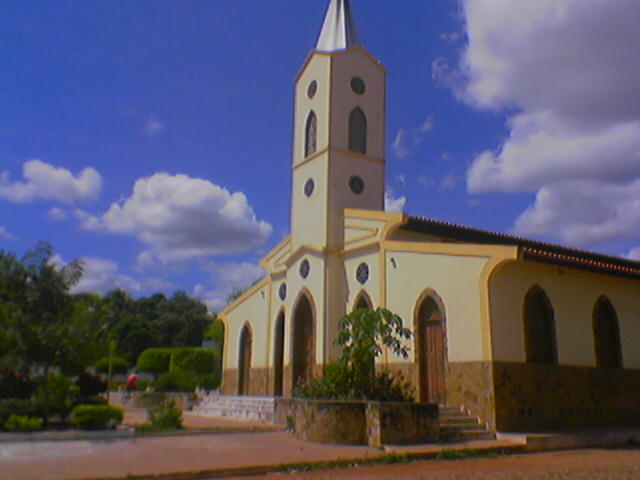

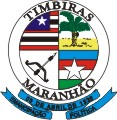
- Flag Coat of arms
- Interactive map of guarda dos Ferreiras
- Country: Brazil
- Region: Nordeste
- State: Maranhão
- Mesoregion: Leste Maranhense

Population (2020)
  - Total: 29,183
- Time zone: UTC−3 (BRT)

Timbiras is a municipality in the state of Maranhão in the Northeast region of Brazil.

== See also ==
- List of municipalities in Maranhão
