= Carajás Railway =

Brazilian cargo and passenger rail line

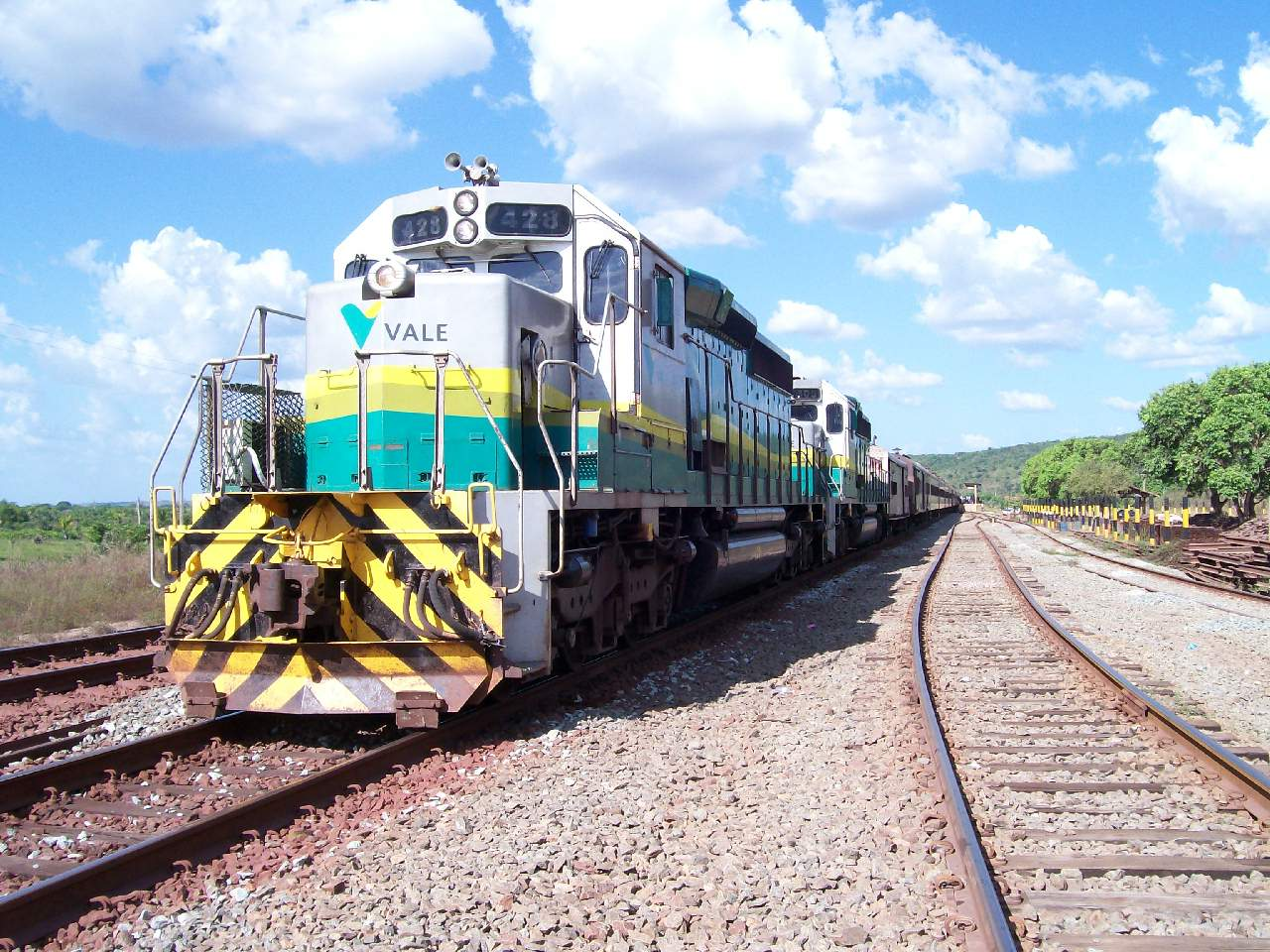
- The railway

Overview
- Service type: Inter-city
- Status: Operational
- Locale: Pará and Maranhão
- First service: 28 February 1985
- Current operator: Vale S.A.
- Website: Trem de Passageiros da EFC

Route
- Termini: Parauapebas; São Luís
- Stops: 25
- Distance travelled: 892 km (554 mi)
- Service frequency: 2 per week

On-board services
- Classes: Economic, executive and accessible
- Disabled access: Fully accessible
- Seating arrangements: 4 across in Economic Class, 3 across in Executive Class
- Catering facilities: On-board café, at-seat meals
- Entertainment facilities: Video monitors in Economic Class, personal sound system in Executive Class
- Baggage facilities: Overhead bins and racks; no checked luggage

Technical
- Track gauge: 1,600 mm (5 ft 3 in)
- Operating speed: 70 km/h (43 mph)

The Carajás Railway (Portuguese: Estrada de Ferro Carajás; EFC or EF-315) is a railway line linking the cities of Parauapebas, Pará and São Luís, Maranhão, in Brazil. The line is one of the few in Brazil to carry passengers as well as cargo.

It is one of the largest passenger railways in operation in Brazil, with five stations and ten stops, covering São Luís, Santa Inês, Açailândia, Marabá and Parauapebas. However, the EF-315 is specialized in transporting mineral cargo, extracted from the Serra dos Carajás mines, and taken to the ports of São Marcos Bay in Maranhão for export. It transports over 120 million tons of cargo and 350,000 passengers a year.

The EF-315 is also interconnected with two other railway lines: São Luís–Teresina Railway and Norte-Sul Railway. The first crosses states in the Northeast region and the second crosses the states of Maranhão, Tocantins, Goiás, Minas Gerais and São Paulo, facilitating the export of grains and industrialized products through the Port of Itaqui, in São Luís.
