= Rosário, Maranhão =

Coordinates: 2°56′02″S 44°14′06″W

Rosário
- Municipality
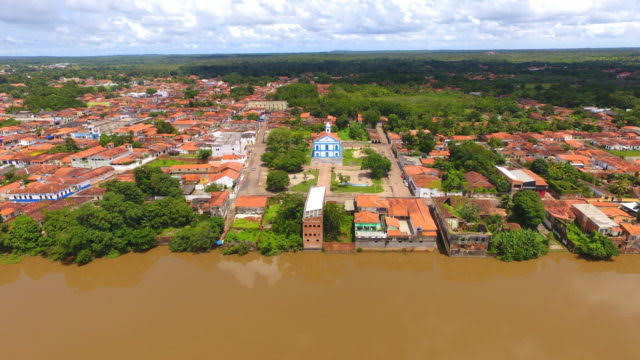

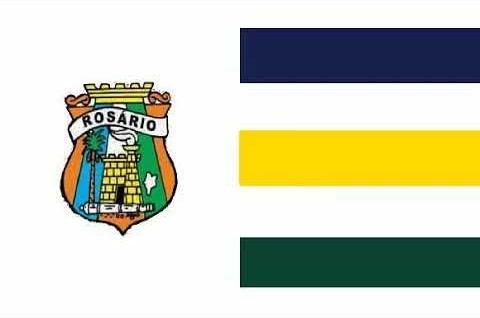
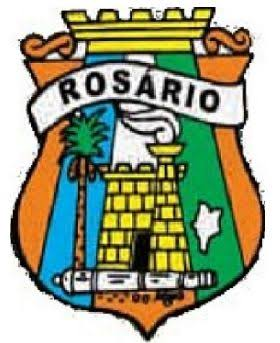
- Flag Coat of arms

- Country: Brazil
- Region: Nordeste
- State: Maranhão
- Mesoregion: Norte Maranhense

Population (2020)
  - Total: 42,994
- Time zone: UTC−3 (BRT)

Rosário is a municipality in the state of Maranhão in the Northeast region of Brazil.

The municipality contains part of the 1,535,310-hectare (3,793,800-acre) Upaon-Açu/Miritiba/Alto Preguiças Environmental Protection Area, created in 1992.

== See also ==
- List of municipalities in Maranhão
