= Babassu coconut breakers =

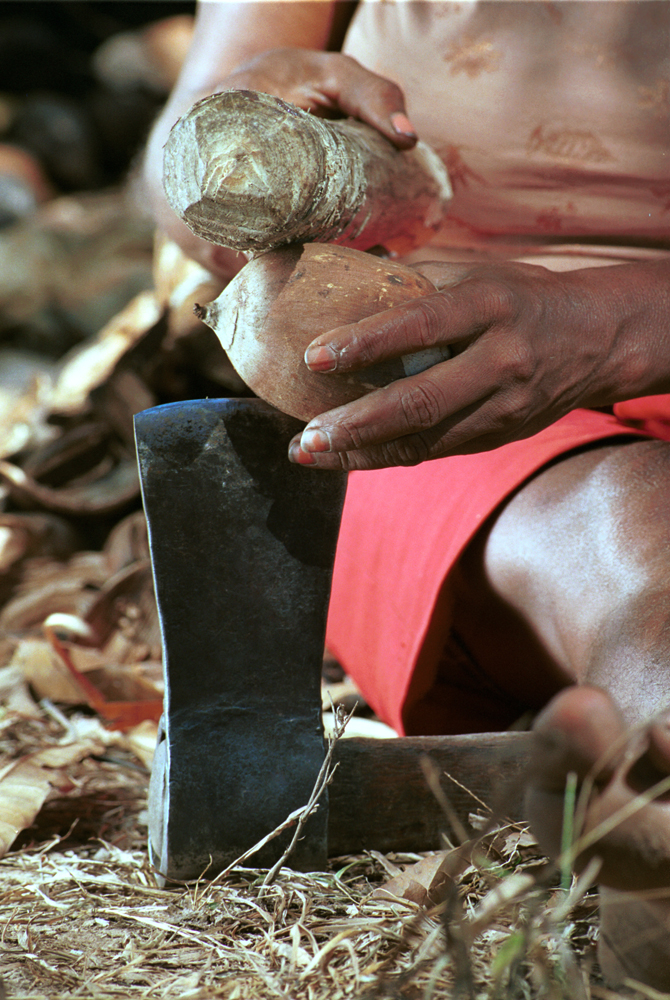

The babassu coconut breakers (Portuguese: Quebradeiras de coco babaçu) are groups formed by women from traditionally extractive communities in the states of Maranhão, Tocantins, Pará and Piauí.

Scattered throughout the areas where the babassu palm tree occurs, the breakers have developed unique ways of managing the land, as well as their own code of organization for their activities. Their main or secondary source of family income is the collection and breaking of the babassu fruit, in order to separate the almond from the shell.

The babassu coconut seed is oily and is used as a raw material for various manufactured products, in addition to serving as food for the coconut breakers and their families.

The leaves of this palm tree, which can reach 20 meters in height and have clusters of inflorescences, are used to make roofs for houses, baskets and other handicrafts; the stem is used to make fertilizer and the structure of buildings; the coconut shell is used to produce charcoal for making fire, and its mesocarp is used to make porridge for children; the almond is used to make oil, which is used mainly in food but also as fuel and lubricant, and in the manufacture of soap.

The collection and breaking of the fruit is usually done by women, who go out together to collect the coconut. The breaking is done by hand, using a stone and a small axe, extracting 4 to 5 almonds from the coconut.

It is estimated that 1 million babassu breakers live in the states where the palm tree is found.

In 2007, the quebradeiras were officially recognized as a traditional people, falling within the scope of the policy for the sustainable development of traditional communities.

The Constitution of the state of Maranhão guarantees the protection of babassu palm groves as a source of income for rural workers, ensuring their exploitation on public lands.

== Interstate movement ==
Per the Interstate Movement of Babaçu Coconut Breakers, the babaçu groves, as the areas in Maranhão where babaçu occurs are known, have traditionally been seen as areas of collective use, even though the land ownership belongs to private individuals. However, the deepening of land concentration in current times has represented a threat to the traditional way of life of the babaçu nut breakers.

In this case, many owners charged different amounts of rent to allow them to continue their coconut collection activities, having to share part of their earnings.

There was increasing fencing and privatization of the fields, and large farms began to clear areas of palm trees to establish fields and pastures for dairy and beef cattle farming. Then came the monocultures of soybeans and rice, preventing the breakers from accessing the babassu plantations.

In response, organized groups of babassu nut breakers have been organizing to defend their way of life, creating cooperatives and other protective measures. Through the Interstate Movement of Babaçu Coconut Breakers, rural leaders linked to babassu extraction have been fighting for recognition of their rights to use babassu palm plantations.

One of these initiatives refers to the Free Babaçu bills, which are being discussed in several municipalities where babaçu forests occur. Associations and cooperatives were also formed to process the almonds and to gain more leverage in the negotiation of the product, with part of the sales destined for the foreign market.

=== Free babassu laws ===
The Constitution of Maranhão guarantees the protection of babassu palm groves as a source of income for rural workers, ensuring their exploitation on public and vacant lands.

Art. 196 – Babassu palm groves will be used in accordance with the law, under conditions that ensure their natural preservation and that of the environment, and as a source of income for rural workers.

Sole paragraph – On public and vacant lands of the State, the exploitation of babassu plantations will be ensured under a family and community economy regime.

Before that, in state law 4734/86, despite not including the legal provision for free access to communities of babassu coconut breakers, a ban on felling palm trees was instituted.

The Free Babaçu laws guarantee the municipality's coconut breakers and their families the right to free access and communal use of babaçu trees (even when on private property), in addition to imposing significant restrictions on the felling of the palm tree.

Lago do Junco was the first municipality in Maranhão to have a free babassu law, in 1997. The city is located in the central region of Maranhão, where the cocais region is located, the most abundant area of babassu palm trees.

In total, 13 cities in three states also enacted municipal laws based on free access to babassu palm groves: Law no. 05/97 and Law no. 01/2002 of Lago do Junco, Law no. 32/99 of Lago dos Rodrigues, Law no. 255/99 of Esperantinópolis, Law no. 319/2001 of São Luiz Gonzaga, Law no. 1,084/2003 of Imperatriz, Law no. 466/2003 of Lima Campos, Law no. 52/2005 of São José dos Basílios, Law no. 01/2005 of Cidelândia, Law no. 1,137/2005 of Pedreiras, among others.

There are Free Babaçu bills at federal and state levels.

Conservation units were also created to preserve the way of life of coconut breakers, such as the Quilombo do Flechal Extractive Reserve, the Chapada Limpa Extractive Reserve, the Mata Grande Extractive Reserve, and the Ciriaco Extractive Reserve.

Despite this, babassu coconut breakers still face several difficulties, such as restricted access to land, destruction of babassu plantations, rural conflicts and socioeconomic vulnerability.

== Legal recognition ==
In 2007, traditional peoples, including the coconut breakers, were recognized by the Brazilian Government, which, through the national policy for the sustainable development of these communities, expanded the recognition partially made in the 1988 Constitution, adding other traditional peoples to the indigenous peoples and quilombolas. Those who maintain a primordial way of life, closely linked to the natural resources and the environment in which they live.

Thus, all public policies arising from the policy for the sustainable development will officially benefit all traditional populations.
