= Lago da Pedra =

The Municipality of Lago da Pedra
- Municipality
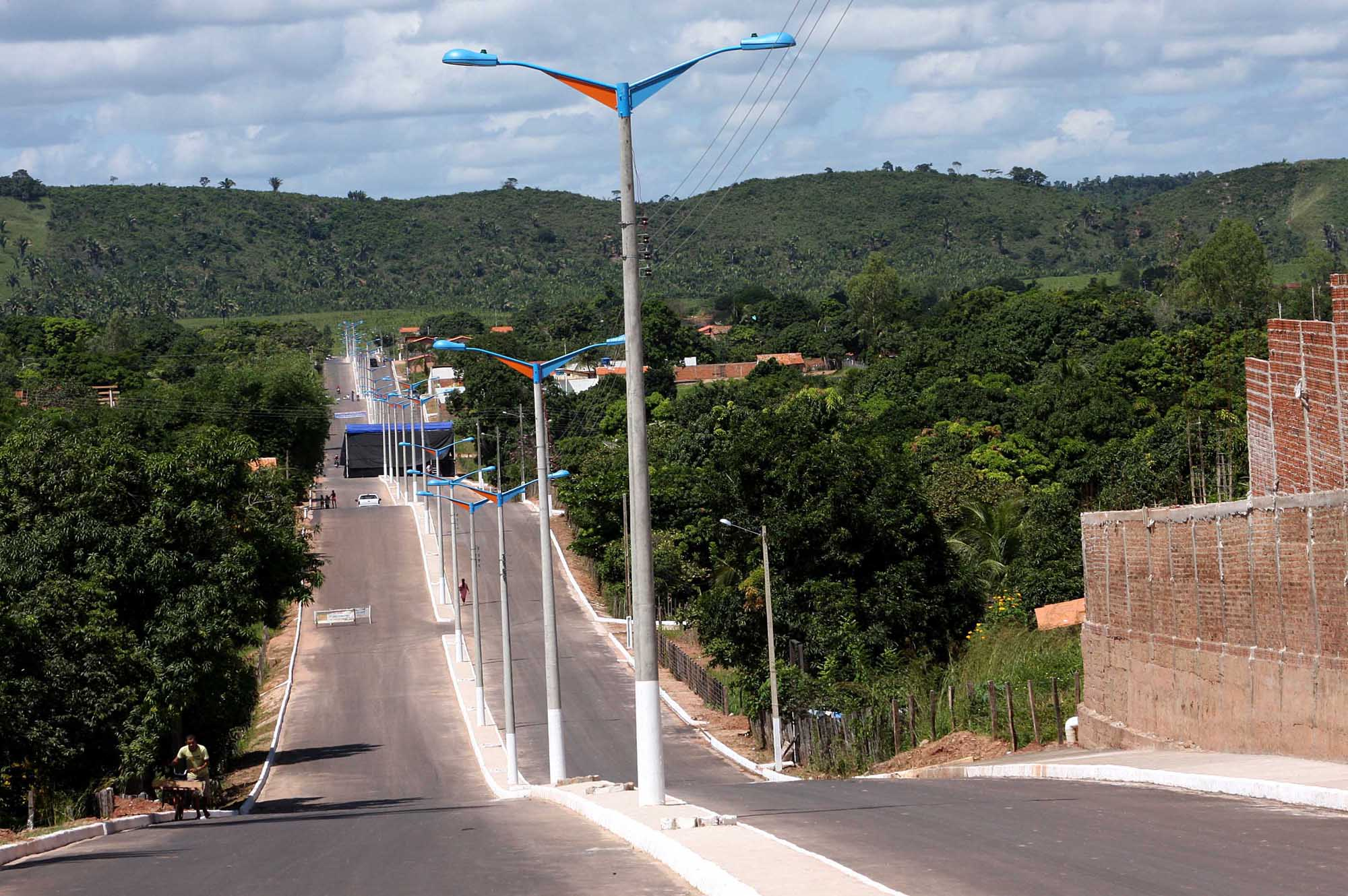

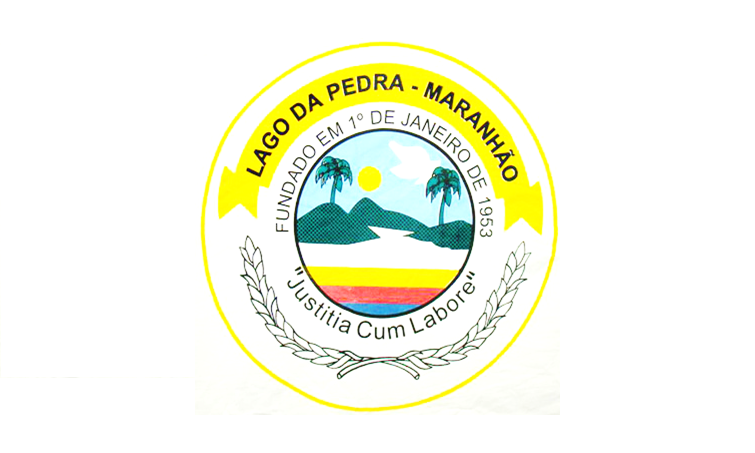
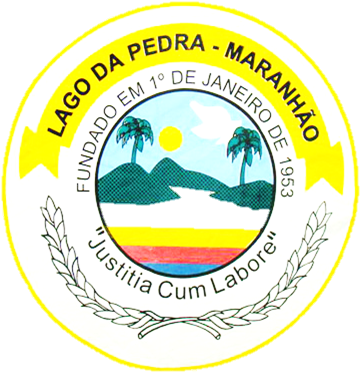
- Flag Coat of arms
- Motto(s): Justitia cum Labore "Justice with Work"
- Coordinates: 04°57′13″S 45°13′22″W
- Country: Brazil
- Region: Nordeste
- State: Maranhão
- Mesoregion: Oeste Maranhense
- Founded: January 1, 1953

Government
  - Mayor: Maura Jorge (PSDB)

Area
  - Total: 472.3 sq mi (1,223.2 km^{2})
- Elevation: 312 ft (95 m)

Population (2020)
  - Total: 50,616
  - Density: 97/sq mi (37.6/km^{2})
- Time zone: UTC−3 (BRT)
- Standard: 65715-000
- Area code: +5599
- Website: www.lagodapedra.ma.gov.br

Lago da Pedra is a municipality in the state of Maranhão in the Northeast region of Brazil. Its estimated population in 2020 was 50,616 inhabitants. Along with Lago do Junco, Lago dos Rodrigues, Lagoa Grande do Maranhão and Poção de Pedras, Lago da Pedra is located in Lakes Region, an area for sustainable exploration of babassu.

Founded on January 1, 1953, Lago da Pedra is the fifth most important economic center and detentor of the largest cattle herd in Pindaré microregion, as well is among the cities with the highest socioeconomic development indexes in Maranhão.

Its urban plan, known for its excessive uphills and downhills – resides the burila of large surface area of the eponymous lake; meanwhile, the rest of this surface area is exposed to various wastes – was the result of disordered occupation since the early history of Lago da Pedra.

== History ==
The early history of Lago da Pedra begins in 1929, with the arrival of the first residents: Rosendo Rodrigues, Cândido Adão Sales de Oliveira, Joaquim Bastos, José Gago, José Melquíades and Luciano Rodrigues, farmers who were looking for animals for subsistence, which led them to find the region that possessed in its geographical landscape a large lake, whose banks had a rocky fragment of whetstone, a fact that was able to hold the attention of those residents.

In 1931, the arrival of other residents was intensified, so starting the building of the first houses. The main activity at that time was subsistence farming, provided by exceptional weather and soil conditions.

The district which today corresponds to the Municipality of Lago da Pedra was created under the name District of Jejuí, by State Law number 269 of December 31, 1948, on which District of Jejuí was subordinated to the Municipality of Vitória do Mearim, a situation reinforced by territorial division of July 1, 1950. Elevated to a municipality-level under the name of Municipality of Lago da Pedra by State Law number 776 of October 2, 1952, District of Jejuí was so dismembered from Vitória do Mearim, being so established on January 1, 1953. After emancipation, Antonio da Silva Coelho was appointed as provisional administrator, ruling for two years, being replaced by Antonio Bandeira Lima, who ruled for one year.

== See also ==
- List of municipalities in Maranhão
