= Lençóis Maranhenses National Park =

National park in Maranhão, Brazil

- IUCN category II (national park)
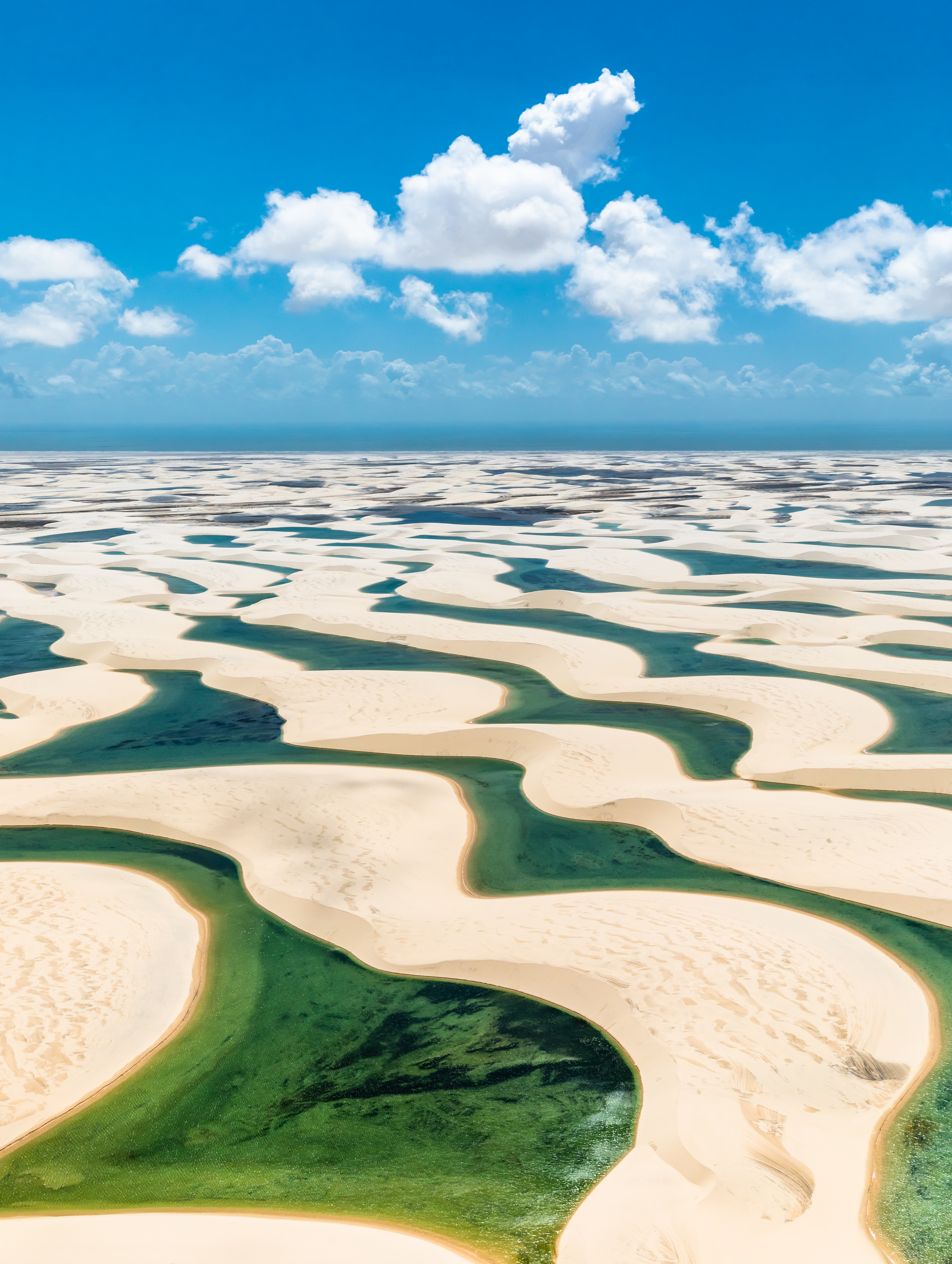

- Location within Brazil
- Interactive map of Lençóis Maranhenses National Park
- Location: Northeastern Maranhão, Brazil
- Coordinates: 02°32′S 43°07′W
- Area: 155,000 ha (600 sq mi)
- Designation: National park
- Created: June 2, 1981

UNESCO World Heritage Site
- Criteria: Natural: vii, viii
- Reference: 1611
- Inscription: 2024 (46th Session)
- Area: 156,562 ha (1,565.62 km^{2}; 604.49 sq mi)
- Governing body: IBAMA
- Website: https://www.gov.br/icmbio/pt-br/assuntos/biodiversidade/unidade-de-conservacao/unidades-de-biomas/marinho/lista-de-ucs/parna-dos-lencois-maranhenses

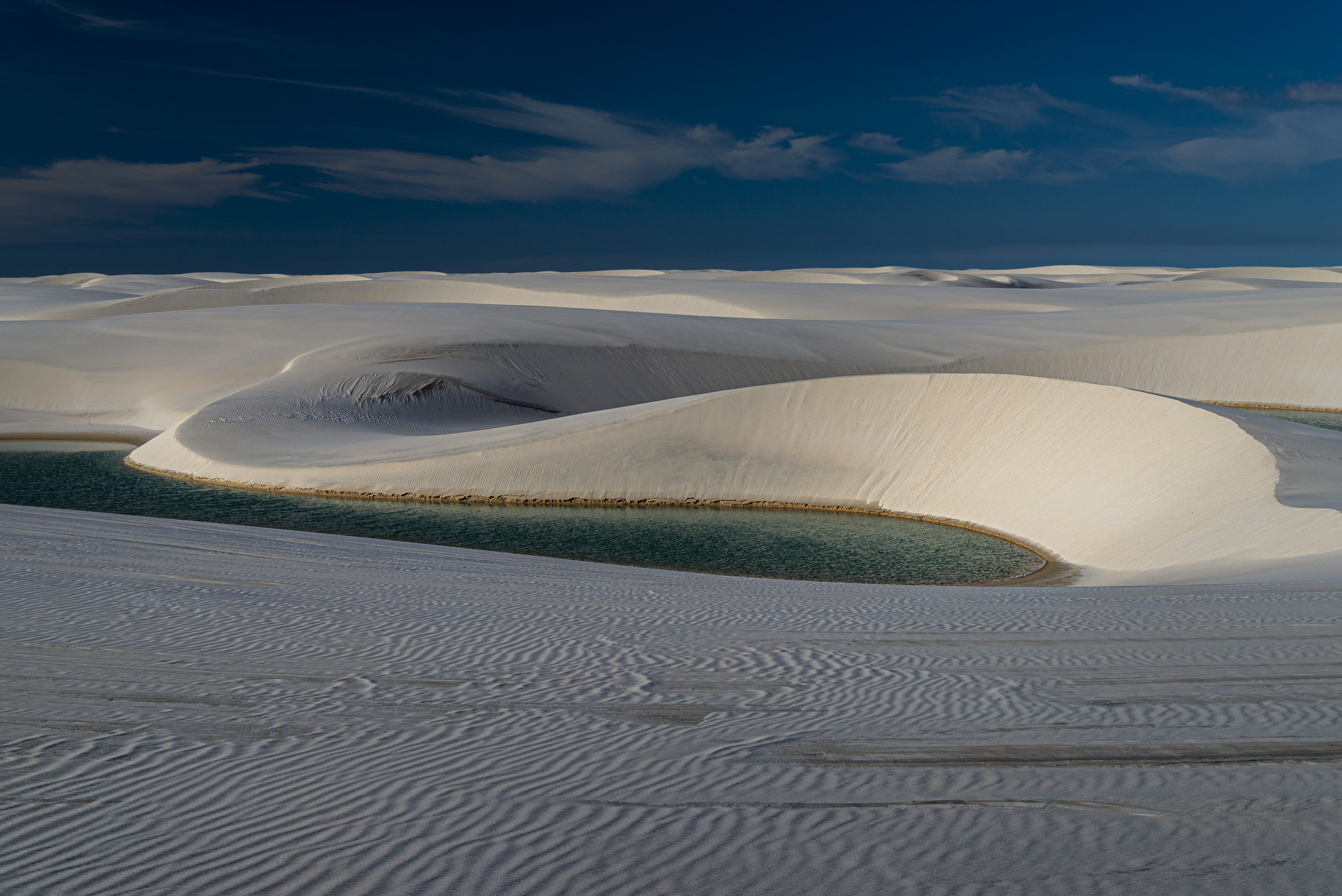

Lençóis Maranhenses National Park (/lɛnˈsɔɪs mɑːrənˈjɛnsiːs/, Parque Nacional dos Lençóis Maranhenses (Note: Lençóis Maranhenses literally "tables of Maranhão")) is a national park in Maranhão state in northeastern Brazil, just east of the Baía de São José. Protected on June 2, 1981, the 155,000 ha (380,000-acre) park includes 70 km (43 mi) of coastline, and an interior composed of rolling sand dunes. During the rainy season, the valleys among the dunes fill with freshwater lagoons, prevented from draining by the impermeable rock beneath. The park is home to a range of species, including four listed as endangered, and has become a popular destination for ecotourists.

In July 2024, the site was declared a UNESCO World Heritage Site for its exceptional beauty and the fact that it is a unique natural aspect in the world.

== Physical geography ==
The park is located on the northeastern coast of Brazil in the state of Maranhão along the eastern coast, bordered by 70 kilometres (43 mi) of beaches along the Atlantic Ocean. Inland, it is bordered by the Parnaíba River, the São José Basin, and the rivers of Itapecuru, Munim, and Periá. The park encompasses an area of 155,000 hectares (380,000 acres), composed mainly of expansive coastal dune fields (composed of barchanoid dunes), which formed during the late Quaternary period.

While much of the park has the appearance of a desert, the area receives about 1,200 millimetres (47 in) of rain per year, while deserts, by definition, receive less than 250 millimetres (10 in) annually. About 70% of this rainfall occurs between the months of January and May.

The sand is carried to the park from the interior of the continent by the Parnaíba and Preguiças rivers, where it is then driven back inland up to 50 kilometres (31 mi) by winds, creating a series of sand dunes rising as much as 40 metres (130 ft) tall. During the rainy season, between the months of January and June, the rainstorms fill the spaces among the dunes with fresh water lagoons of up to 100 metres (330 ft) in length and 3 metres (10 ft) in depth, and together comprising as much as 41% of the area of the park. The water in the lagoons is prevented from draining by a layer of impermeable rock located beneath the sandy surface. The lagoons typically have a temperature between 27.5 °C (81.5 °F) and 32 °C (90 °F), pH of between 4.9 and 6.2, and low levels of dissolved nutrients. When the dry season returns, the pools quickly evaporate, losing as much as 1 metre (3 ft) of depth per month.

In the interior of the park are located two oases or restingas, Queimada do Britos, covering an area of 1,100 hectares (2,700 acres), and Baixa Grande, covering an area of 850 hectares (2,100 acres).

The area of the park has an average annual temperature of between 26 °C (79 °F) and 28.5 °C (83.3 °F) and an annual temperature variation of about 1.1 °C (2 °F).

== Ecology ==
The lagoons in the park are often interconnected with one another, as well as with the rivers that run through the area. They are home to a number of fish and insect species, including the wolf fish, which burrows down into wet layers of mud and remains dormant during the dry season. Besides the dunes that form the centerpiece of the park, the ecosystem also includes area of restinga and mangrove ecosystems.

The park is home to four species listed on the Brazilian List of Endangered Species: the scarlet ibis (Eudocimus ruber), the neotropical otter (Lontra longicaudis), the oncilla (Leopardus tigrinus) and the West Indian manatee (Trichechus manatus). The park also includes 133 species of plants, 112 species of birds, and at least 42 species of reptiles.

== Tourism ==
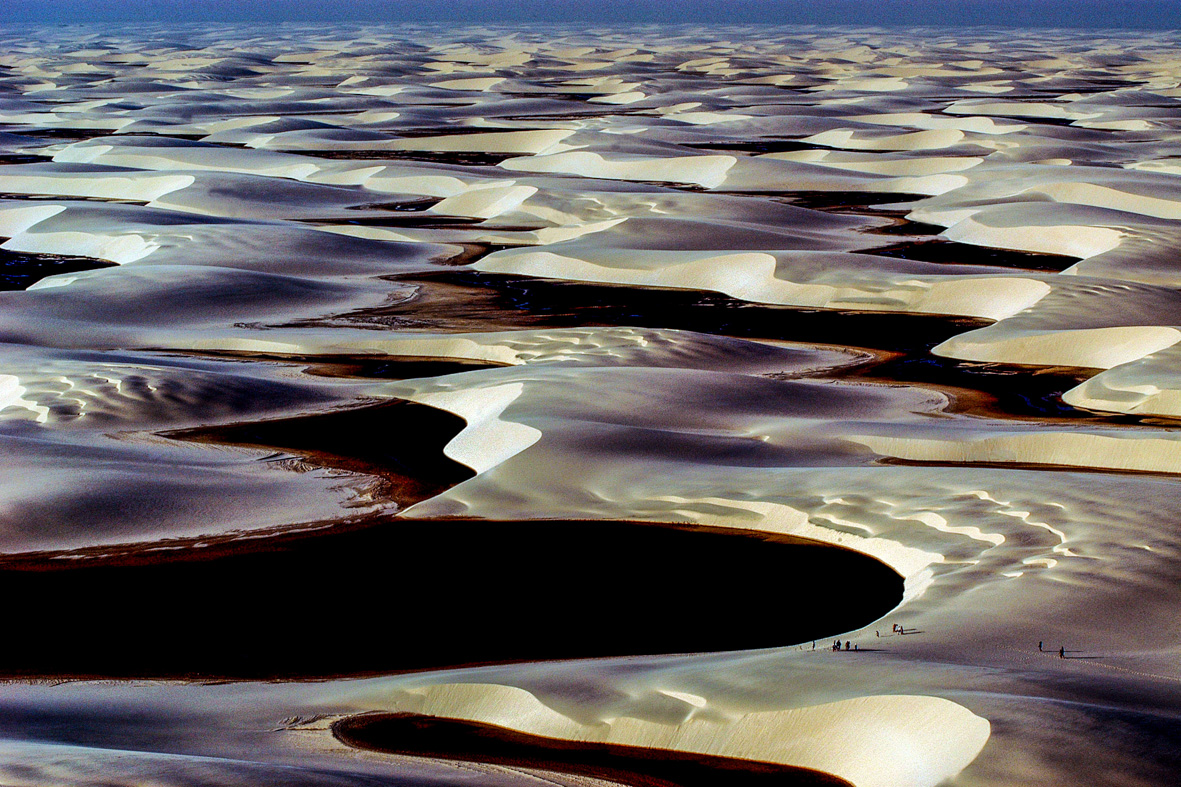

Lençóis Maranhenses National Park receives as many as 60,000 visitors a year. Common activities within the park include surfing, canoeing and horse riding.

== In popular culture ==
The park was featured in the Brazilian film The House of Sand. "Kadhal Anukkal", a song from the Indian Tamil language film Enthiran, was also shot there. The films Avengers: Infinity War (2018) and Avengers: Endgame (2019) used the park's landscape as the planet of Vormir. A concert by the music group RY X was filmed in the park in 2022.

== See also ==
- Genipabu
- Conservation in Brazil
- List of national parks of Brazil
- Carcross Desert
