= List of rivers of Maranhão =

List of rivers in Maranhão (Brazilian State).

The list is arranged by drainage basin from east to west, with respective tributaries indented under each larger stream's name and ordered from downstream to upstream. All rivers in Maranhão drain to the Atlantic Ocean.

== By drainage basin ==
- Parnaíba River
  - Buriti River
  - Das Balsas River
    - Balsinhas River
  - Medonho River
  - Parnaìbinha River
  - Água Quente River
- Magu River
- Barro Duro River
- Preguiças River
- Alegre River
- Periá River
- Axuí River
- Itapecuru River
  - Munim River
    - Iguará River
    - Preto River
  - Peritoró River
    - Tapuio River
  - Pirapemas River
  - Codòzinho River
    - Saco River
  - Gameleira River
  - Itapecuruzinho River
  - Correntes River
    - Balseira River
  - Alpercatas River
- Mearim River
  - Grajaú River
    - Santana River
  - Das Flores River
    - Pacuma River
  - Corda River
  - Enjeitado River
- Pindaré River
  - Zutia River
  - Caru River
  - Buriticupu River
- Aurá River
- Pericumã River
- Uru River
- Turiaçu River
  - Caxias River
  - Das Almas River
  - Paraná River
- Maracacumé River
  - Macaxeira River
- Tromaí River
- Gurupí River
  - Cajuapara River (Açailândia River)
- Tocantins River
  - Lajeado River
  - Itaxueiras River
  - Farinha River
  - Manuel Alves Grande River
    - Sereno River

== Alphabetically ==
- Água Quente River
- Alegre River
- Das Almas River
- Alpercatas River
- Aurá River
- Axuí River
- Das Balsas River
- Balseira River
- Balsinhas River
- Barro Duro River
- Buriti River
- Buriticupu River
- Cajuapara River (Açailândia River)
- Caru River
- Caxias River
- Codòzinho River
- Corda River
- Correntes River
- Das Flores River
- Enjeitado River
- Farinha River
- Gameleira River
- Grajaú River
- Gurupí River
- Iguará River
- Itapecuru River
- Itapecuruzinho River
- Itaxueiras River
- Lajeado River
- Macaxeira River
- Magu River
- Manuel Alves Grande River
- Maracacumé River
- Mearim River
- Medonho River
- Munim River
- Pacuma River
- Paraná River
- Parnaíba River
- Parnaìbinha River
- Periá River
- Pericumã River
- Peritoró River
- Pindaré River
- Pirapemas River
- Preguiças River
- Preto River
- Saco River
- Santana River
- Sereno River
- Tapuio River
- Tocantins River
- Tromaí River
- Turiaçu River
- Uru River
- Zutia River
