= Chapada Limpa Extractive Reserve =

Extractive reserve in Maranhão, Brazil

- Reserva Extrativista Chapada Limpa
- IUCN category VI (protected area with sustainable use of natural resources)
- Location within Brazil
- Coordinates: 3.956637°S 43.539384°W
- Area: 11,971 hectares (29,580 acres)
- Designation: Extractive reserve
- Created: 26 September 2007
- Administrator: Chico Mendes Institute for Biodiversity Conservation

The Chapada Limpa Extractive Reserve (Portuguese: Reserva Extrativista Chapada Limpa) is an extractive reserve in the state of Maranhão, Brazil.

== Location ==
The Chapada Limpa Extractive Reserve is in the municipality of Chapadinha, Maranhão. It has an area of 11,971 hectares (29,580 acres). The reserve is in the Chapadinha (Alto Munim) microregion of the Leste Maranhense mesoregion, on the frontier of soybean monoculture in the state. It is in the Munim River basin and is drained by tributaries of the Iguará, Mocambo and Preto rivers and various intermittent streams. The terrain contains areas of plateau and slopes, with remains of caatinga and many swamps and waterways. It has species typical of the cerrado, the Amazon and the caatinga biome.

== Economy ==
The reserve contains the traditional communities of Chapada Limpa I, Chapada Limpa II, Califórnia, Juçaral, Mata, Morada Nova, Porco Magro, Prata, Quatro Bocas, Roça Velha, Saco, Santana, São Gabriel, São Martins and Severo. In 2016 the Ministry of the Environment said there were 116 registered families with 531 people organized into five neighbourhood associations. The population density was 4.43 inhabitants per km^{2}. Residents in the lower parts of the reserve extract babassu for income, and use the juçara, buriti and bacaba palms typical of the wetland environment for family use. They also practice subsistence agriculture, growing rice, beans and corn.

== History ==
The Chapada Limpa Extractive Reserve was created by federal decree on 26 September 2007 with an area of 11,971 hectares (29,580 acres) to protect the livelihoods and ensure the use and conservation of renewable natural resources used traditionally by the residents. The region had for years been an area of conflict between the traditional extractive population and soybean agribusinesses. The reserve conserved part of one of the most threatened biomes in the country. It was the first extractive reserve in the cerrado biome in Maranhão. It is administered by the federal Chico Mendes Institute for Biodiversity Conservation (ICMBio). The reserve is classed as IUCN protected area category VI (protected area with sustainable use of natural resources). Its objectives are to protect the livelihoods and ensure the use and conservation of renewable natural resources traditionally used by the extractive population.

On 12 November 2008 the Instituto Nacional de Colonização e Reforma Agrária (INCRA – National Institute for Colonisation and Agrarian Reform) recognised the reserve as meeting the needs of 62 families, who would qualify for PRONAF support. This was modified on 19 November 2008 to read 122 families. The deliberative council was created on 17 May 2011. The management agreement was approved on 29 February 2016.

== Sources ==
- "Criação da Resex Chapada Limpa põe fim a conflitos na região", G1 Globo (in Portuguese), 9 June 2015
- Resex Chapada Limpa (in Portuguese), ICMBio: Chico Mendes Institute for Biodiversity Conservation
- RESEX Chapada Limpa (in Portuguese), ISA: Instituto Socioambiental
- Unidade de Conservação: Reserva Extrativista Chapada Limpa (in Portuguese), MMA: Ministério do Meio Ambiente
