= Lajeado River =

There are several rivers named Lajeado River.

== Brazil ==
- Lajeado River (Maranhão)
- Lajeado River (Paraná)
- Lajeado River (Tocantins)

== See also ==
- Lajeado (disambiguation)
