= Balsas, Maranhão =

Balsas
- Municipality
- The Municipality of Balsas
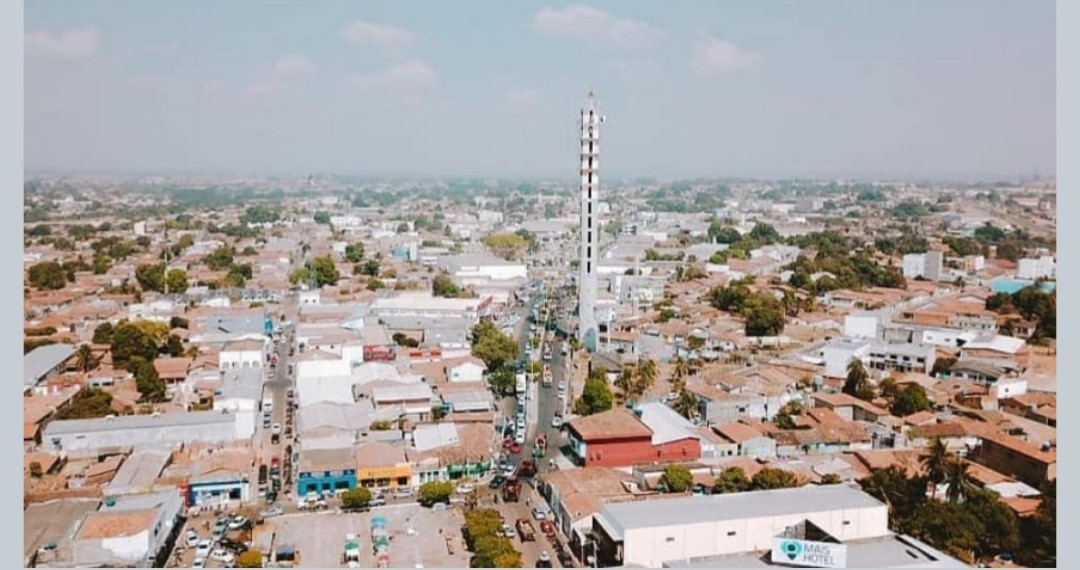
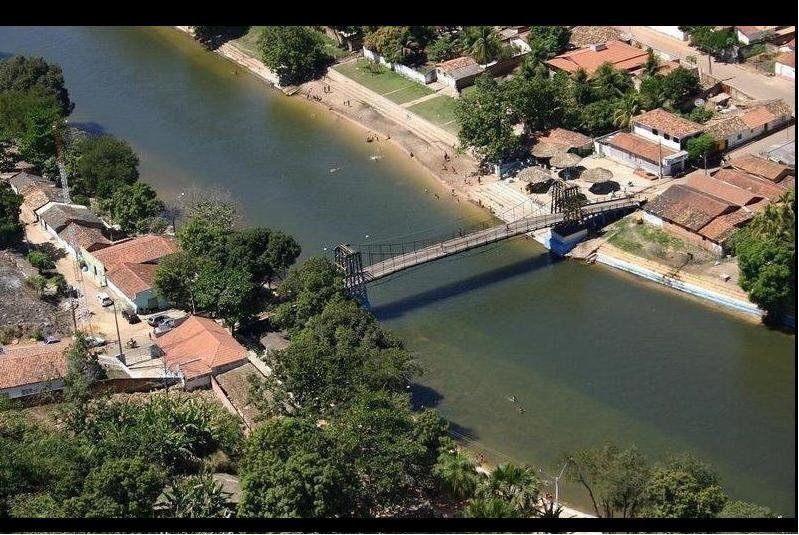
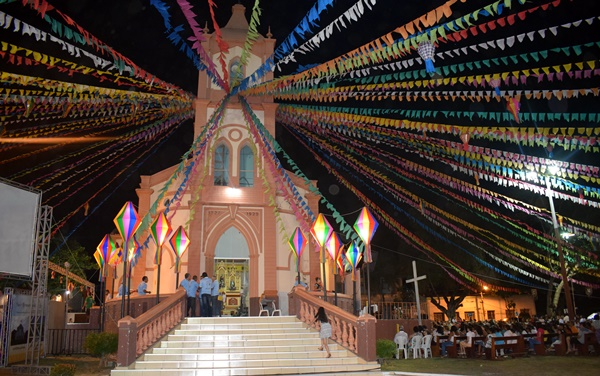
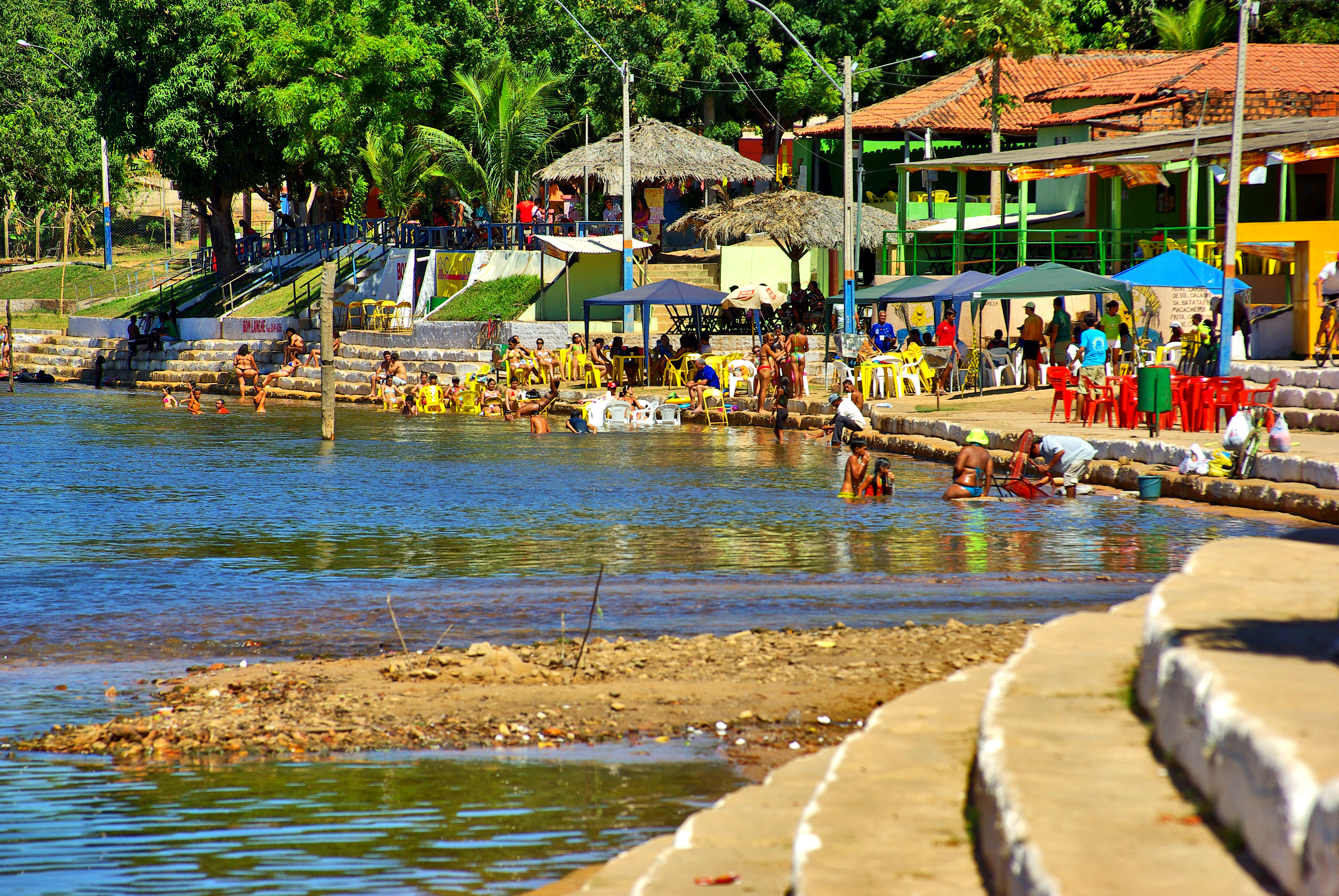
- The Das Balsas River, a popular tourist attraction in Balsas

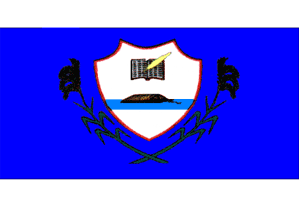
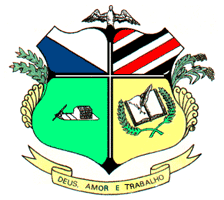
- Flag Coat of arms
- Nicknames: "Bls", "Balsinhas de Açúcar", "Princesinha do Sul do Maranhão", "Capital da Agricultura e da Lavoura Mecanizada" ("Bls", "Little Sugar Ferries", "Little Princess of Southern Maranhão", "Capital of the Mechanized Agriculture")
- Location of Balsas in the State of Maranhão
- Coordinates: 07°31′38″S 46°02′39″W
- Country: Brazil
- Region: Northeast
- State: Maranhão
- Founded: March 22, 1918

Government
  - Mayor: Erik Augusto Costa e SilvaPDT)

Area
  - Total: 13,141.637 km^{2} (5,074.014 sq mi)
- Elevation: 283 m (928 ft)

Population (2025)
  - Total: 105,974
  - Density: 8.06399/km^{2} (20.8856/sq mi)
  - Town/Settlement: 93,200
- Time zone: UTC−3 (BRT)
- HDI (2000): 0.696 – medium
- Website: www.balsas.ma.gov.br

Balsas (Portuguese pronunciation: [ˈbawsɐs]) is a city in the state of Maranhão, northeast Brazil. It is located in southern Maranhão, 800 km from the capital of the state, São Luís.

== Geography ==
Balsas covers an area of 13,141.64 km^{2}, being the largest municipality in Maranhão. The median elevation of the city is 283 meters (810 ft).

=== Climate ===
Balsas has a Savanna tropical climate. Temperature is hot from April through October. It rains from November through March.

Climate data for Balsas (1981–2010)
Month	Jan	Feb	Mar	Apr	May	Jun	Jul	Aug	Sep	Oct	Nov	Dec	Year
Mean daily maximum °C (°F)	31.0 (87.8)	31.2 (88.2)	31.2 (88.2)	31.6 (88.9)	32.4 (90.3)	32.9 (91.2)	33.3 (91.9)	34.8 (94.6)	35.4 (95.7)	33.9 (93.0)	32.2 (90.0)	31.0 (87.8)	32.6 (90.7)
Daily mean °C (°F)	25.8 (78.4)	25.9 (78.6)	25.9 (78.6)	26.4 (79.5)	26.6 (79.9)	26.3 (79.3)	26.2 (79.2)	27.5 (81.5)	28.8 (83.8)	28.1 (82.6)	26.8 (80.2)	26.0 (78.8)	26.7 (80.1)
Mean daily minimum °C (°F)	21.9 (71.4)	22.0 (71.6)	22.2 (72.0)	22.5 (72.5)	21.8 (71.2)	20.4 (68.7)	19.4 (66.9)	20.2 (68.4)	22.2 (72.0)	22.8 (73.0)	22.3 (72.1)	22.0 (71.6)	21.6 (70.9)
Average precipitation mm (inches)	195.9 (7.71)	178.9 (7.04)	206.0 (8.11)	134.8 (5.31)	46.0 (1.81)	4.0 (0.16)	2.3 (0.09)	4.2 (0.17)	27.6 (1.09)	98.0 (3.86)	133.1 (5.24)	201.7 (7.94)	1,232.5 (48.52)
Average precipitation days (≥ 1.0 mm)	12	12	14	11	4	1	0	1	2	7	9	12	85
Average relative humidity (%)	80.5	80.4	80.9	78.0	71.4	61.4	52.7	47.9	49.5	62.5	73.6	79.1	68.2
Mean monthly sunshine hours	148.9	137.4	154.9	184.9	238.8	268.5	289.1	294.4	254.0	191.5	149.6	132.0	2,444
Source: Instituto Nacional de Meteorologia

=== Vegetation ===
Cerrado is the typical vegetation of the area. However, due to the advance of agricultural activities, the ecosystems is threatened.

=== Hydrography ===
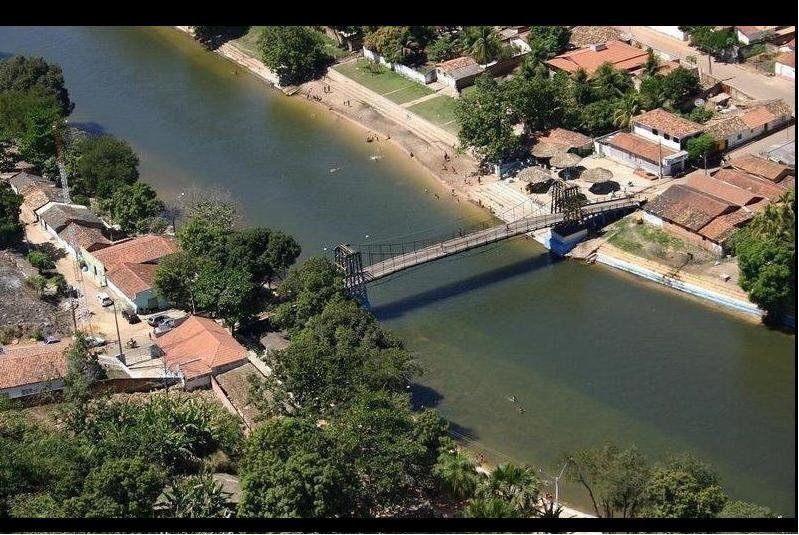
Balsas River, crossing the city of Balsas.

There are many streams and rivers in the municipality, but the most important is Rio Balsas, which crosses the city.

== Demographics ==
According to 2001 census, Balsas has 60,613 inhabitants. 82.73% live in Urban areas. The infant mortality rate is 35.1 deaths /1,000 live births and life expectancy is 64.1 years.

The annual median growth of the population is 4.21%. In 2007 the population was over 78,000 inhabitants. The city is the seat of the Roman Catholic Diocese of Balsas.

== Notable people ==
- Manoel Gomes, singer
