= Corda River =

Location
- Country: Brazil

Physical characteristics
- Source
  - location: Maranhão state
- Mouth: Mearim River
  - coordinates: 5°30′S 45°15′W

The Corda River is a river of Maranhão state in northeastern Brazil.

== See also ==
- List of rivers of Maranhão
