= Babassu oil =

Vegetable oil from the seeds of the babassu palm

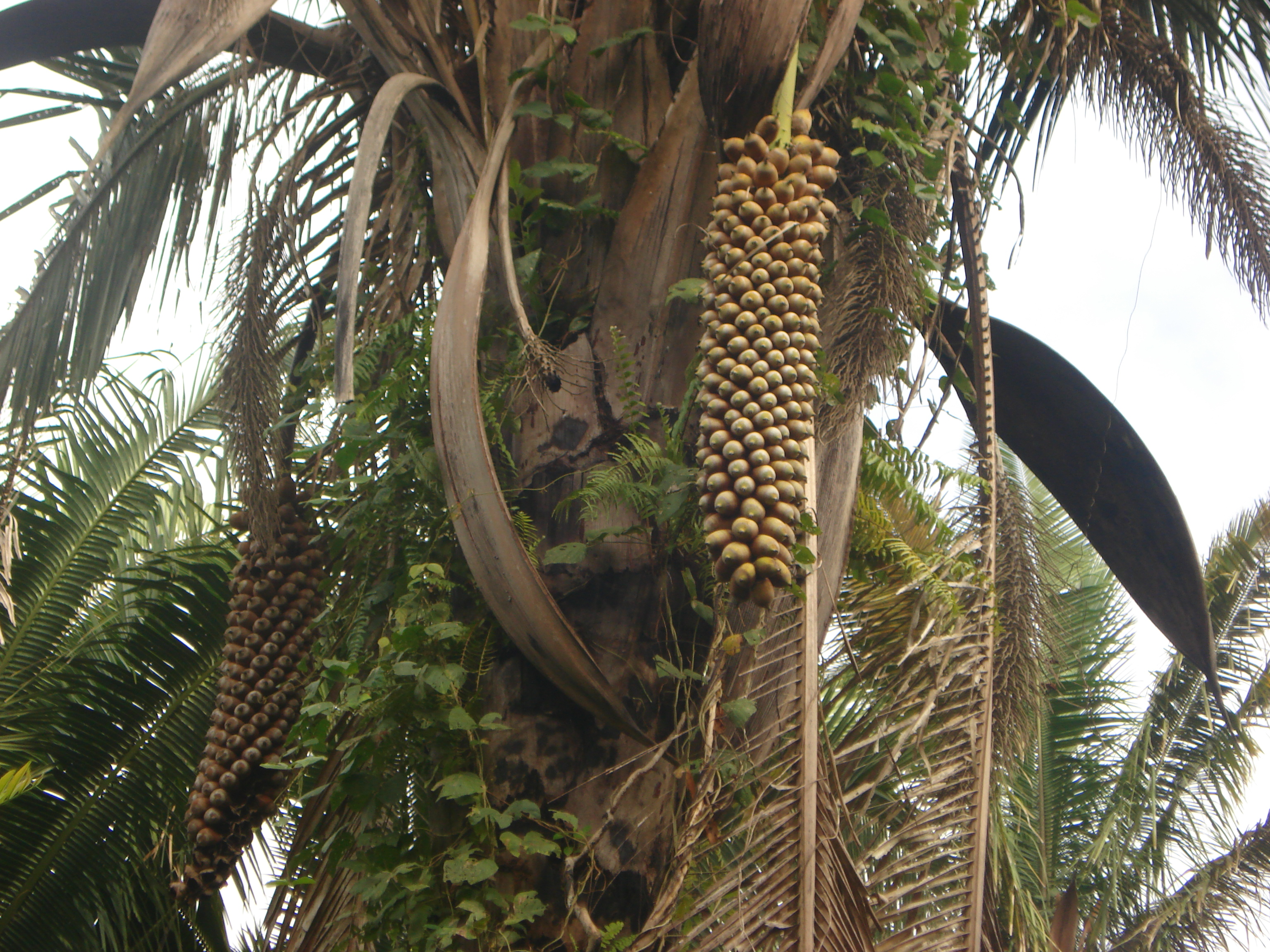
Fruit-bearing babassu palm

Babassu oil or cusi oil is a clear light yellow vegetable oil extracted from the seeds of the babassu palm (Attalea speciosa) which grows in the Amazon region of South America. It is a non-drying oil used in food, cleaners and skin products. This oil has properties similar to coconut oil and is increasingly being used as a substitute for coconut oil. Babassu oil is about 70% lipids, in the following proportions:

Fatty acid	Percentage
Lauric	50.0%
Myristic	20.0%
Palmitic	11.0%
Oleic	10.0%
Stearic	3.5%

Lauric and myristic acids have melting points relatively close to human body temperature, so babassu oil can be applied to the skin as a solid that melts on contact. This heat transfer can produce a cooling sensation. It is an effective emollient.

In Maranhão, the women who produce babassu oil are known as quebradeiras de coco do babaçu, '(babassu coconut breakers)' and have been studied by academics for their role in conserving biodiversity.

During February 2008, a mixture of babassu oil and coconut oil was used to partially power one engine of a Boeing 747, in a biofuel trial sponsored by Virgin Atlantic.
