= Santana River (Maranhão) =

Location
- Country: Brazil

Physical characteristics
- Source
  - location: Maranhão state
- Mouth: Grajaú River
  - coordinates: 5°34′S 46°13′W

The Santana River is a river of Maranhão state in northeastern Brazil.

== See also ==
- List of rivers of Maranhão
