= Água Quente River =

Água Quente River may refer to:

- Água Quente River (Maranhão), Brazil
- Água Quente River (Paraná), Brazil
