= Tapuio River =

River in Maranhão, Brazil

Location
- Country: Brazil

Physical characteristics
- Source
  - location: Maranhão state
- Mouth: Peritoró River
  - coordinates: 3°46′S 44°17′W

The Tapuio River is a river of Maranhão state in northeastern Brazil.

== See also ==
- List of rivers of Maranhão
