= Das Almas River (Maranhão) =

Location
- Country: Brazil
- State: Maranhão

Physical characteristics
- Mouth: Turiaçu River
  - coordinates: 1°55′S 45°9′W
- Length: 310 km (190 mi)

The Das Almas River is a river of Maranhão state in northeastern Brazil.

== See also ==
- List of rivers of Maranhão
