= Bacurí =

Bacurí may refer to:

- Platonia insignis, a tree species
- Bacuri (Maranhão), a municipality in the state of Maranhão in the Northeast region of Brazil
- Bacuri River, a river of Maranhão state in northeastern Brazil
