= Saco River (Maranhão) =

Location
- Country: Brazil

Physical characteristics
- Source
  - location: Maranhão state
- Mouth: Codòzinho River
  - coordinates: 4°31′S 43°56′W

The Saco River is a river of Maranhão state in northeastern Brazil.

== See also ==
- List of rivers of Maranhão
