= Paraná River (Maranhão) =

Location
- Country: Brazil

Physical characteristics
- Source
  - location: Maranhão state
- Mouth: Turiaçu River
  - coordinates: 2°20′S 45°30′W

The Paraná River is a river of Maranhão state in northeastern Brazil.

== See also ==
- List of rivers of Maranhão
