= Lagoa Grande =

Lagoa Grande may refer to the following places in Brazil:

- Lagoa Grande (Carira), Sergipe
- Lagoa Grande, Minas Gerais
- Lagoa Grande, Pernambuco
- Lagoa Grande do Maranhão, Maranhão
