= Lajeado =

Lajeado may refer to:

== Places in Brazil ==
- Lajeado, Tocantins
- Lajeado, Rio Grande do Sul
- Lajeado (district of São Paulo)
- Lajeado Grande
- Lajeado Novo
- Lajeado do Bugre

== Rivers in Brazil ==
- Lajeado Agudo
- Lajeado Grande River (disambiguation)
- Lajeado Macuco River
- Lajeado River (disambiguation)
