= Caxias =

Caxias may refer to:

== Places ==
=== Brazil ===
- Caxias do Sul, Rio Grande do Sul
- Caxias (Maranhão)
- Duque de Caxias, Rio de Janeiro
- Caxias River, a river of Maranhão state in northeastern Brazil

=== Portugal ===
- Caxias, Oeiras

=== Mars ===
- Caxias (crater), a Martian impact crater

== Football clubs ==
- Sociedade Esportiva e Recreativa Caxias do Sul, a Brazilian football (soccer) club from Caxias do Sul, Rio Grande do Sul
- Caxias Futebol Clube, a Brazilian football (soccer) club from Joinville, Santa Catarina
- Duque de Caxias Futebol Clube, a Brazilian football (soccer) club from Duque de Caxias, Rio de Janeiro
- CEPE-Caxias, a Brazilian women's football team, from Duque de Caxias, Rio de Janeiro state

== See also ==
- Luís Alves de Lima e Silva, Duke of Caxias (1803–1880), Brazilian military leader, nobleman and statesman
