= Gameleira River =

Location
- Country: Brazil

Physical characteristics
- Source
  - location: Maranhão state
- Mouth: Itapecuru River
  - coordinates: 4°30′S 43°44′W

The Gameleira River is a river of Maranhão state in northeastern Brazil.

== See also ==
- List of rivers of Maranhão
