= Farinha River =

Coordinates: 6°50′18″S 47°31′07″W

Location
- Country: Brazil

Physical characteristics
- Source
  - location: Maranhão state

The Farinha River is a river of Maranhão state in northeastern Brazil.

== See also ==
- List of rivers of Maranhão
