= Mirador State Park =

State park in Maranhão, Brazil

- Parque Estadual de Mirador
- IUCN category II (national park)
- Location within Brazil
- Nearest city: Mirador, Maranhão
- Coordinates: 6°34′51″S 45°11′41″W
- Area: 437,000 hectares (1,080,000 acres)
- Designation: State park
- Created: 4 June 1980
- Administrator: Secretaria de Estado de Meio Ambiente e Recursos Naturais

The Mirador State Park (Portuguese: Parque Estadual de Mirador) is a state park in the state of Maranhão, Brazil. It protects the headwaters of an important source of water for communities in the state, including the state capital. Its own protection from illegal logging, slash-and-burning, grazing and hunting is underfunded.

== Location ==
The Mirador State Park is in the municipality of Mirador, Maranhão. It has an area of about 437,000 hectares (1,080,000 acres). The park covers the Serra do Itapecuru, which rises to 660 metres (2,170 ft) between the basins of the Alpercatas and Itapecuru rivers. It protects the watershed and headwaters of several tributaries of the upper Itapecuru, an important source of water for twenty cities in Maranhão including São Luís.

== Environment ==
The climate is dry, subhumid, with annual rainfall of 1,200 millimetres (47 in). Average maximum temperatures are 31.4 to 33 °C (88.5 to 91.4 °F). Average minimum temperatures are 19.5 to 21 °C (67.1 to 69.8 °F). Vegetation is mainly cerrado, cerradão and gallery forest. A 2013 survey of flora found 53 families, 98 genera and 140 species. The families with the greatest number of species were Malpighiaceae, Leguminosae, Rubiaceae, Cyperaceae, Convolvulaceae, Melastomataceae, Malvaceae, Vochysiaceae and Dilleniaceae.

Trees include red and yellow ipê (Tabebuia), arueira and cedar. Vegetation is low, gnarled trees with thick bark. Economically important trees include pau-terra (Vochysiaceae), pequi (Caryocar brasiliense), lobeira (Solanum lycocarpum), ainda, bacuri, pequi and murici for fruit, and the medicinal sucupira (Pterodon emarginatus) and jatobá (Hymenaea courbaril). The fava-danta (Dimorphandra mollis), common in the park, is the source of the alkaloid pilocarpine for the pharmaceutical industry. Most of the riparian trees are large buriti palms.

Fauna includes endangered species such as the king vulture (Sarcoramphus papa), giant armadillo (Priodontes maximus) and bush dog (Speothos venaticus). Other species include Amazon parrots, parakeets, partridges, seriemas, margay (Leopardus wiedii), deer, cobras and armadillos. Reptiles include the anaconda, the alligator and rattlesnake. Researchers have identified 60 species of fish, one apparently a new species.

The park attracts illegal fishing and hunting, burning and logging. Some of the original residents remain. They use the area for grazing and small-scale crops. In August 2015 the deputy Rigo Teles spoke out in the State Assembly about the environmental degradation of the state park, which he had recently visited. He said that after the cooperative stopped managing the park there had been widespread fires and the wild animals were being decimated by hunters.

== History ==
The Mirador State Park was created by decree 7.641 of 4 June 1980 on state-owned land to protect the river sources. The park was limited to the Mirador municipality, so the surrounding municipalities had no commitment to preserving the rivers. Administration is the responsibility of a department of the State Secretariat of Environment and Natural Resources (SEMA), which outsources the work to a cooperative. Often the contract is not renewed for months or years, and there is no monitoring of results. For most of the first thirty years the park therefore existed only on paper, and the potential for scientific research and ecotourism was not realised. SEMA announced the start of preparation of a management plan, including a full study of the ecosystem and detailed plans to preserve it, but for many years no work was done.

The decree creating the park was adjusted by law 8.959 of 8 May 2009. On 23 November 2009 it SEMA announced that it would spend R$500,000 to prepare a management plan, starting with a biotic diagnosis lasting from 8 months to a year. This would be the basis for defining zoning of the park and the objectives for each area. 18 biologists, 11 researchers and 10 coordinators would be involved, provided by various universities.

Law 9.316 of 23 December 2010 recognised the Cooperativa dos Técnicos em Proteção Ambientaldo Parque Estadual de Mirador as providing a public service in managing the park. At the end 2012 the municipality of Mirador passed a law that allowed it to take more responsibility for the environment of the municipality, assuming some activities from the federal and state governments, including joint management of the state park. The municipality felt it would be better able to use available funding to preserve the park. As of mid-2015 there were no rangers assigned to the park.

In January 2016 the State Government announced that it would hold public hearings in Mirador on the condition of the park to address the demand of the vice-prefect of the city, José Ronilde Pereira de Sousa ("Rony") to fight environmental degradation due to fires and poaching. In June 2016 technicians from the responsible SEMA department, with members of the environmental police and the fire department, visited communities in the park and surrounding villages to explain the importance of avoiding environmental damage. Most of the locals were engaged in cassava farming, raising some pigs and cattle that graze in the park. Residents suspected of having chainsaws in their houses were disciplined, and two guns were seized.

== Sources ==
- Audiência pública debaterá situação do Parque Estadual do Mirador (in Portuguese), Governo do Maranhão, 25 January 2016
- Emanoel Pascoal (7 June 2013), Pesquisa identifica novas espécies de peixes no Parque Estadual do Mirador, FAPEMA: Fundação de Amparo à Pesquisa e ao Desenvolvimento Científico e Tecnológico do Maranhão, archived from the original on 26 August 2016
- Luis Cardoso (19 August 2015), Rigo Teles denuncia destruição do Parque Estadual do Mirador (in Portuguese)
- Mendes da Conceição, Gonçalo; Santos Rodrigues, Maira dos (January–June 2014), "Diversidade florística das diferentes fisionomias de cerrado do Parque Estadual do Mirador, Maranhão, Brasil", Brazilian Geographical Journal: Geosciences and Humanities research medium (in Portuguese), 5 (1), Ituiutaba
- Parque Estadual do Mirador recebe força-tarefa para fiscalização e prevenção de crimes ambientais (in Portuguese), 5 July 2016
- "Parque Estadual de Mirador: Proposta de gestão compartilhada", Jornal de Mirador (in Portuguese)
- PES de Mirador (in Portuguese), ISA: Instituto Socioambiental
- SEMA lanca plano de manejo do Parque Estadual do Mirador (in Portuguese), SEMA, 29 November 2009
