= Alpercatas River =

- Location within Brazil
- Native name: Rio Alpercatas (Portuguese)

Location
- Country: Brazil

Physical characteristics
- Source
  - location: Maranhão state
- Mouth
  - coordinates: 6.029736°S 44.311702°W

Basin features
- River system: Itapecuru River

The Alpercatas River is a river of Maranhão state in northeastern Brazil. It is a tributary of the Itapecuru River.

Some of the headwaters of the river are protected by the 437,000 hectares (1,080,000 acres) Mirador State Park, created in 1980.

== See also ==
- List of rivers of Maranhão
