= Sereno River =

Location
- Country: Brazil

Physical characteristics
- Source
  - location: Maranhão state
- Mouth: Manuel Alves Grande River
  - coordinates: 7°40′S 47°20′W

The Sereno River is a river of Maranhão state in northeastern Brazil.

== See also ==
- List of rivers of Maranhão
