= Aurá River =

River in Maranhão, Brazil

Location
- Country: Brazil

Physical characteristics
- Source
  - location: Maranhão state
- Mouth: Atlantic Ocean
  - coordinates: 2°32′S 44°32′W

The Aurá River is located in Maranhão, northeastern Brazil.

== See also ==
- List of rivers of Maranhão
