= Peritoró River =

Location
- Country: Brazil

Physical characteristics
- Source
  - location: Maranhão state
- Mouth: Itapecuru River
  - coordinates: 3°47′S 44°16′W

The Peritoró River is a river of Maranhão state in northeastern Brazil.

== See also ==
- List of rivers of Maranhão
