= Maracacumé River =

Location
- Country: Brazil

Physical characteristics
- Source
  - location: Maranhão state
- Mouth: Atlantic Ocean
  - coordinates: 1°31′S 45°47′W

The Maracacumé River is a river of Maranhão state in northeastern Brazil.

== See also ==
- List of rivers of Maranhão
