= Axuí River =

Location
- Country: Brazil

Physical characteristics
- Source
  - location: Maranhão state
- Mouth: Atlantic Ocean
  - coordinates: 2°36′S 43°37′W

The Axuí River is a river of Maranhão state in northeastern Brazil.

== See also ==
- List of rivers of Maranhão
