= Balseira River =

Coordinates: 5°51′S 43°44′W

Location
- Country: Brazil

Physical characteristics
- Source
  - location: Maranhão state

The Balseira River is a river of Maranhão state in northeastern Brazil.

== See also ==
- List of rivers of Maranhão
