= Enjeitado River =

Coordinates: 5°46′S 45°42′W

Location
- Country: Brazil

Physical characteristics
- Source
  - location: Maranhão state
- Mouth
  - location: Mearim River

The Enjeitado River is a river of Maranhão state in northeastern Brazil.

== See also ==
- List of rivers of Maranhão
