= Itaxueiras River =

Location
- Country: Brazil

Physical characteristics
- Source
  - location: Maranhão state
- Mouth: Tocantins River
  - coordinates: 6°30′S 47°25′W

Itaxueiras River (Brazil)

The Itaxueiras River is a river of Maranhão state in northeastern Brazil. Itaxueiras river is in the basin of Tocantins river. It also a branch of this river.

== See also ==
- List of rivers of Maranhão
