= Zutia River =

Location
- Country: Brazil

Physical characteristics
- Source
  - location: Maranhão state
- Mouth: Pindaré River
  - coordinates: 3°41′S 45°29′W

The Zutia River is a river of Maranhão state in northeastern Brazil.

== See also ==
- List of rivers of Maranhão
