= Cajuapara River =

Location
- Country: Brazil

Physical characteristics
- Source
  - location: Maranhão state
- Mouth: Gurupí River
  - coordinates: 4°17′S 47°25′W

The Cajuapara River, also known as the Açailândia River, is a river of Maranhão state in northeastern Brazil. It joins with the Itinga River to form the Gurupí River, on the border with Pará state.

== See also ==
- List of rivers of Maranhão
