= Barro Duro River =

Location
- Country: Brazil

Physical characteristics
- Source
  - location: Santana do Maranhão - MA
- Mouth: Atlantic Ocean
  - coordinates: 2°51′S 42°15′W

The Barro Duro River is a river of Maranhão state in northeastern Brazil.

It is located on the left bank of the Parnaíba River branch known as Barra de Tutoya, about 18 kilometres (11 mi) from the sea. Coroatá Island lies opposite it.

== See also ==
- List of rivers of Maranhão
