= Itapecuruzinho River =

Coordinates: 4°56′S 43°21′W

Location
- Country: Brazil

Physical characteristics
- Source
  - location: Maranhão state

The Itapecuruzinho River is a river of Maranhão state in northeastern Brazil.

== See also ==
- List of rivers of Maranhão
