= Macaxeira River =

Coordinates: 1°48′01″S 45°52′23″W

Location
- Country: Brazil

Physical characteristics
- Source
  - location: Maranhão state

The Macaxeira River is a river of Maranhão state in northeastern Brazil.

== See also ==
- List of rivers of Maranhão
