= Chapadinha =

- Municipality
- Flag

- Location in Maranhão state

- Location in Brazil
- Coordinates: 03°44′31″S 43°21′36″W
- Country: Brazil
- Region: Northeast
- State: Maranhão

Area
  - Total: 3,247 km^{2} (1,254 sq mi)

Population (2020)
  - Total: 80,195
  - Density: 24.70/km^{2} (63.97/sq mi)
- Time zone: UTC−3 (BRT)

Chapadinha is a Brazilian municipality in the state of Maranhão. It is located 235 km south-east of the state capital São Luís. The population is 80,195 (2020) and the total area is 3,247 km^{2}.

The municipality lies in the Munim River basin. The municipality contains the 11,971 hectares (29,580 acres) Chapada Limpa Extractive Reserve, created in 2007.

== Climate ==
Chapadinha experiences a tropical savanna climate (Köppen: Aw) with hot temperatures and distinct wet and dry seasons. The city experiences a wet season from January to May. The dry season extends from July to November.

Climate data for Chapadinha (1991–2020)
Month	Jan	Feb	Mar	Apr	May	Jun	Jul	Aug	Sep	Oct	Nov	Dec	Year
Mean daily maximum °C (°F)	32.8 (91.0)	32.0 (89.6)	31.7 (89.1)	31.7 (89.1)	31.8 (89.2)	31.7 (89.1)	32.3 (90.1)	34.1 (93.4)	35.6 (96.1)	36.3 (97.3)	35.8 (96.4)	34.9 (94.8)	33.4 (92.1)
Daily mean °C (°F)	26.8 (80.2)	26.4 (79.5)	26.2 (79.2)	26.4 (79.5)	26.8 (80.2)	26.7 (80.1)	26.8 (80.2)	27.3 (81.1)	28.1 (82.6)	28.5 (83.3)	28.5 (83.3)	28.0 (82.4)	27.2 (81.0)
Mean daily minimum °C (°F)	23.1 (73.6)	23.0 (73.4)	23.0 (73.4)	23.2 (73.8)	23.3 (73.9)	22.8 (73.0)	22.3 (72.1)	22.4 (72.3)	22.9 (73.2)	23.3 (73.9)	23.7 (74.7)	23.7 (74.7)	23.1 (73.6)
Average precipitation mm (inches)	227.7 (8.96)	275.1 (10.83)	359.1 (14.14)	331.7 (13.06)	196.5 (7.74)	69.3 (2.73)	27.0 (1.06)	5.9 (0.23)	2.5 (0.10)	16.6 (0.65)	38.3 (1.51)	84.3 (3.32)	1,634 (64.33)
Average precipitation days (≥ 1.0 mm)	12.7	15.1	19.4	18.4	12.6	6.5	3.2	0.6	0.6	1.1	2.2	5.1	97.5
Average relative humidity (%)	78.0	82.5	85.3	85.8	82.7	78.0	72.6	66.3	63.3	62.4	64.3	68.1	74.1
Average dew point °C (°F)	23.1 (73.6)	23.6 (74.5)	23.9 (75.0)	24.1 (75.4)	24.0 (75.2)	23.1 (73.6)	22.1 (71.8)	21.4 (70.5)	21.2 (70.2)	21.3 (70.3)	21.7 (71.1)	22.2 (72.0)	22.6 (72.7)
Mean monthly sunshine hours	190.7	169.5	174.9	180.5	221.6	250.6	276.5	305.0	292.7	282.0	243.6	230.4	2,818
Source: NOAA
