= Pirapemas River =

Coordinates: 3°43′18″S 44°12′21″W

Location
- Country: Brazil

Physical characteristics
- Source
  - location: Maranhão state

The Pirapemas River is a river of Maranhão state in northeastern Brazil.

== See also ==
- List of rivers of Maranhão
