= Medonho River =

Coordinates: 8°58′43″S 45°58′04″W

Location
- Country: Brazil

Physical characteristics
- Source
  - location: Maranhão state

The Medonho River is a river of Maranhão state in northeastern Brazil.

== See also ==
- List of rivers of Maranhão
