= Mirador, Maranhão =

Coordinates: 6.37083°S 44.3628°W

Mirador
- Municipality
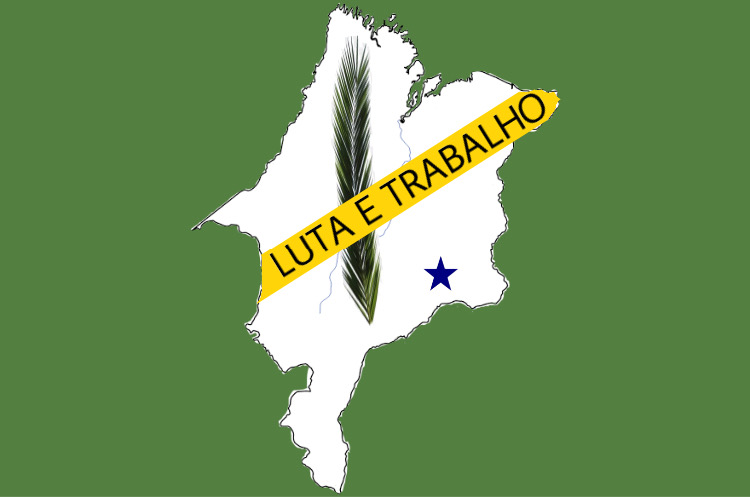
- Flag Coat of arms

- Location in Maranhão
- Country: Brazil
- Region: Nordeste
- State: Maranhão
- Mesoregion: Leste Maranhense

Population (2020)
  - Total: 21,031
- Time zone: UTC−3 (BRT)

Mirador is a municipality in the state of Maranhão in the Northeast region of Brazil.

It contains the 500,000-hectare (1,200,000-acre) Mirador State Park, created in 1980.

== See also ==
- List of municipalities in Maranhão
