= Pacuma River =

Coordinates: 5°29′S 43°53′W

Location
- Country: Brazil

Physical characteristics
- Source
  - location: Maranhão state

The Pacuma River is a river of Maranhão state in northeastern Brazil.

== See also ==
- List of rivers of Maranhão
