= Parnaìbinha River =

Coordinates: 9°17′30″S 45°54′26″W

Location
- Country: Brazil

Physical characteristics
- Source
  - location: Maranhão state

The Parnaìbinha River is a river of Maranhão state in northeastern Brazil.

== See also ==
- List of rivers of Maranhão
