= Lajeado Grande River =

Lajeado Grande River may refer to one of these rivers in the state of Rio Grande do Sul, Brazil:

- Lajeado Grande River (Das Antas River)
