= Esperantinópolis =

Coordinates: 4°53′S 44°53′W

- Municipality
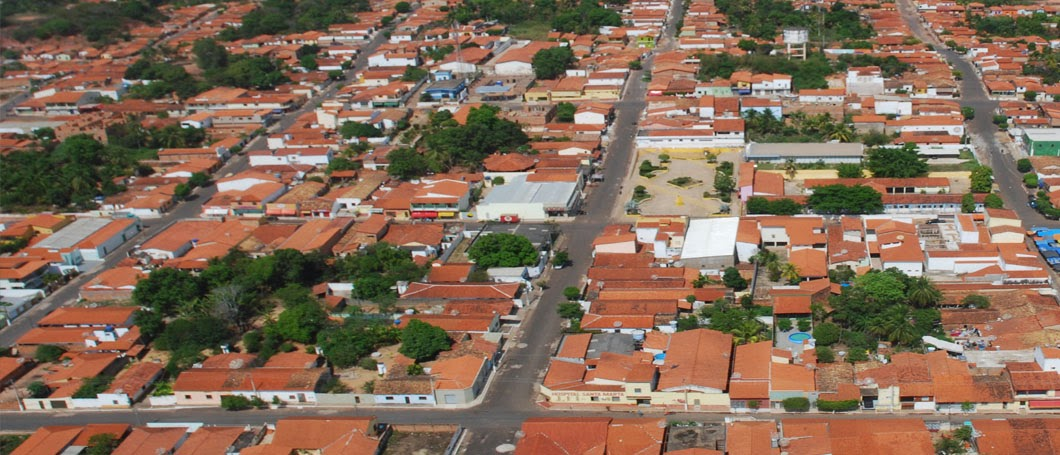

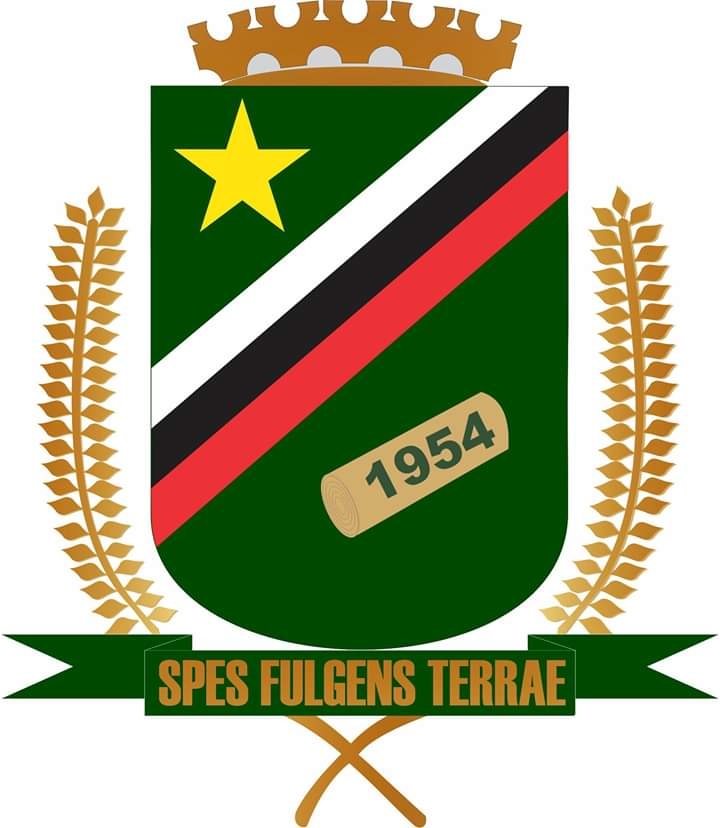
- Flag Coat of arms
- Interactive map of Esperantinópolis
- Country: Brazil
- Region: Nordeste
- State: Maranhão
- Mesoregion: Centro Maranhense

Population (2020)
  - Total: 17,104
- Time zone: UTC−3 (BRT)

Esperantinópolis is a municipality in the state of Maranhão in the northeast of Brazil.

== See also ==
- List of municipalities in Maranhão
