= Preguiças River =

Coordinates: 2°33′25″S 42°44′52″W

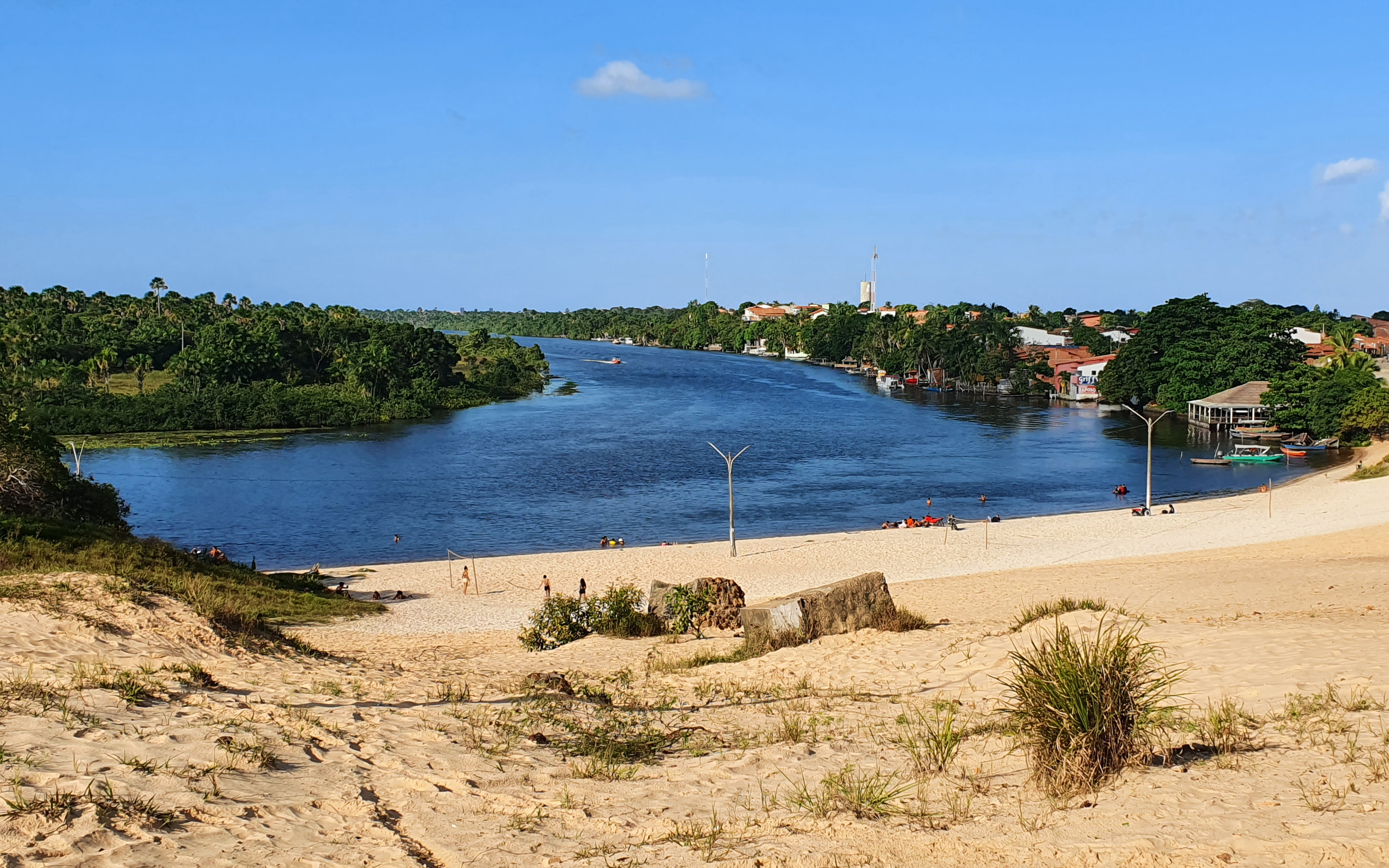

Location
- Country: Brazil

Physical characteristics
- Source
  - location: Maranhão state

The Preguiças River is a river of Maranhão state in northeastern Brazil.

== See also ==
- List of rivers of Maranhão
