= Preto River (Maranhão) =

Location
- Country: Brazil

Physical characteristics
- Source
  - location: Maranhão state
- Mouth: Munim River
  - coordinates: 3°32′S 43°46′W

The Preto River is a river of Maranhão state in northeastern Brazil.

== See also ==
- List of rivers of Maranhão
