= Lajeado River (Maranhão) =

Location
- Country: Brazil

Physical characteristics
- Source
  - location: Maranhão state
- Mouth: Tocantins River
  - coordinates: 6°5′S 47°25′W

The Lajeado River is a river of Maranhão state in northeastern Brazil.

== See also ==
- List of rivers of Maranhão
