= Grajaú River (Maranhão) =

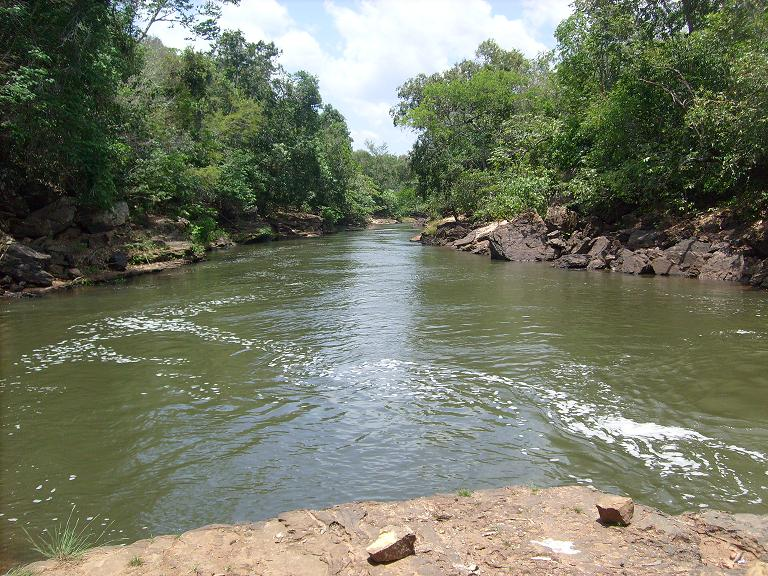

Location
- Country: Brazil

Physical characteristics
- Source
  - location: Maranhão state
- Mouth: Mearim River
  - coordinates: 3°41′S 44°48′W

The Grajaú River (Brazilian Portuguese pronunciation: [ɡɾaʒaˈu]) is a river of Maranhão state indo 09p9 northeastern Brazil. It is a tributary of the Mearim River.

== See also ==
- List of rivers of Maranhão
