= Água Quente River (Maranhão) =

Location
- Country: Brazil

Physical characteristics
- Source
  - location: Maranhão state
- Mouth: Parnaíba River
  - coordinates: 9°56′S 45°50′W

The Água Quente River is a river on the borders of Maranhão and Piauí states in northeastern Brazil.

== See also ==
- List of rivers of Maranhão
