= Lima Campos =

Coordinates: 6°25′S 38°57′W

- Municipality
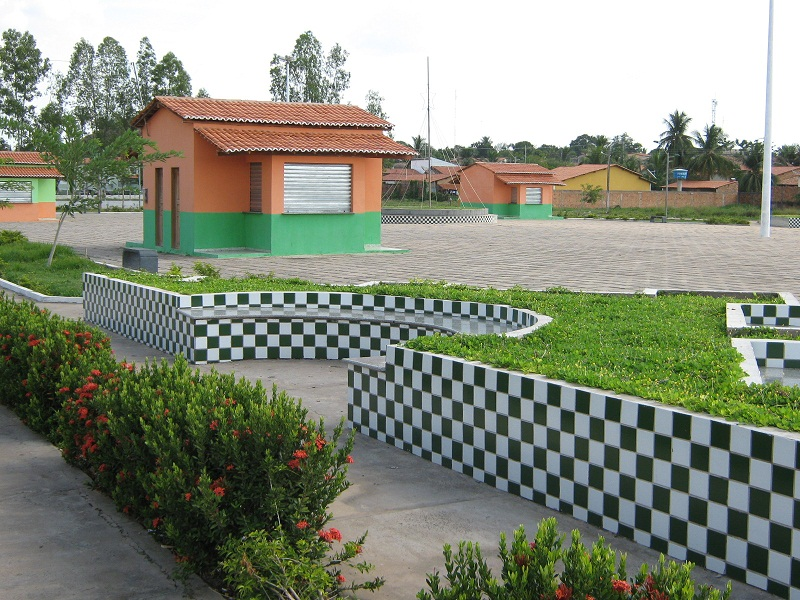

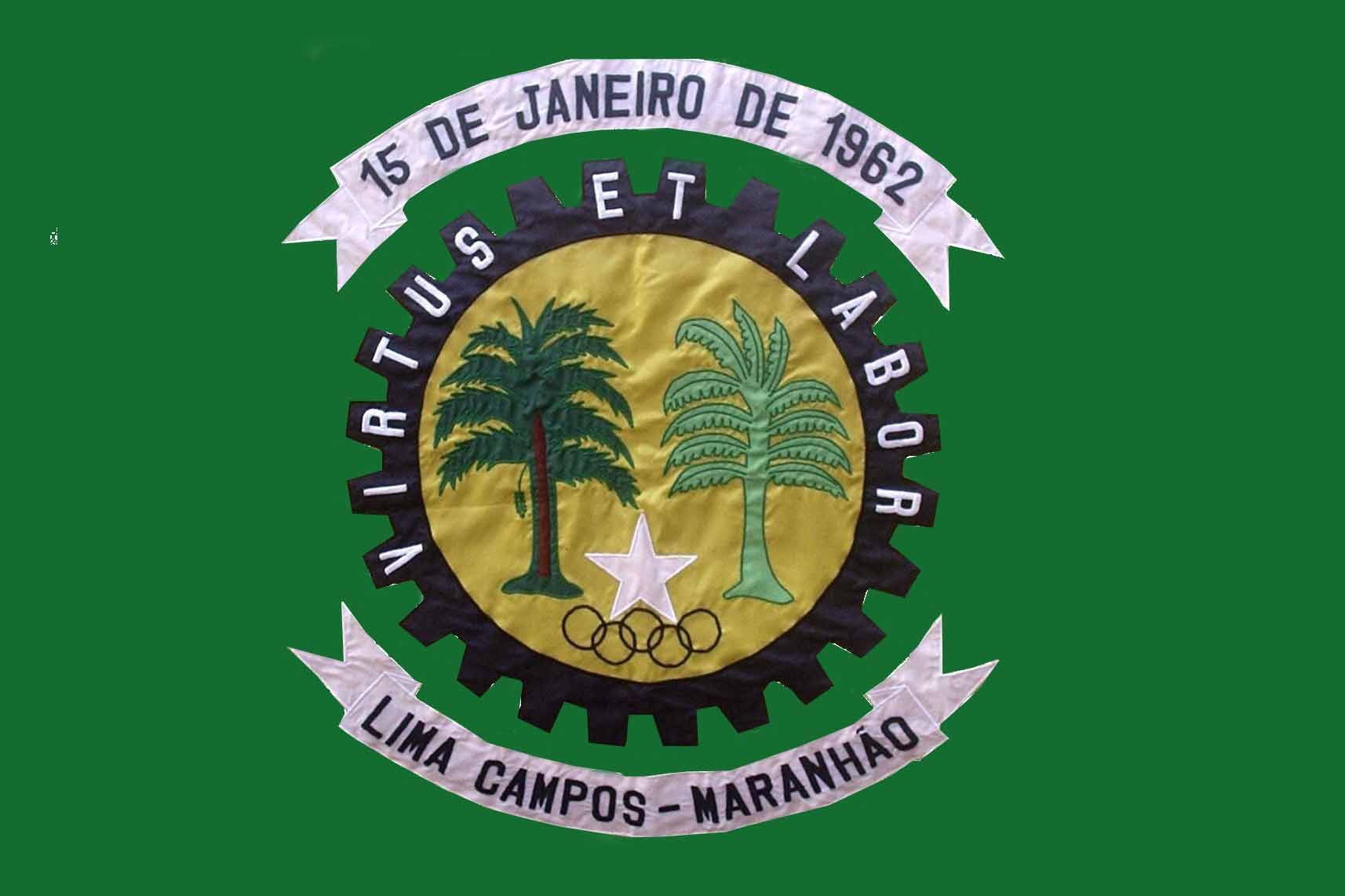
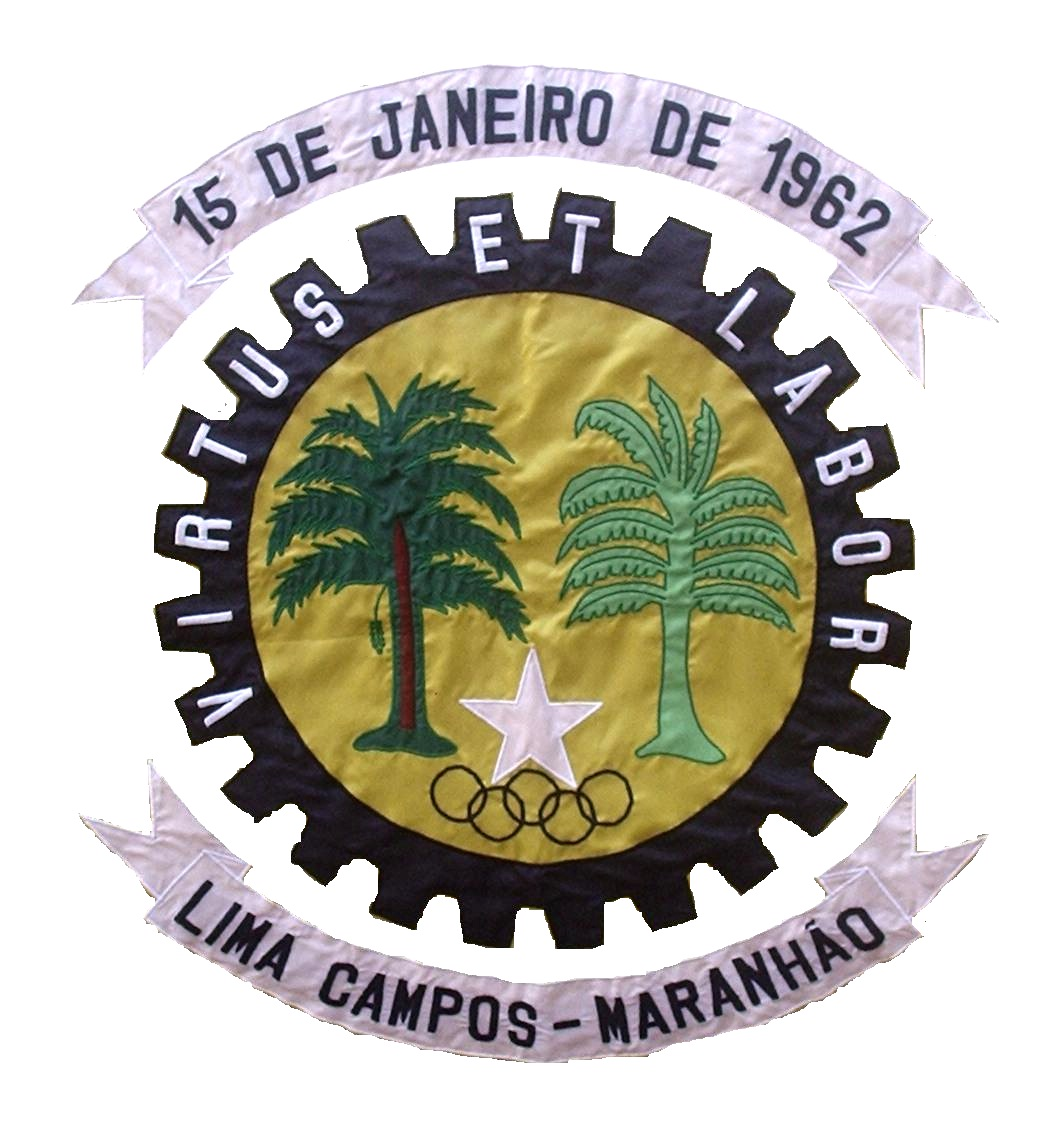
- Flag Coat of arms
- Interactive map of Lima Campos
- Country: Brazil
- Region: Nordeste
- State: Maranhão
- Mesoregion: Centro Maranhense

Population (2020)
  - Total: 11,918
- Time zone: UTC−3 (BRT)

Lima Campos is a municipality in the state of Maranhão in the Northeast region of Brazil.

== See also ==
- List of municipalities in Maranhão

== links ==
instagram
