= Das Balsas River (Maranhão) =

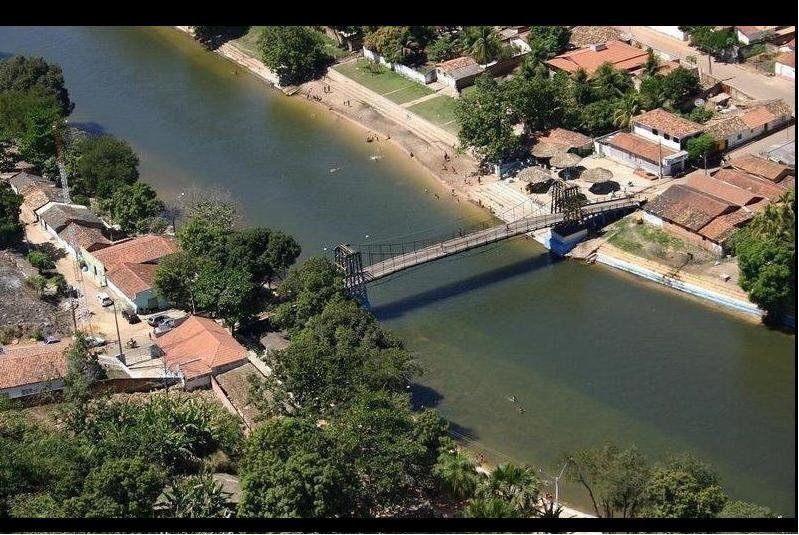

Location
- Country: Brazil

Physical characteristics
- Source
  - location: Maranhão state
- Mouth: Parnaíba River
  - coordinates: 7°14′S 44°37′W

The Das Balsas River is a river in Maranhão, Brazil.

== See also ==
- List of rivers of Maranhão
