= Periá River =

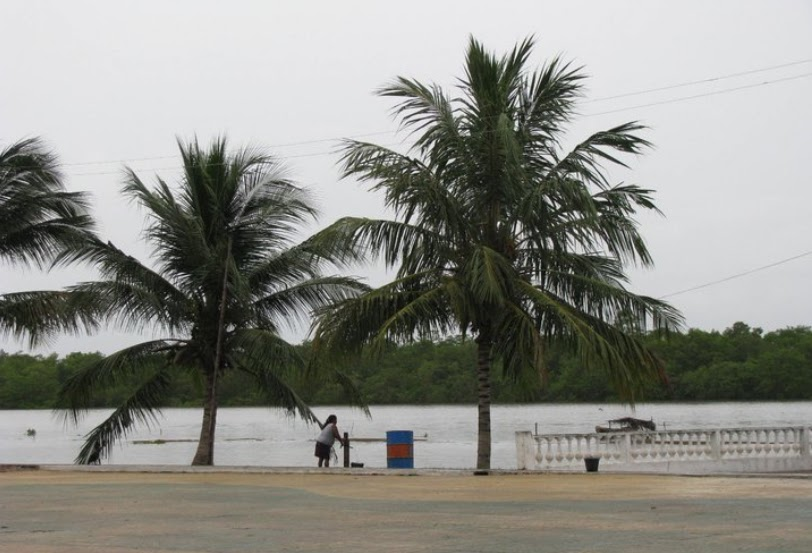

Location
- Country: Brazil

Physical characteristics
- Source
  - location: Maranhão state
- Mouth: Atlantic Ocean
  - coordinates: 2°37′S 43°27′W

The Periá River is a river of Maranhão state in northeastern Brazil. It flows into the Atlantic Ocean at the border between Humberto de Campos and Primeira Cruz municipalities.

== See also ==
- List of rivers of Maranhão
