= Cidelândia =

Coordinates: 5.17389°S 47.7819°W

- Municipality
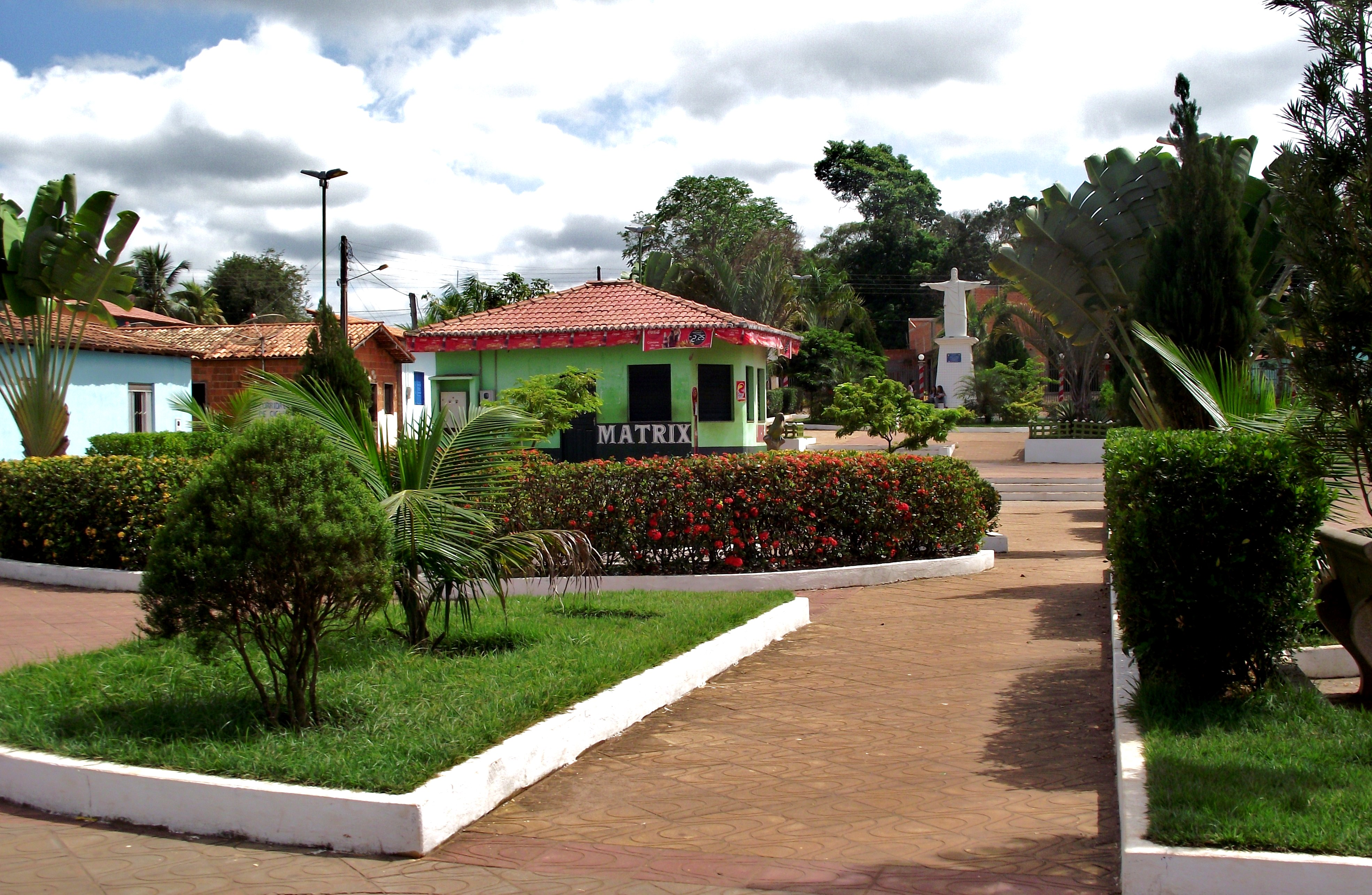

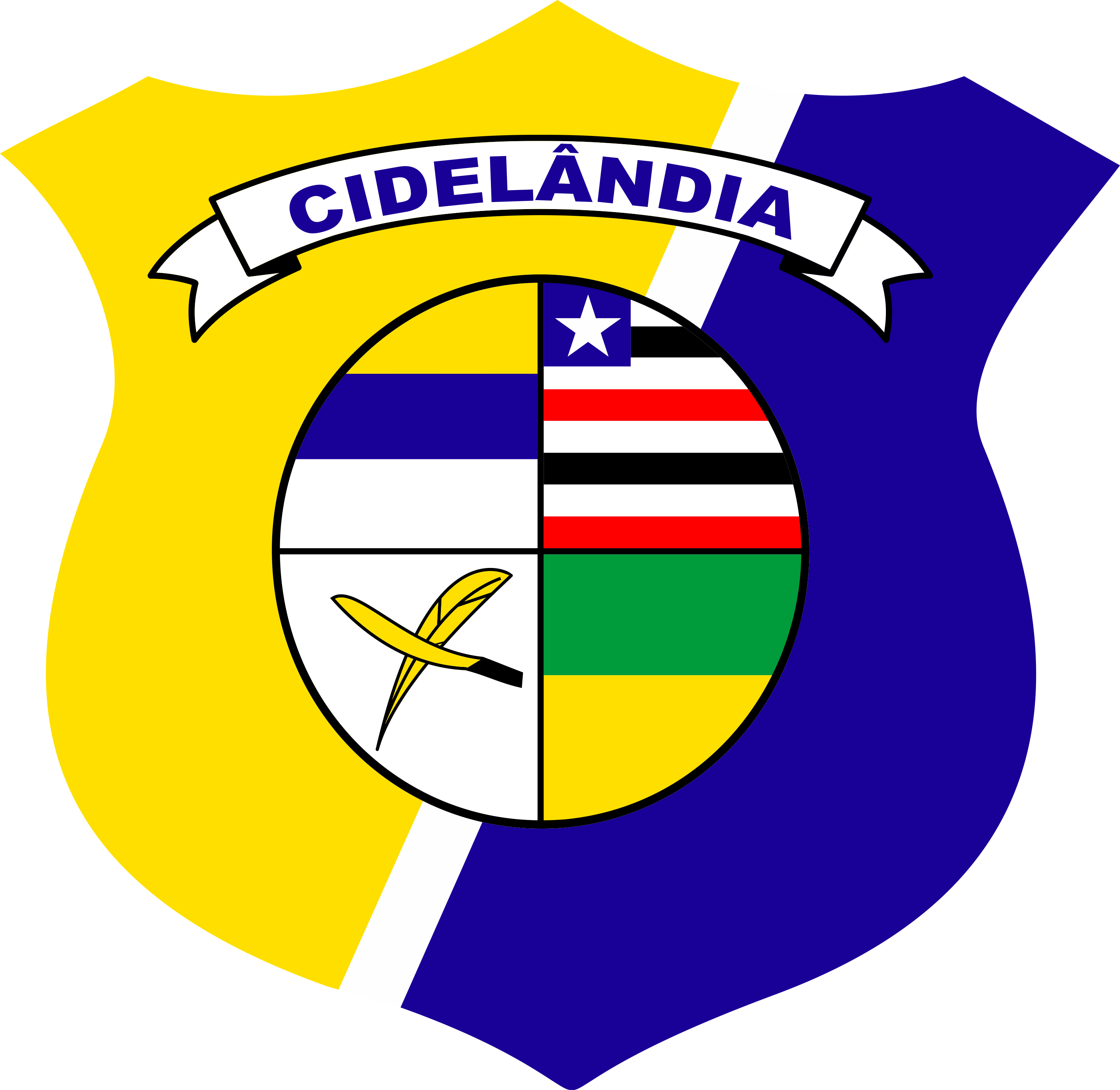
- Flag Coat of arms
- Interactive map of Cidelândia
- Country: Brazil
- Region: Nordeste
- State: Maranhão
- Mesoregion: Oeste Maranhense

Population (2020)
  - Total: 14,777
- Time zone: UTC−3 (BRT)

Cidelândia is a municipality in the state of Maranhão in the Northeast region of Brazil.

== See also ==
- List of municipalities in Maranhão
