= Caxias River =

River in Maranhão, Brazil

Coordinates: 1°51′48″S 45°13′25″W

Location
- Country: Brazil

Physical characteristics
- Source
  - location: Maranhão state

The Caxias River is a river of Maranhão state in northeastern Brazil.

== See also ==
- List of rivers of Maranhão
