= São José dos Basílios =

Coordinates: 5.05083°S 44.5839°W

- Municipality
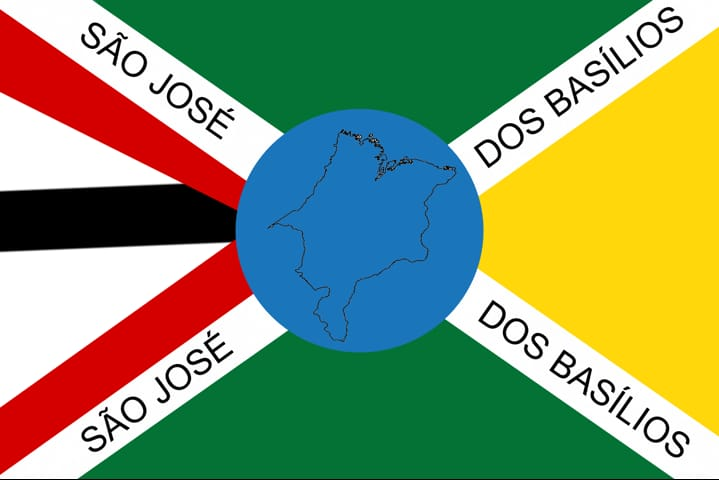
- Flag
- Interactive map of São José dos Basílios
- Country: Brazil
- Region: Nordeste
- State: Maranhão
- Mesoregion: Centro Maranhense

Area
  - Total: 140 sq mi (363 km^{2})

Population (2020)
  - Total: 7,640
- Time zone: UTC−3 (BRT)

São José dos Basílios is a municipality in the state of Maranhão in the Northeast region of Brazil.

== See also ==
- List of municipalities in Maranhão
