= Iguará River =

Coordinates: 3°24′S 43°54′W

Location
- Country: Brazil

Physical characteristics
- Source
  - location: Maranhão state

The Iguará River is a river of Maranhão state in northeastern Brazil.

== See also ==
- List of rivers of Maranhão
