= Lagoa Grande do Maranhão =

Coordinates: 4.81278°S 45.33°W

- Municipality
- Interactive map of Lagoa Grande do Maranhão
- Country: Brazil
- Region: Nordeste
- State: Maranhão
- Mesoregion: Oeste Maranhense

Population (2020)
  - Total: 11,464
- Time zone: UTC−3 (BRT)

Lagoa Grande do Maranhão is a municipality in the state of Maranhão in the Northeast region of Brazil.

== See also ==
- List of municipalities in Maranhão
