= Lago dos Rodrigues =

Coordinates: 4.60889°S 44.98°W

- Municipality
- Interactive map of Lago dos Rodrigues
- Country: Brazil
- Region: Nordeste
- State: Maranhão
- Mesoregion: Centro Maranhense

Population (2020)
  - Total: 8,857
- Time zone: UTC−3 (BRT)

Lago dos Rodrigues is a second-order municipality in the state of Maranhão in the Northeast region of Brazil.

== See also ==
- List of municipalities in Maranhão
