= Turiaçu River =

River in Maranhão, Brazil

Coordinates: 2°01′S 45°11′W

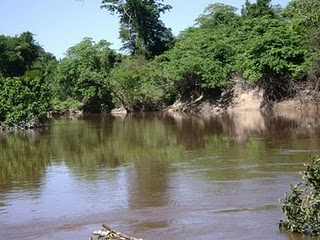

Location
- Country: Brazil

Physical characteristics
- Source
  - location: Maranhão state

The Turiaçu River is a river of Maranhão state in northeastern Brazil.

== See also ==
- List of rivers of Maranhão
