= Lago do Junco =

Coordinates: 4.60889°S 45.0489°W

- Municipality
- Interactive map of Lago do Junco
- Country: Brazil
- Region: Nordeste
- State: Maranhão
- Mesoregion: Centro Maranhense

Population (2020)
  - Total: 10,869
- Time zone: UTC−3 (BRT)

Lago do Junco is a municipality in the state of Maranhão in the Northeast region of Brazil.

== See also ==
- List of municipalities in Maranhão
