= Mearim River =

River with a tidal bore in Maranhão, Brazil

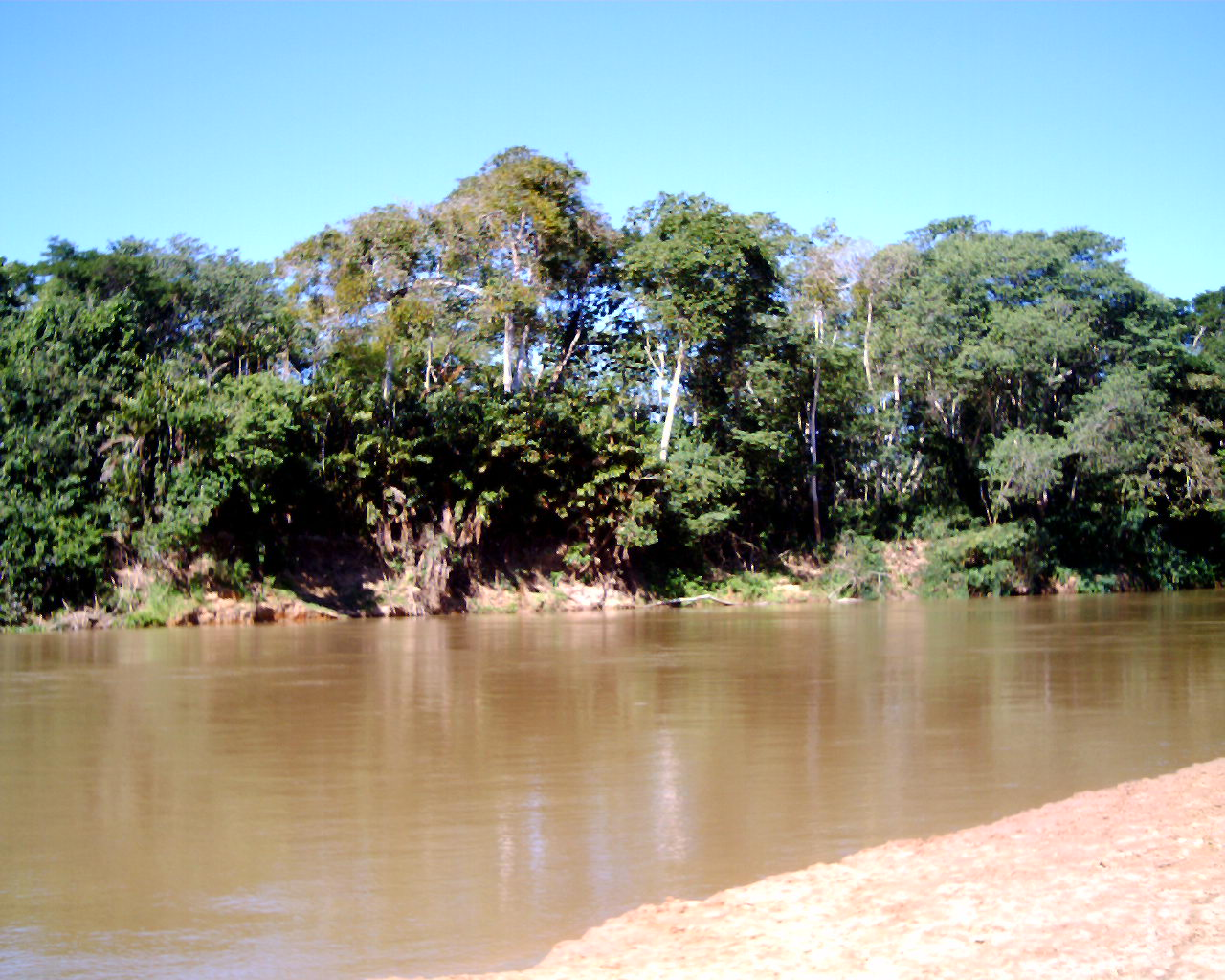
- Mearim River

- Mouth location in Brazil

Location
- Country: Brazil

Physical characteristics
- Mouth
  - coordinates: 3°04′06″S 44°35′04″W

Basin features
- River system: Baía de São Marcos

The Mearim River (Brazilian Portuguese pronunciation: [meaˈɾĩ]) is a river in Maranhão state of northern Brazil. The river originates in the southern part of Maranhão, and drains north into the Baía de São Marcos, an estuary that also receives the Pindaré and Grajaú rivers, which are sometimes considered tributaries of the Mearim. The lower Mearim is known for its pororoca, or tidal bore.

The Mearim is approximately 800 kilometers long, flowing through the marshlands of the Atlantic Coastal Plain. It meets the Atlantic Ocean at the Sao Marcos Bay, where it forms a common estuary with another river, Pindare. The Mearim's primary source of water is rain. The river's upper and middle courses are characterized by rapids. Only the lower sections of the Mearim are suitable for navigation. The river defines the southern boundary of the Tocantins–Araguaia–Maranhão moist forests ecoregion.
