= Itapecuru River =

River in Maranhão, Brazil

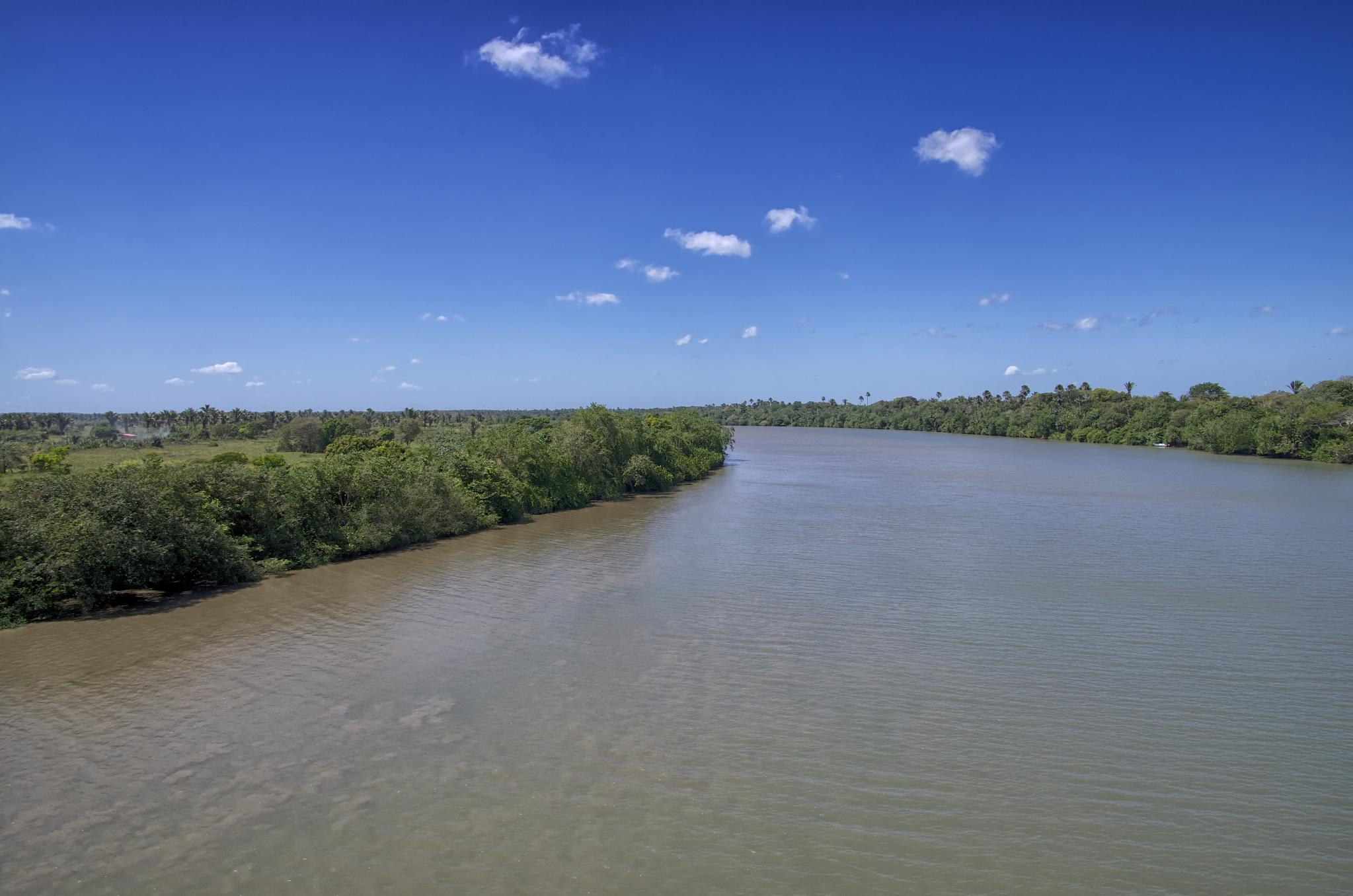
- Itapecuru River, in Rosário city

- Location within Brazil
- Native name: Rio Itapecuru (Portuguese)

Location
- Country: Brazil

Physical characteristics
- Source
  - location: Serra da Crueira
  - elevation: 530 m
- Mouth
  - location: Baía do Arraial
  - coordinates: 2.778510°S 44.157059°W
  - elevation: 0 m
- Length: 1,041 km (647 mi)

Basin features
- Tributaries
  - left: Alpercatas River

The Itapecuru River (Portuguese: Rio Itapecuru) is a river in the Maranhão state of northern Brazil.

== Course ==
The Itapecuru originates in the southern part of the state, in the Serra do Itapecuru, which rises to 660 metres (2,170 ft), and flows northward to empty into Baía do Arraial, an arm of the larger Baía de São José. It is an important source of water for twenty cities in Maranhão, including São Luís. Some of the headwaters of the river are protected by the 437,000 hectares (1,080,000 acres) Mirador State Park, created in 1980.
