= Hydrography of Argentina =

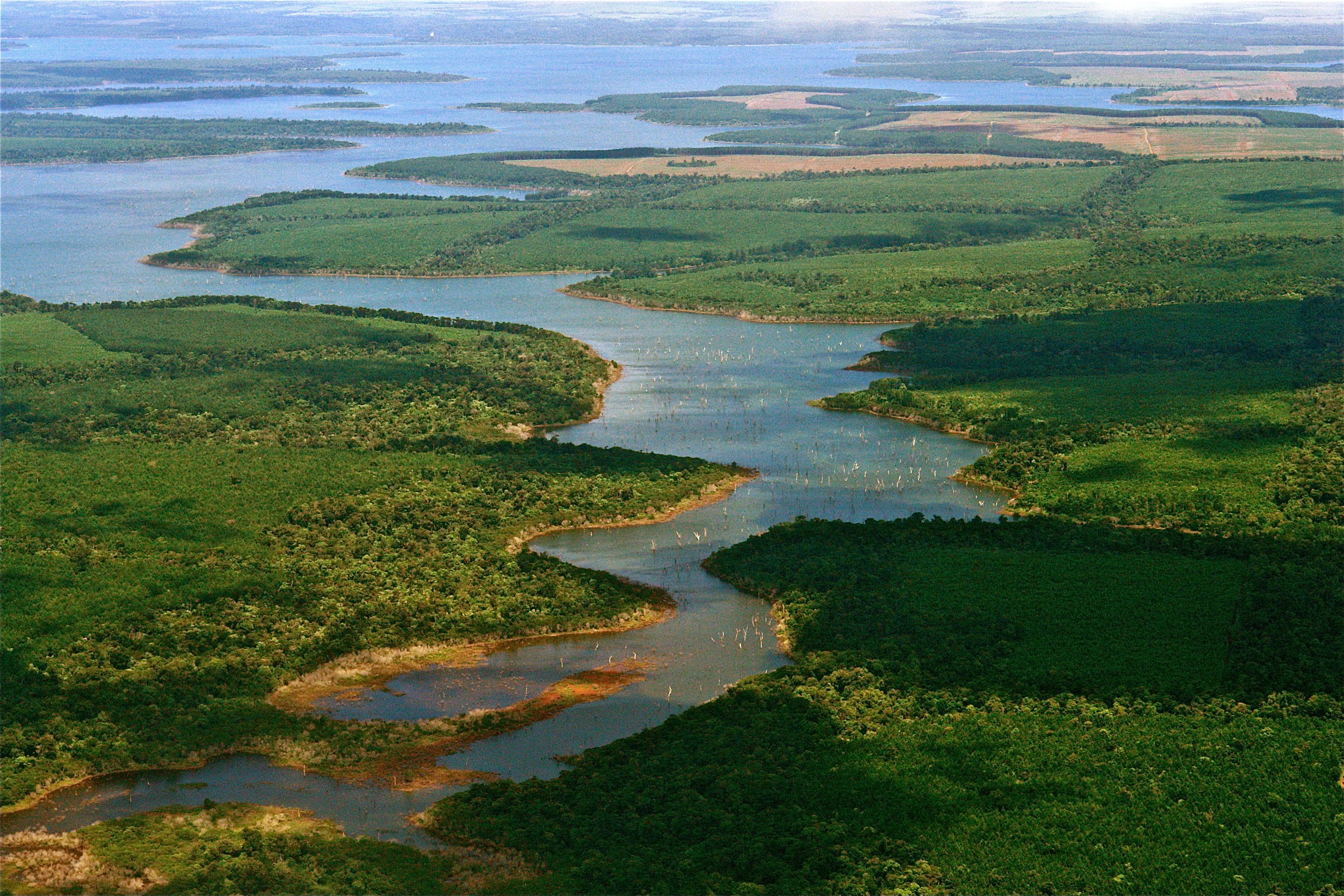
The Iberá Wetlands.

The hydrography of Argentina refers to the distribution of surface water in Argentina. It consists of the country's various natural water bodies, such as lakes, rivers, and wetlands, as well as man-made ones, such as reservoirs and canals.

Covering an area of about 2.78 million km^{2} (1.07 million sq mi), (Note: Data is from the CIA World Factbook. Excludes claims on Argentine Antarctica (969,000 km^{2}), on Malvinas/Falkland Islands (12,173 km^{2}) and on South Georgia and the South Sandwich Islands (3,903 km^{2}).) Argentina is the 8th largest country in the world. As a result, its landscapes can vary greatly across regions, leading to hydrographic systems that cover multiple ecosystems and climatic zones.

== Lakes and rivers ==
Given its diverse climates and latitudes, Argentine rivers vary greatly depending on the region. Rivers in the northeast of the country are large and long, while in the northwest, they have low flow. In the south, there are rivers with high flow near the Andes, but these decrease as they cross the arid Patagonia.

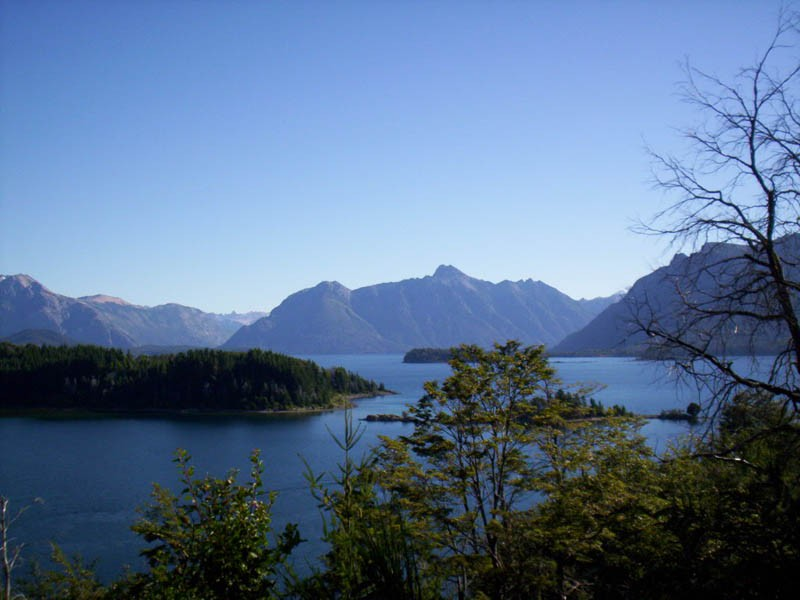
The Nahuel Huapi Lake.

Argentine rivers are divided into three main drainage systems. These are the Atlantic watershed, which drains into the Argentine Sea, the Pacific watershed, whose rivers cross the Andes into Chile, and the endorheic (internal) basins, where rivers terminate inland without reaching the sea:

- Atlantic watershed: This is by far the largest drainage system in the country and includes the Río de la Plata Basin, the Patagonian river system, and a series of smaller rivers in Buenos Aires Province. The Río de la Plata Basin is the country's principal drainage system, centered on the Río de la Plata estuary and fed by the Paraná and Uruguay rivers, together with major tributaries such as the Paraguay, Pilcomayo, Bermejo, and Salado rivers. The Patagonian system consists of snowmelt-fed rivers originating in the Andes, including the Colorado, Negro, Chubut, and Santa Cruz rivers, all of which flow eastward into the Atlantic Ocean.
- Pacific watershed: This is much smaller and consists of short rivers that originate in the Patagonian Andes and flow west into Chile. These rivers are primarily fed by snowmelt and rainfall, with the Manso and Futaleufú rivers among the most important.
- Endorheic basins: These are concentrated in central and western Argentina. They are formed by rivers with variable flows that lose their water through evaporation or infiltration, or terminate in inland lakes and saline lagoons rather than reaching the sea. The most important are the Desaguadero Basin, which drains much of the Cuyo region, and the Mar Chiquita Basin in Córdoba Province, which receives the Dulce, Primero, and Segundo rivers.

Argentina also has a large number of lakes and lagoons. These are concentrated mainly in Patagonia, where glacial activity has formed large lakes such as Nahuel Huapi and Viedma. The Chaco-Pampean Plain contains numerous freshwater and saline lakes, while extensive wetlands occur in areas such as the Iberá Marshes. The largest freshwater lake in Argentina is Lago Argentino, while the largest saline lake is the Mar Chiquita Lake.

== Surface runoff ==
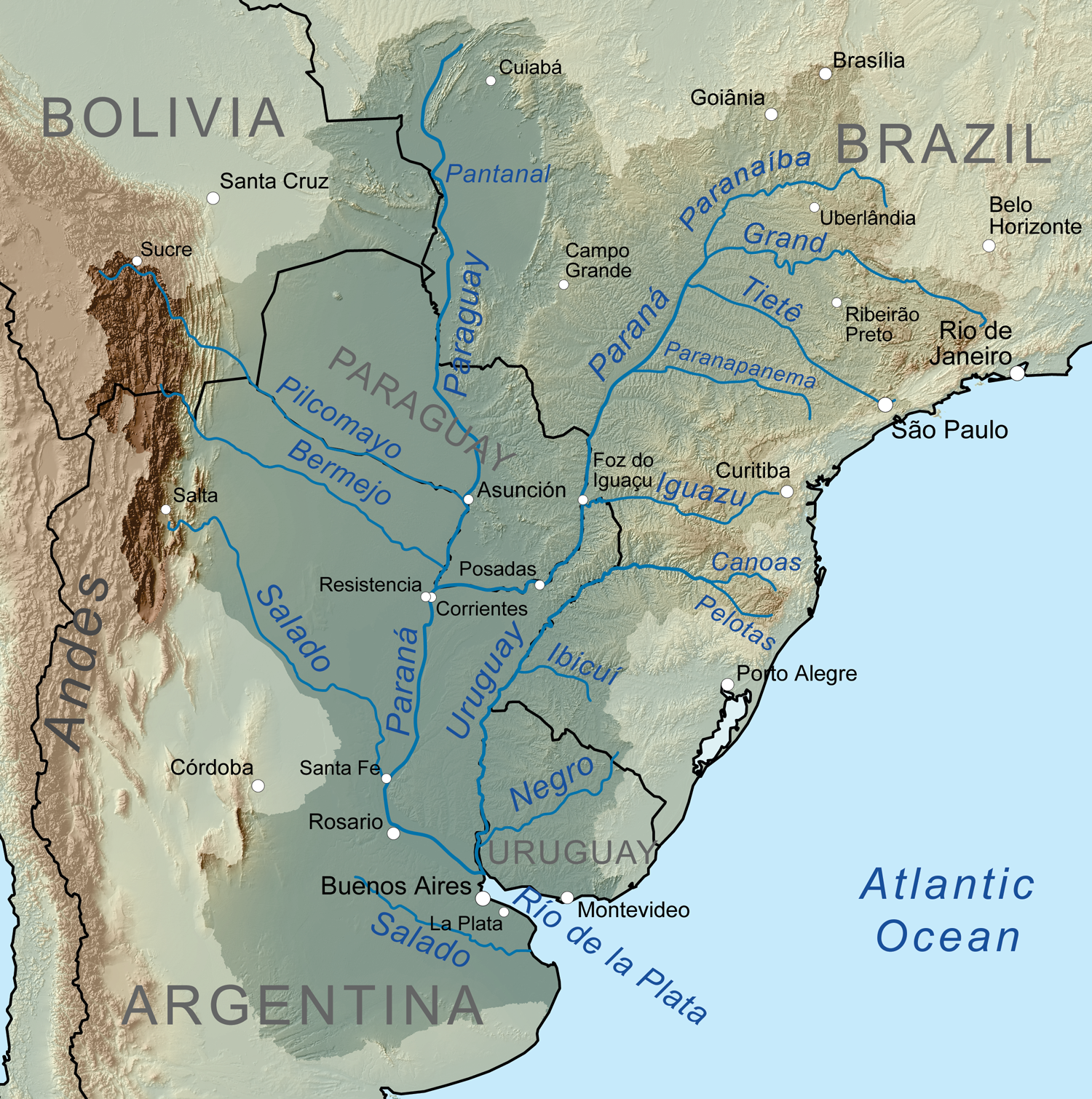
A map of the Río de la Plata drainage basin.

Based on surface runoff characteristics, Argentina can be divided into three types of drainage areas depending on where the waters ultimately flow:

- Arreic basins: These areas lack permanent surface watercourses, or have poorly defined drainage due to minimal runoff and high infiltration. They occur mainly in the semi-arid regions of Chaco and La Pampa, the Patagonian basalt plateaus, and the Puna of northwestern Argentina.
- Endorheic basins: These retain water within inland basins, where rivers terminate in lakes, lagoons, marshes, or disappear before reaching the sea. They include the central inland systems (such as the Desaguadero River, Mar Chiquita, and Quinto River systems), the Pampas Basin with numerous small rivers and lowland depressions, and the Andean Basin, where mountain rivers are generally lost in lakes or lagoons.
- Exorheic basins: These drain to the sea and cover most of the country. They are divided into two main drainage slopes. The Atlantic slope is the largest drainage system, including the Río de la Plata Basin (formed by the Paraná River, Uruguay River, and Río de la Plata), the central rivers that flow directly into the Atlantic, and the Patagonian rivers that descend from the Andes to the Atlantic. On the other hand, the Pacific slope is a small group of river basins that cross the Andes westward into Chile.

== Wetlands, reservoirs and aquifers ==
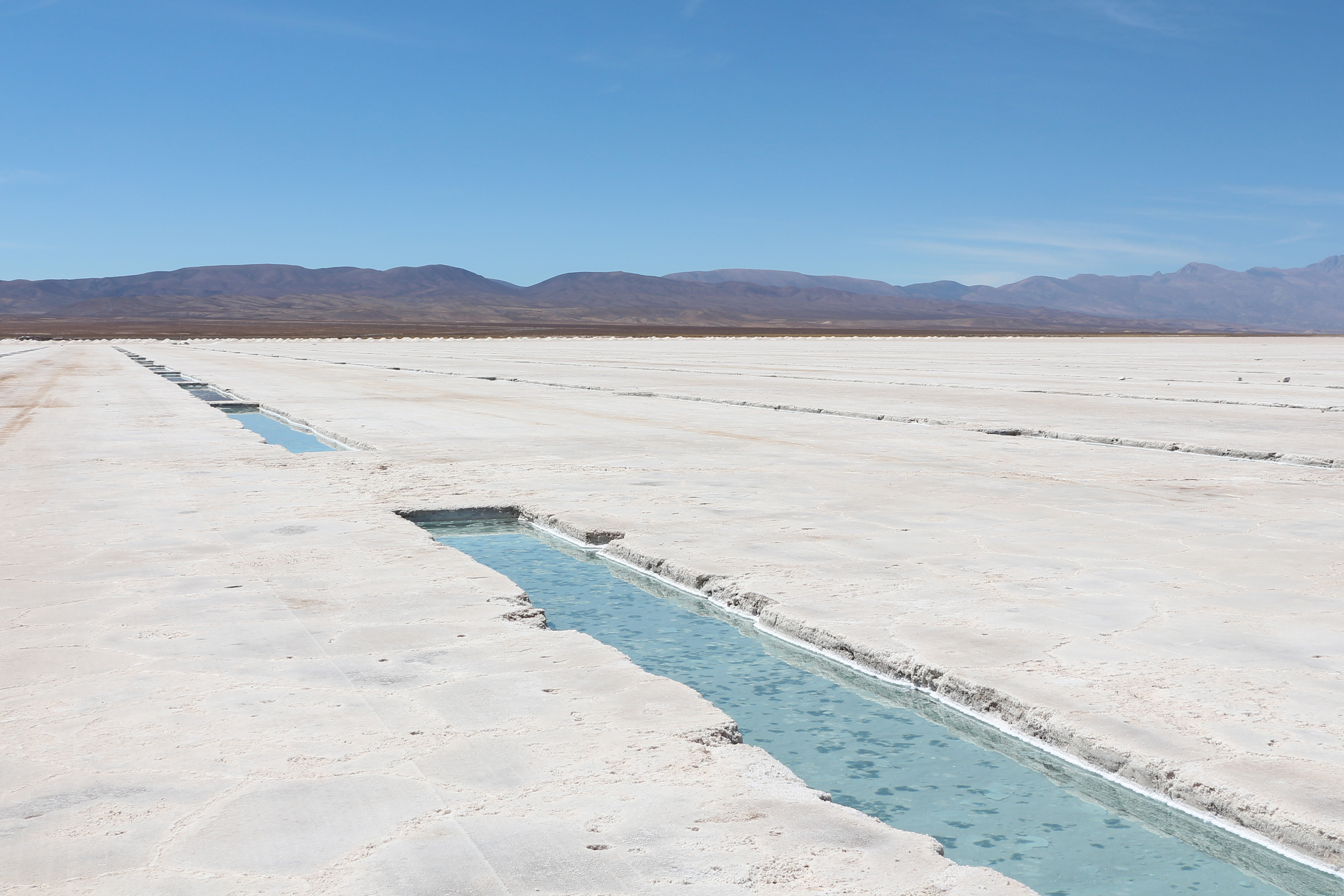
Salinas Grandes, in the provinces of Jujuy and Salta.

There are 24 wetlands of international importance in Argentina as of 2025. This includes Iberá, which is the second largest wetland in the world. Wetlands are considered important for biodiversity conservation, especially in arid or desert regions. It is estimated that 25% of bird species recorded in Argentina have some degree of dependence on the wetland environment. Argentina also has several salt flats, including Salinas Grandes, which are primarily located between the west-central and northwestern regions of the country.

Reservoir construction in Argentina began in the early 20th century, and presently, there are around 100 artificial lakes of varying sizes, generally used for regulating river flows, irrigation, and generating electricity.

Other water bodies in Argentina include aquifers such as the Guarani Aquifer, a vast underground freshwater reservoir shared by Brazil, Argentina, Paraguay, and Uruguay, and the Toba Aquifer, located beneath the provinces of Salta, Jujuy, Tucumán, Formosa, Chaco, and Santiago del Estero. The latter is part of a larger transboundary system, the Toba-Yrendá-Tarijeño Aquifer, shared by Paraguay, Argentina, and Bolivia. Additionally, the Puelche Aquifer, located beneath parts of the provinces of Santa Fe, Córdoba, and Buenos Aires, was essential for the development of the city of Buenos Aires in the mid-19th century.

== Glaciers ==
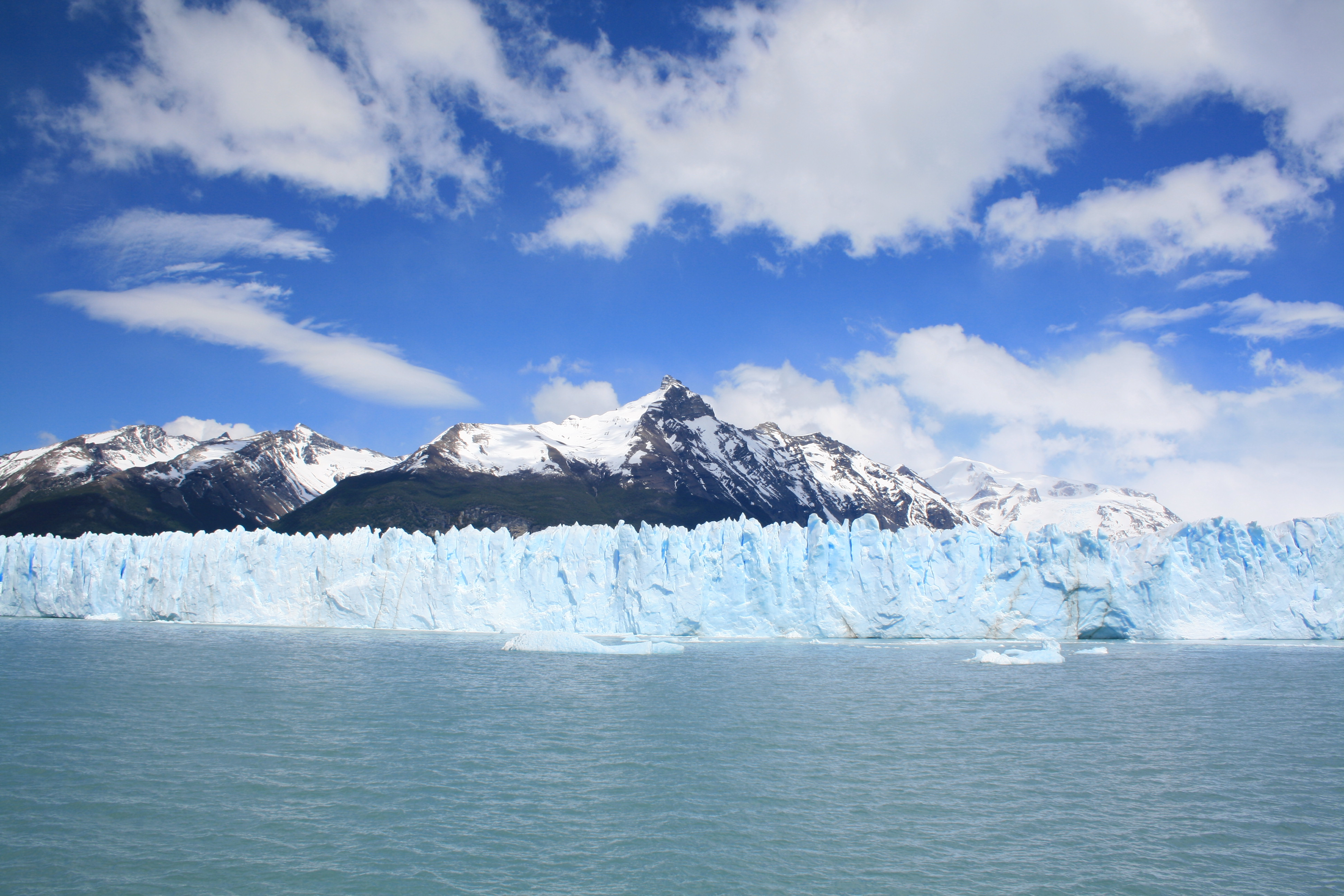
The Perito Moreno Glacier.

Glaciers are a key component of Andean water systems, acting as a large network of natural reservoirs of frozen freshwater year-round. The ice feeds several watersheds, even in areas that would otherwise be completely arid, such as the desert region of the Andes, from the center to the north of the country.

According to the Argentine Institute of Snow Science, Glaciology and Environmental Sciences, Argentina has 16,968 ice bodies that are larger than 1 hectare (10,000 m^{2}). These include glaciers and debris-covered glaciers, most of which are located in the Andes Mountains. Some notable glaciers include the Perito Moreno Glacier and the Viedma Glacier in the Southern Patagonian Ice Field.

Due to increasing temperatures from climate change, many glaciers are rapidly receding, including the Upsala Glacier, whose terminus has receded around 9 kilometres (5.6 mi) since 1986.
