= Guaviraví, Corrientes =

Guaviraví
- Municipality
- Coordinates: 29°22′00″S 56°50′00″W
- Country: Argentina
- Province: Corrientes
- Department: San Martín
- Elevation: 70 m (230 ft)

Population
  - Total: 699 (2,010)
- Time zone: UTC−3 (ART)
- Postal code: W3232
- Area code: 03772

Guaviraví, is an Argentinean municipality, located in San Martín Department in the Corrientes Province. Its capital city is called Villa Escobar. It is located on National Route 14, 5 km from the Uruguay River.

== Communication routes ==
The main communication route is National Route 14, which links it to the south with Paso de los Libres and to the north with La Cruz. In the locality there is the station 25 de Febrero of the General Urquiza Railway.
