= Iberá National Park =

National park in Argentina

- Parque Nacional Iberá
- IUCN category II (national park)
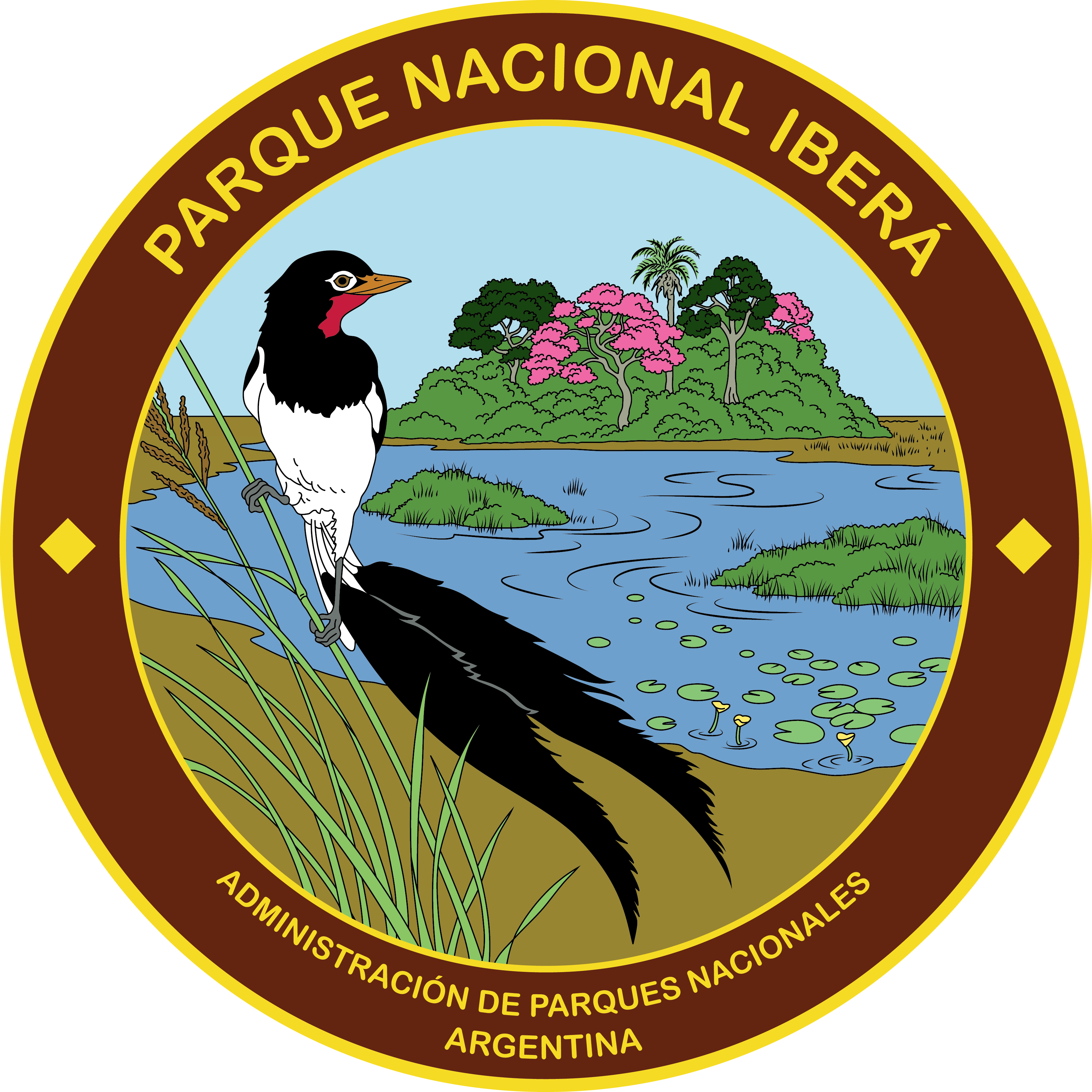
- Emblem of the Iberá National Park

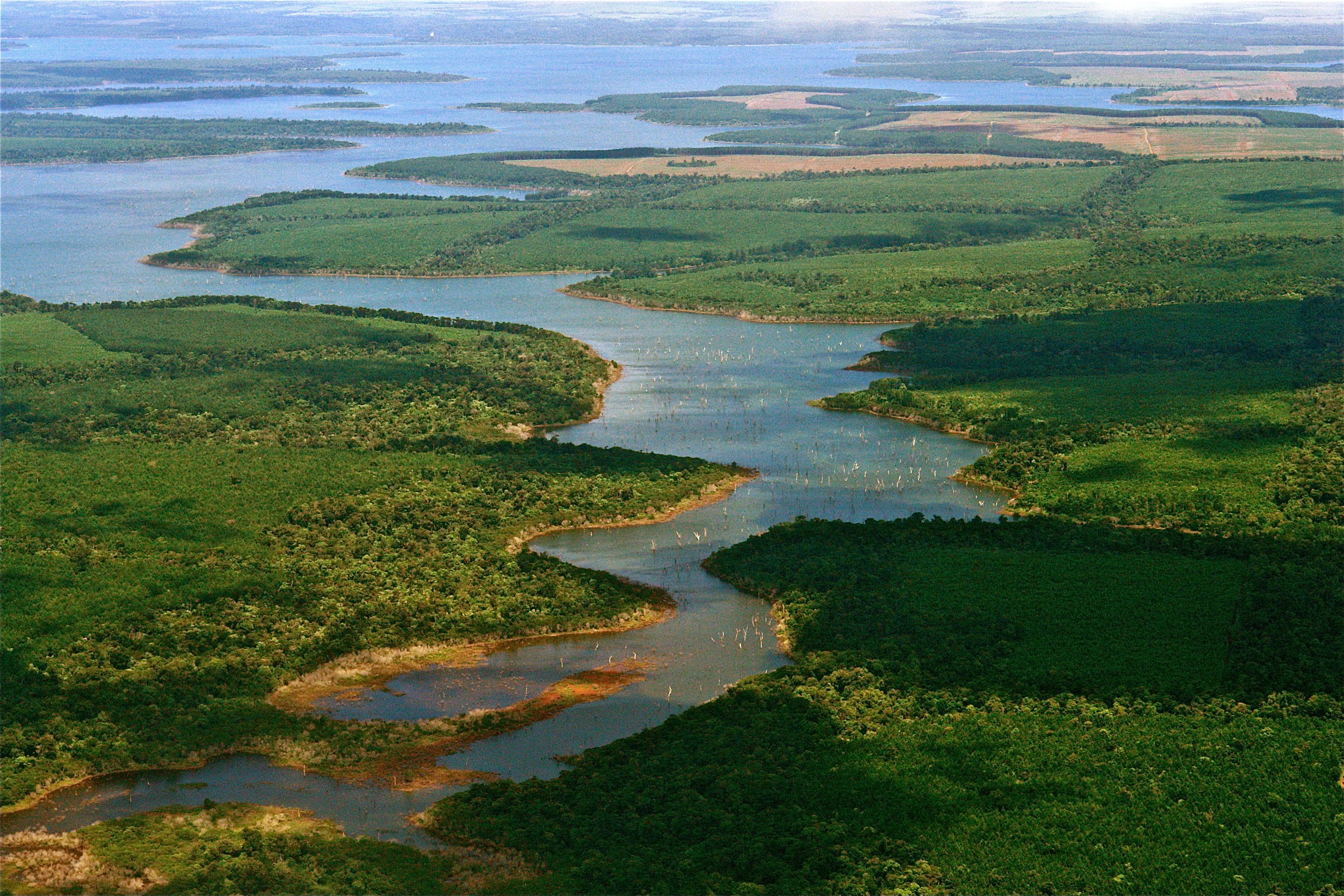
- Aerial view over the Iberá Wetlands

- Location within Argentina
- Interactive map of Iberá National Park
- Location: Corrientes Province
- Coordinates: 28°07′03″S 57°17′18″W
- Area: 195,094 ha (753.26 sq mi)
- Designation: National Park
- Established: 2018
- Website: www.argentina.gob.ar/parquesnacionales/ibera

Iberá National Park is a national park in Argentina located in the northeast province of Corrientes. The national park adjoins the 5,530 km^{2} Iberá Provincial Park to the southeast. The national park and provincial park are both within the Iberá Provincial Nature Reserve, a conservation area of 13,245 km^{2} created in 1982. The combined protected area is the largest in Argentina.

The national park protects a portion of the Iberá Wetlands, one of the largest wetlands in the world. In 2002 an area of 24,500 ha (245 km^{2}; 95 sq mi) was listed as a Wetland of International Importance under the Ramsar convention.

Iberá National Park was created by an act of the Argentinian Congress on December 5, 2018. The park was created from former private cattle ranches acquired since 1999 by the Conservation Land Trust–Argentina, a private foundation established by the conservationists Doug and Kristine Tompkins. In 2015 the Conservation Land Trust donated the lands to the Argentine state to create the park.

The Conservation Land Trust removed most of the cattle from the lands they acquired, and stopped the practice of burning the land to increase cattle fodder. Managed fires have been used to encourage recovery of wild plants and animals, and interior fences were removed to allow wildlife to move freely. Conservation Land Trust is hoping to develop sustainable eco-tourism to support the local economy and build support for further conservation.

The national park along with the combined Iberá protected area is home to more than 4,000 species of flora and fauna, including more than 360 species of birds. The park is a stronghold of the vulnerable species marsh deer and strange-tailed tyrant and contains large populations of capybara, yacare caiman and broad-snouted caiman. The park has reintroduced populations of jaguar, pampas deer, anteater and red-and-green macaw.

== Rewilding ==
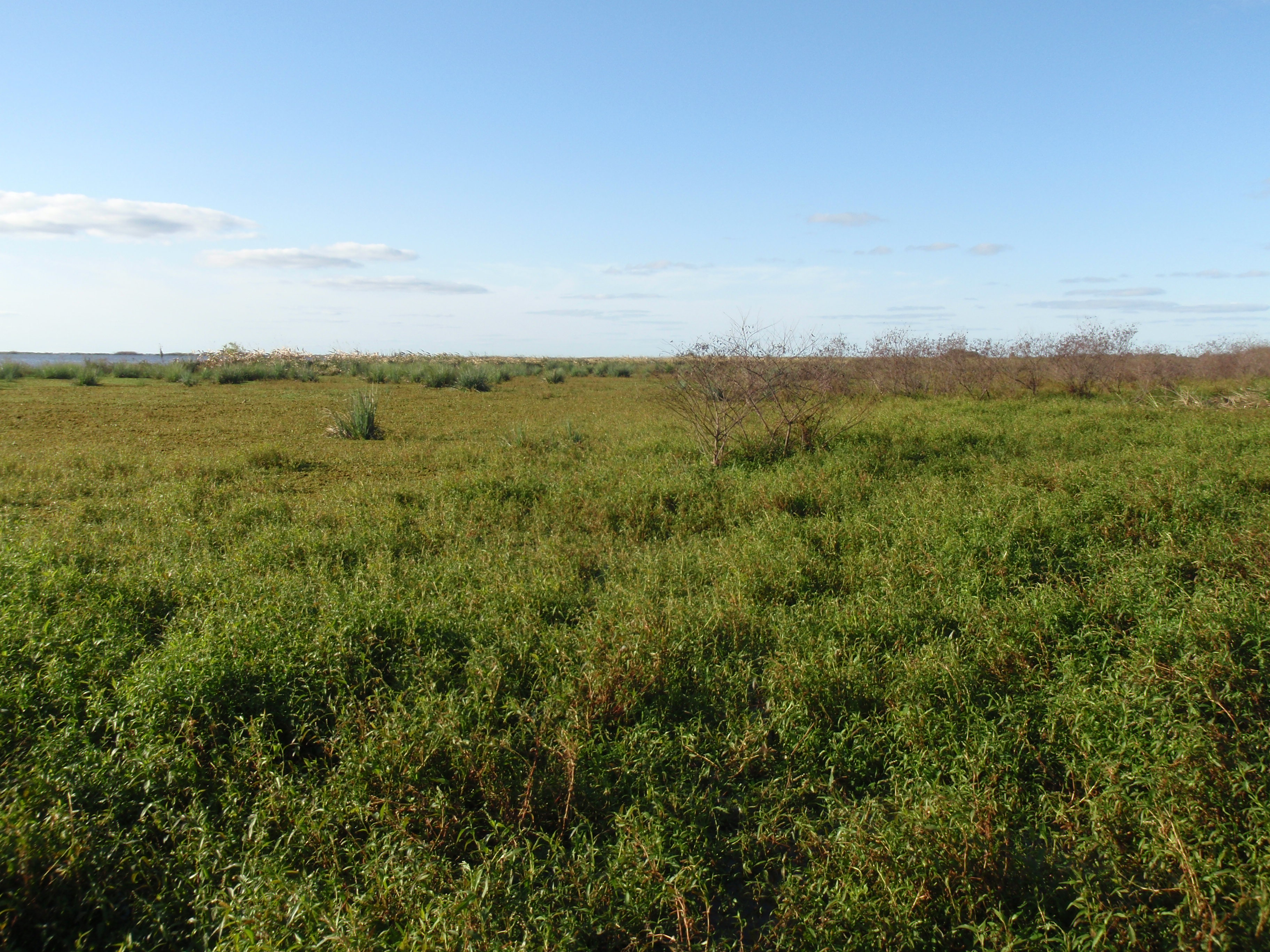
View of the Iberá Wetlands.

In 2007, Tompkins Conservation established a rewilding program with nonprofit partners to reintroduce several native animals that had been extirpated from the area during the 20th century. This rewilding work is now done by Rewilding Argentina, the offspring organization of Tompkins Conservation. Species reintroduced include the giant anteater (Myrmecophaga tridactyla), collared peccary (Dicotyles tajacu), South American tapir (Tapirus terrestris), Pampas deer (Ozotoceros bezoarticus), bare-faced curassow (Crax fasciolata), red-and-green macaw (Ara chloropterus), and red-legged seriema (Seriema cristata). A captive breeding program for jaguars (Panthera onca) was established, in a set of large enclosures where jaguar cubs can be trained to survive by hunting prey so they can someday survive on their own in the wild. In January 2022, the first male jaguar was released into the park, bringing the total of introduced jaguars to eight. Rewilding Argentina has also reintroduced the giant river otter (Pteronura brasiliensis) and the ocelot (leopardus pardalis) to the park.

== Wildfire ==
In January and February 2022, wildfires burned nearly 60% of the park. At least one fire was started by a lightning strike but many of the fires were started on nearby cattle ranches. Managing cattle ranches and grasslands with fire is a common practice in the area, though climate change has affected the area's ability to stop these fires from causing severe damage. Temperatures in the park are higher than seen before and at the time of the fire had been in a two and a half year drought, so the fires were able to get out of control. While the grasslands that cover much of Iberá have evolved with fire and are dependent upon it, forested areas of the park also burned and these forests do not usually experience fire so their recovery will not be quick. Many animals did not survive the fire, since due to the drought there was not much water or unburned patches to seek refuge in. Many of the reintroduced animals were rescued by Rewilding Argentina.
