= Colonia Carlos Pellegrini =

- Municipality and town
- Location of Colonia Carlos Pellegrini in Argentina
- Coordinates: 28°32′14″S 57°10′17″W
- Country: Argentina
- Province: Corrientes
- Department: San Martín Department

Population (2001)
  - Total: 683
- Time zone: UTC−3 (ART)

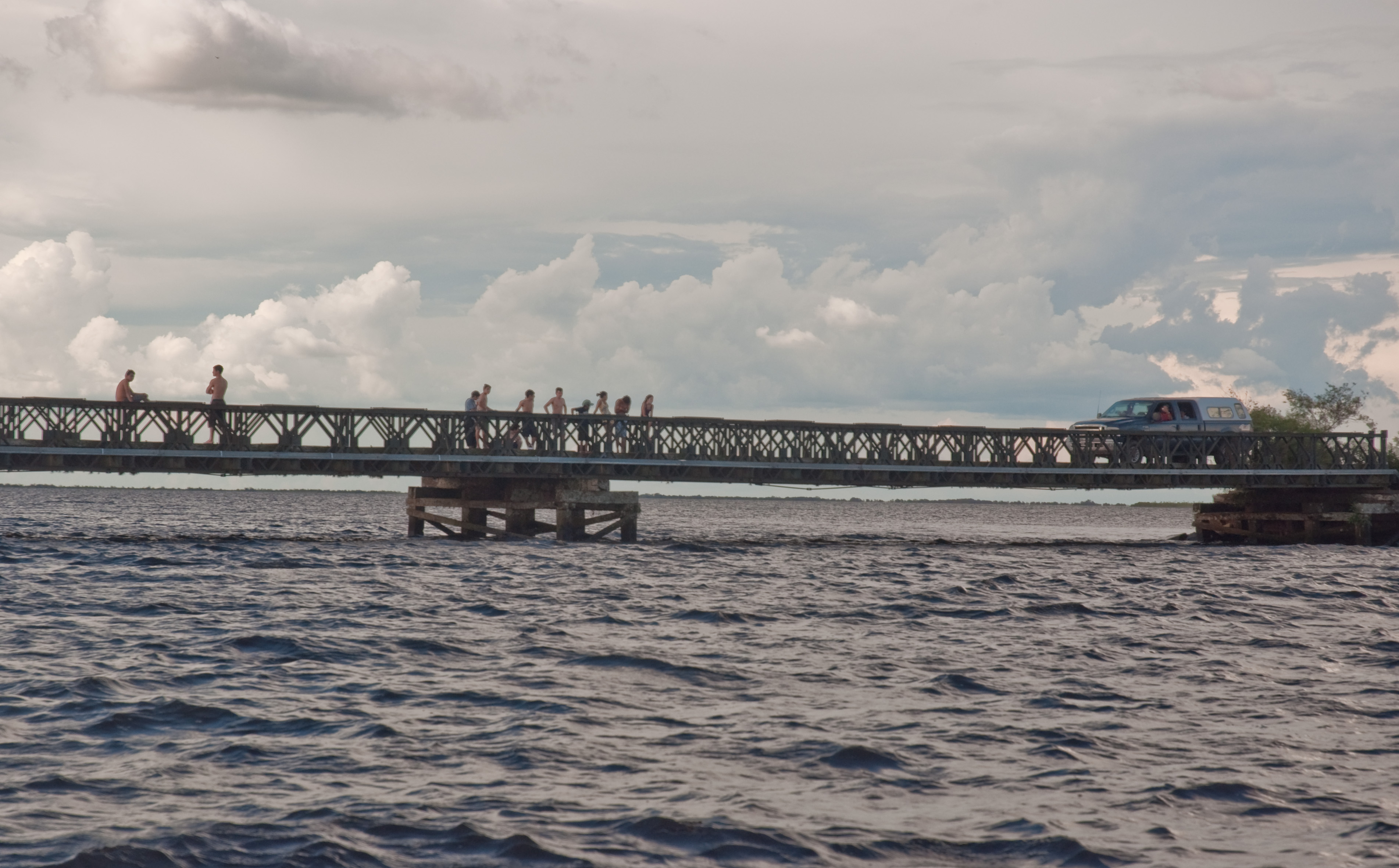

Colonia Carlos Pellegrini is a small town and municipality in San Martín Department in Corrientes Province, Argentina. According to the 2001 population census conducted by INDEC its population was 683 inhabitants. It was established in 1927. It is connected by road to Mercedes in the southwest.

The climate of the area is subtropical, prone to storms, with an average summer temperature of 30 °C and can fall to −2 °C at night at lowest during the winter. The average rainfall is about 2000 mm per year.

It lies within the Iberá Provincial Nature Reserve (Reserva Natural Provincial del Iberá, also known as the Iberá Wetlands), a wetland of 1,300,000 hectares on a peninsula that enters the Iberá lagoon 5,500 ha. It has diverse wildlife, including caiman, swamp deer and over 350 species of birds.
