= Guaviraví =

Guaviraví may refer to:

- Guaviraví River
- Guaviraví, Corrientes
