= San Luis del Palmar Department =

San Luis del Palmar Department Departamento San Luis del Palmar (Spanish) Tetãvore Sán Lui Palmár Pegua (Guarani)
- Department
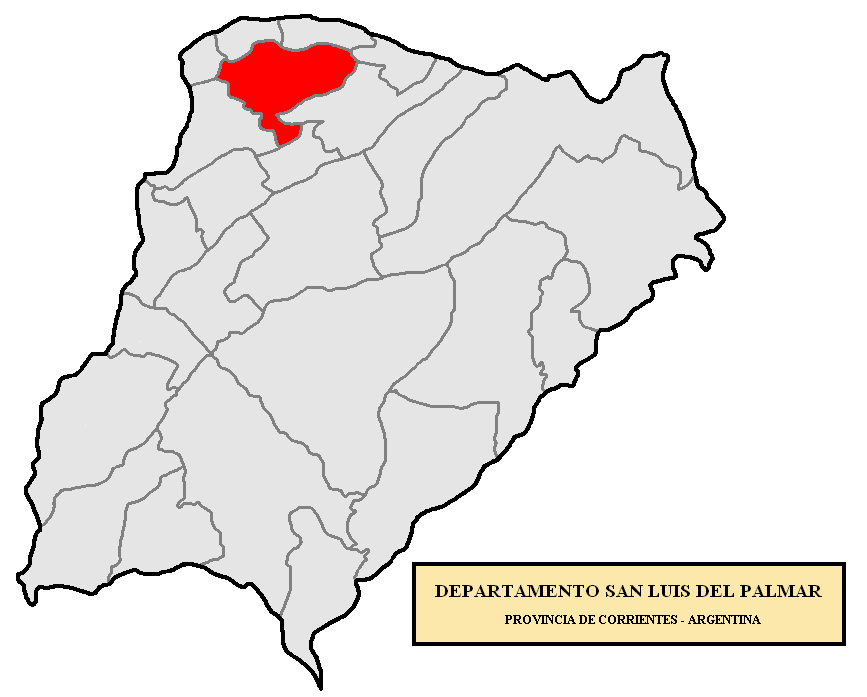
- location of San Luis del Palmar Department in Corrientes Province
- Coordinates: 27°31′S 58°34′W
- Country: Argentina
- Seat: San Luis del Palmar

Area
  - Total: 2,551 km^{2} (985 sq mi)

Population (2001 census [INDEC])
  - Total: 16,513
  - Density: 6.473/km^{2} (16.77/sq mi)
- Postal Code: W3403
- Area Code: 03783

San Luis del Palmar Department is a department of Corrientes Province in Argentina.

The provincial subdivision has a population of about 16,513 inhabitants in an area of 2,551 km^{2} (985 sq mi), and its capital city is San Luis del Palmar, which is located around 1,050 km (650 mi) from Capital Federal.

== Settlements ==
- Herlitzka
- San Luis del Palmar
