= Iberá Provincial Reserve =

Nature reserve in Argentina

- Reserva Provincial Iberá
- IUCN category VI (protected area with sustainable use of natural resources)
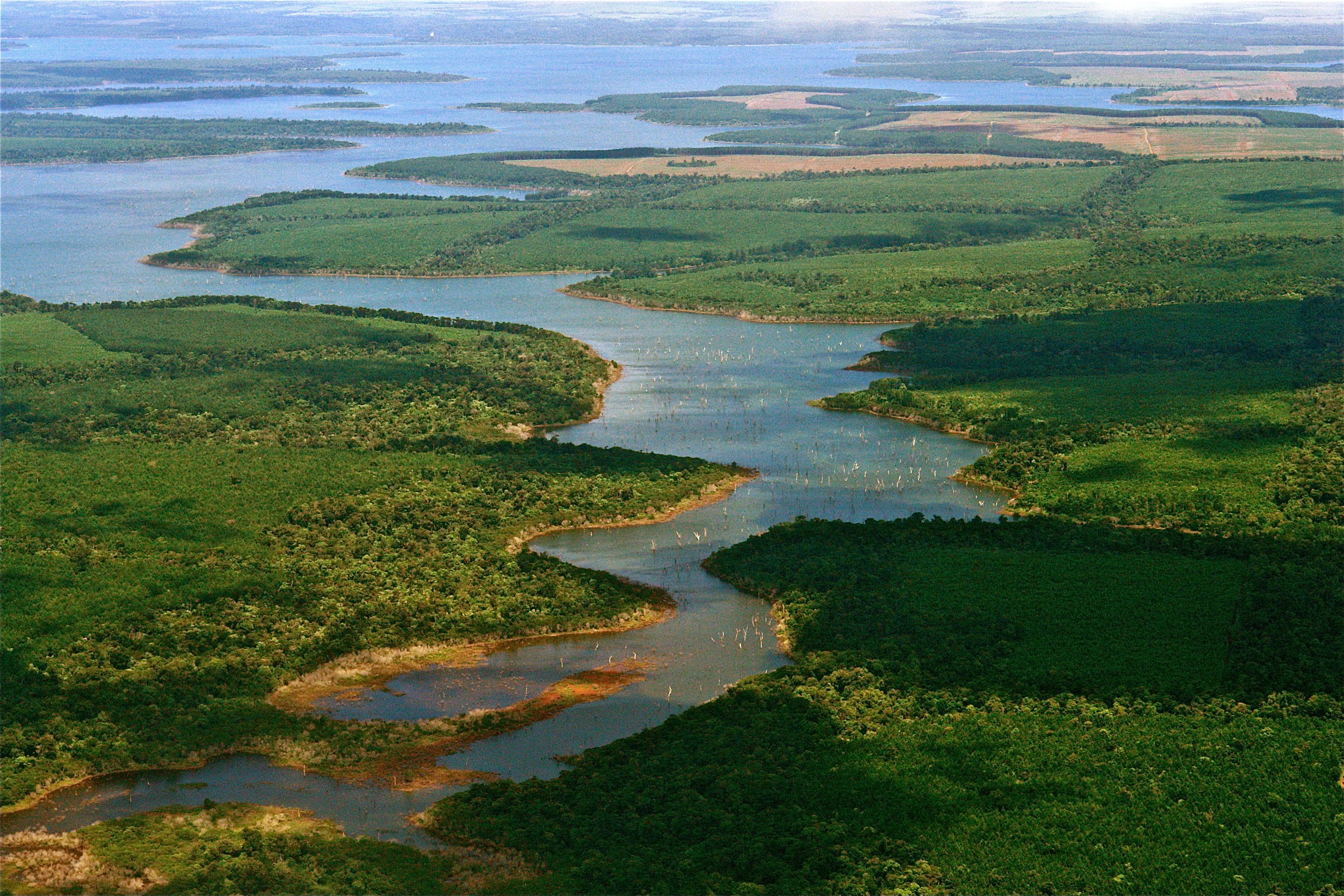
- Low aerial view of Iberá Provincial Reserve

- Location within Argentina
- Location: Corrientes Province, Argentina
- Nearest city: Concepción
- Coordinates: 28°36′0″S 57°48′1″W
- Area: 1,300,000 ha (13,000 km^{2}; 5,000 sq mi)
- Established: April 15, 1983

Ramsar Wetland
- Official name: Lagunas y Esteros del Iberá
- Designated: 18 January 2002
- Reference no.: 1162

The Iberá Provincial Reserve (Spanish: Reserva Provincial Iberá, from Guaraní ý berá: "bright water") is a provincial protected area in the north-west of Corrientes Province, north-eastern Argentina. Established on 15 April 1983, it contains a mix of swamps, bogs, stagnant lakes, lagoons, natural sloughs and courses of water. With an area of about 1,300,000 ha (13,000 km^{2}; 5,000 sq mi), the reserve spans a significant 14% of the Corrientes province, and is the largest protected area in the country.

The reserve protects a portion of the Iberá Wetlands, a greater system of marshes of 1,500,000–2,000,000 ha (15,000–20,000 km^{2}; 5,800–7,700 sq mi), and one of the most important fresh water reservoirs in the continent. In 2002 an area of 24,500 ha (245 km^{2}; 95 sq mi) has been listed as a Wetland of International Importance under the Ramsar convention.

The reserve contains both Iberá Provincial Park and Iberá National Park within its boundaries. The remaining area is mostly private cattle ranches.

Iberá Provincial Park was created in 2009 from public lands controlled by Corrientes Province, and covers an area of 5530 km^{2}. It lies in the southwestern portion of the reserve.

Iberá National Park was created by an act of the Argentinian Congress on December 5, 2018. It lies in the center of the reserve, and covers an area 1,381.4 km^{2}. park was created from former private cattle ranches acquired since 1999 by the Conservation Land Trust–Argentina, a private foundation established by the conservationists Doug and Kristine Tompkins. In 2015 the Conservation Land Trust donated the lands to the Argentine state to create the park.

The Conservation Land Trust removed most of the cattle from the lands they acquired, and stopped the practice of burning the land to increase cattle fodder. Managed fires have been used to encourage recovery of wild plants and animals, and interior fences were removed to allow wildlife to move freely. Conservation Land Trust is hoping to develop sustainable eco-tourism to support the local economy and build support for further conservation.

== Description ==
Throughout the area several permanent lagoons of different size can be distinguished; the largest of them are the eponymous Iberá and Luna, on which banks the village of Colonia Carlos Pellegrini was founded. (Note: This small town is usually regarded as the most convenient starting point to visit the reserve.) The lagoons Fernández, Galarza, Medina, Paraná and Trin also exceed 15 km^{2} (5.8 sq mi). This lagoon system is typically very shallow, although in times of floods it can reach over three meters deep. Few areas of dry land alternate with these water bodies, mostly low and sandy hills; the rest is covered by a large expanse of floodplains.

Spatial orientation becomes extremely difficult because the exact profile of the solid surface is constantly changing, and the visual continuity between the dry land and swamps is almost seamless due to the large number of semi-submerged vegetation. In addition, natural dams are formed by root entanglement of floating vegetation formations that are sometimes strong enough to walk on them.

The climate is distinctly subtropical. Winters are relatively dry, with minimum temperatures reaching −5 °C (23 °F), and strong precipitations during autumn and spring. Summer is very hot and humid, with highs easily exceeding 45 °C (113 °F). Annual rainfall averages 1,700 mm (67 in).

Iberá Provincial Reserve scenery

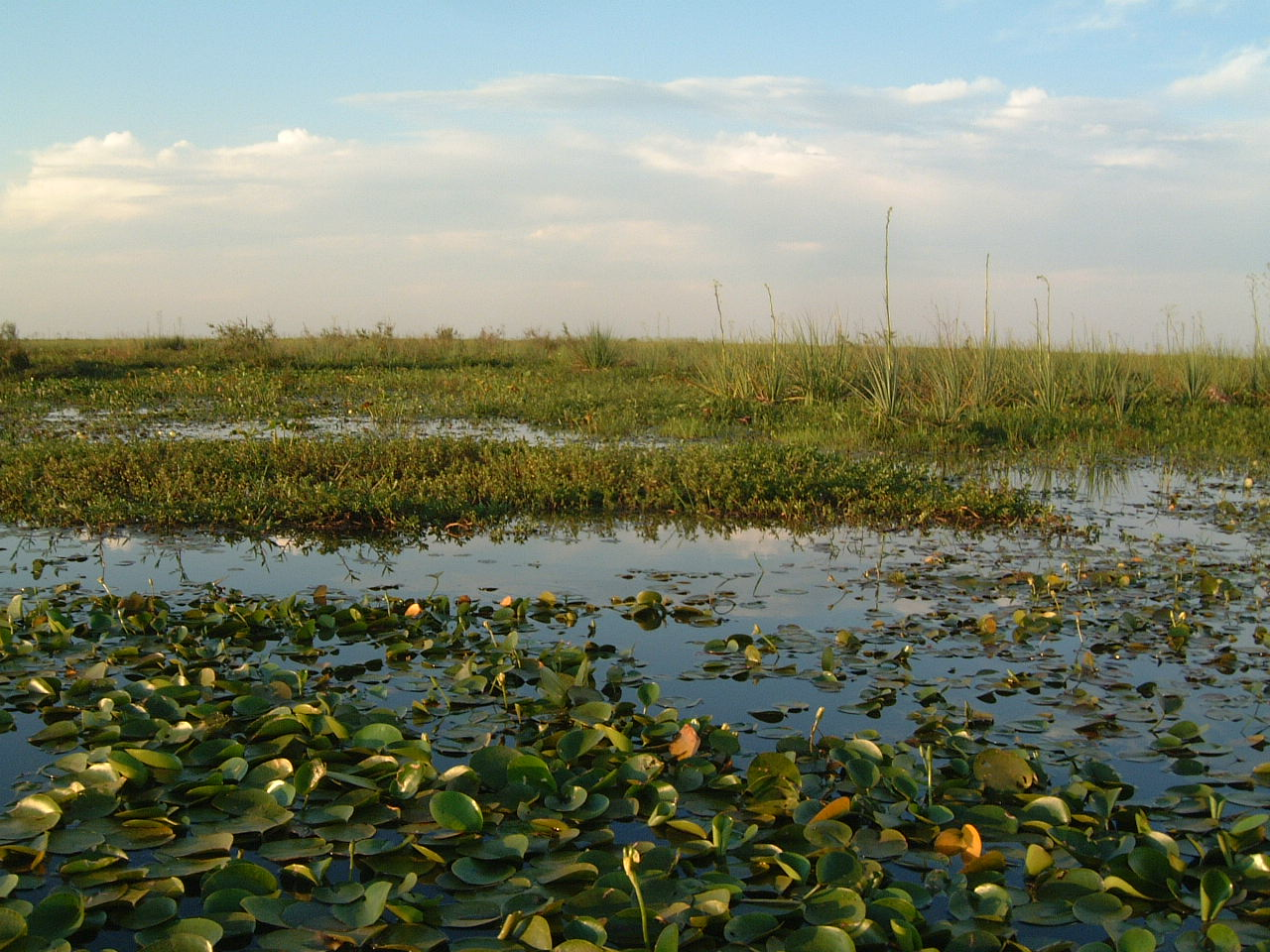
Laguna del Iberá

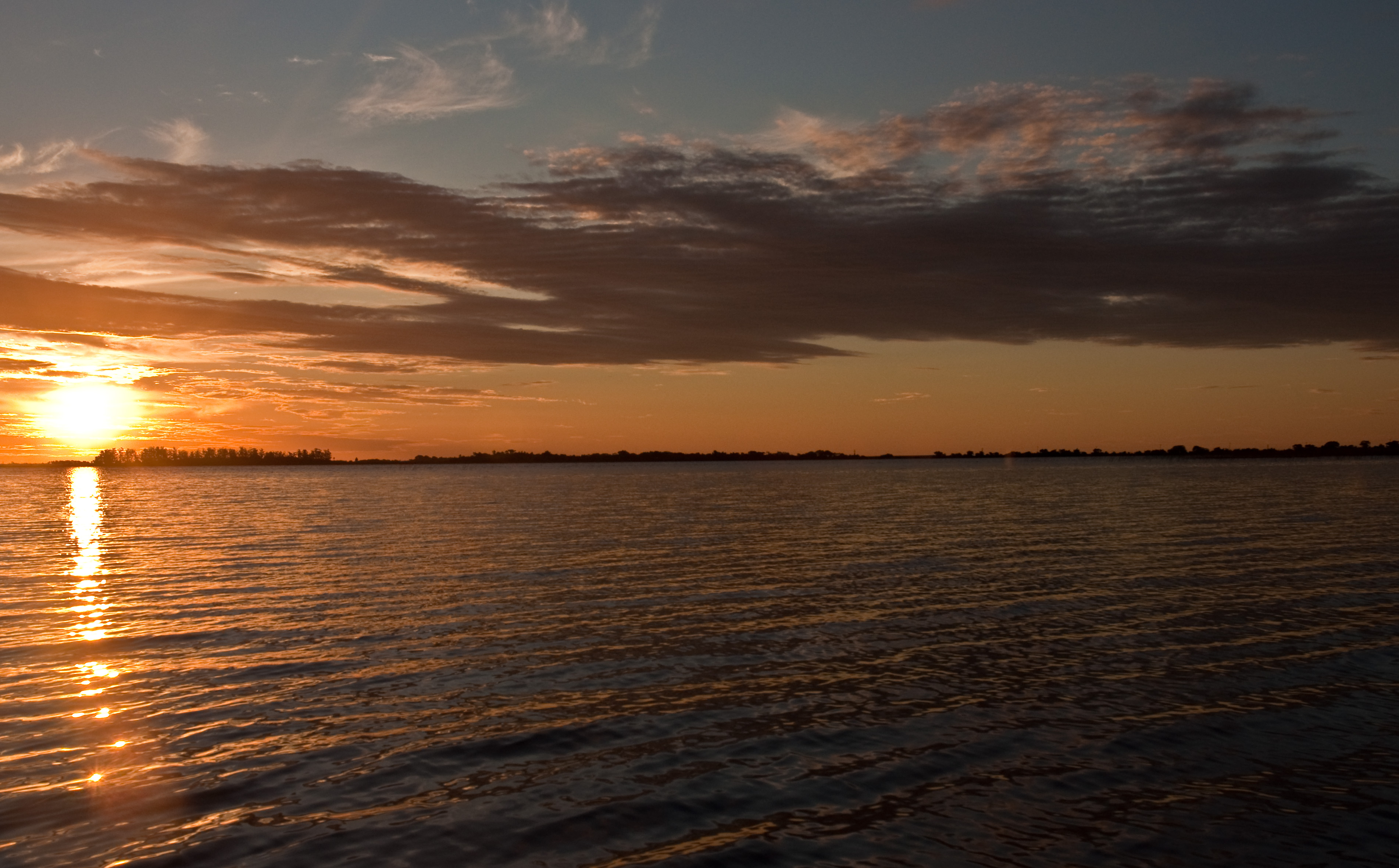
Sunset in Iberá Provincial Reserve

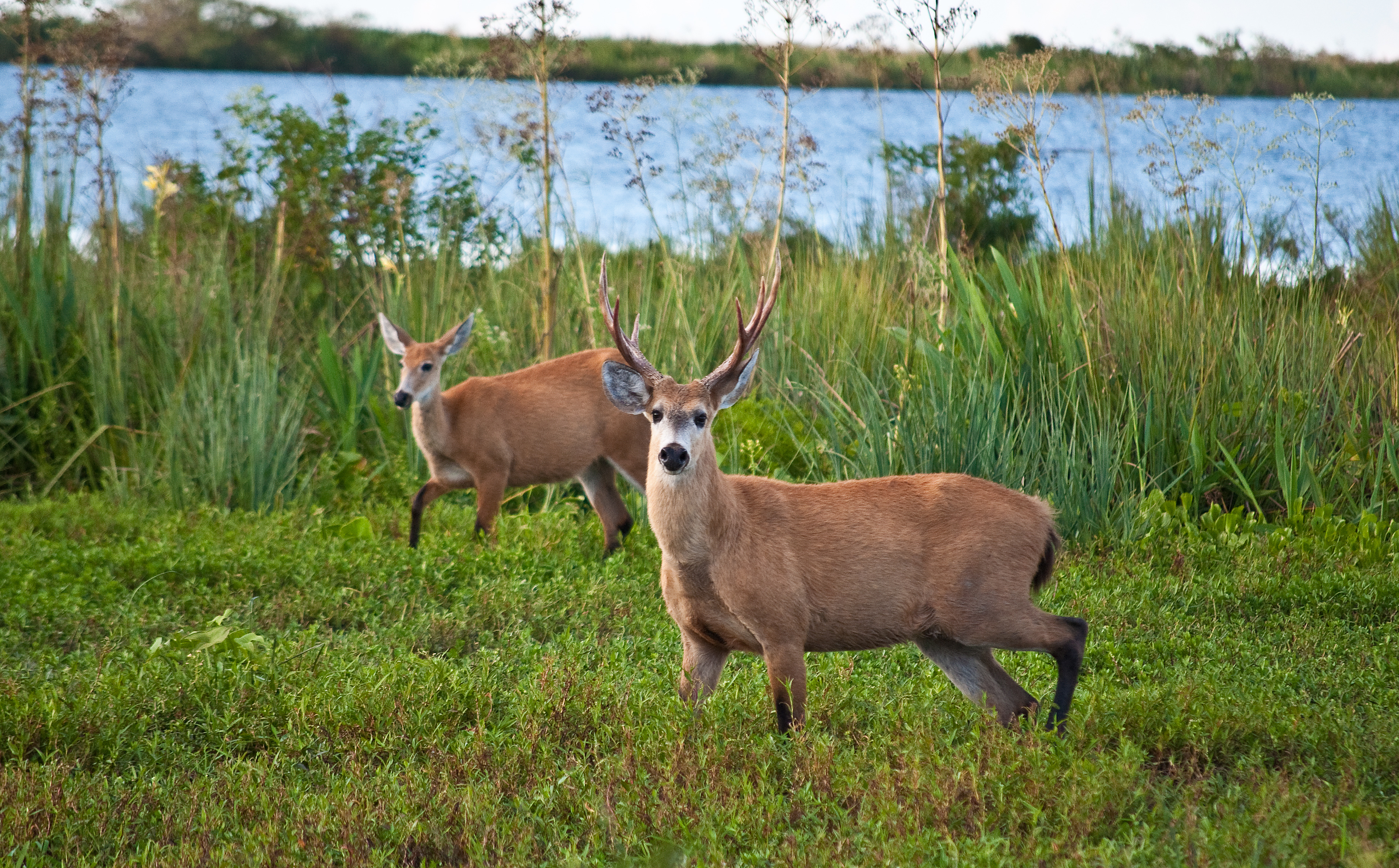
Marsh deer are among the largest herbivores in the esteros

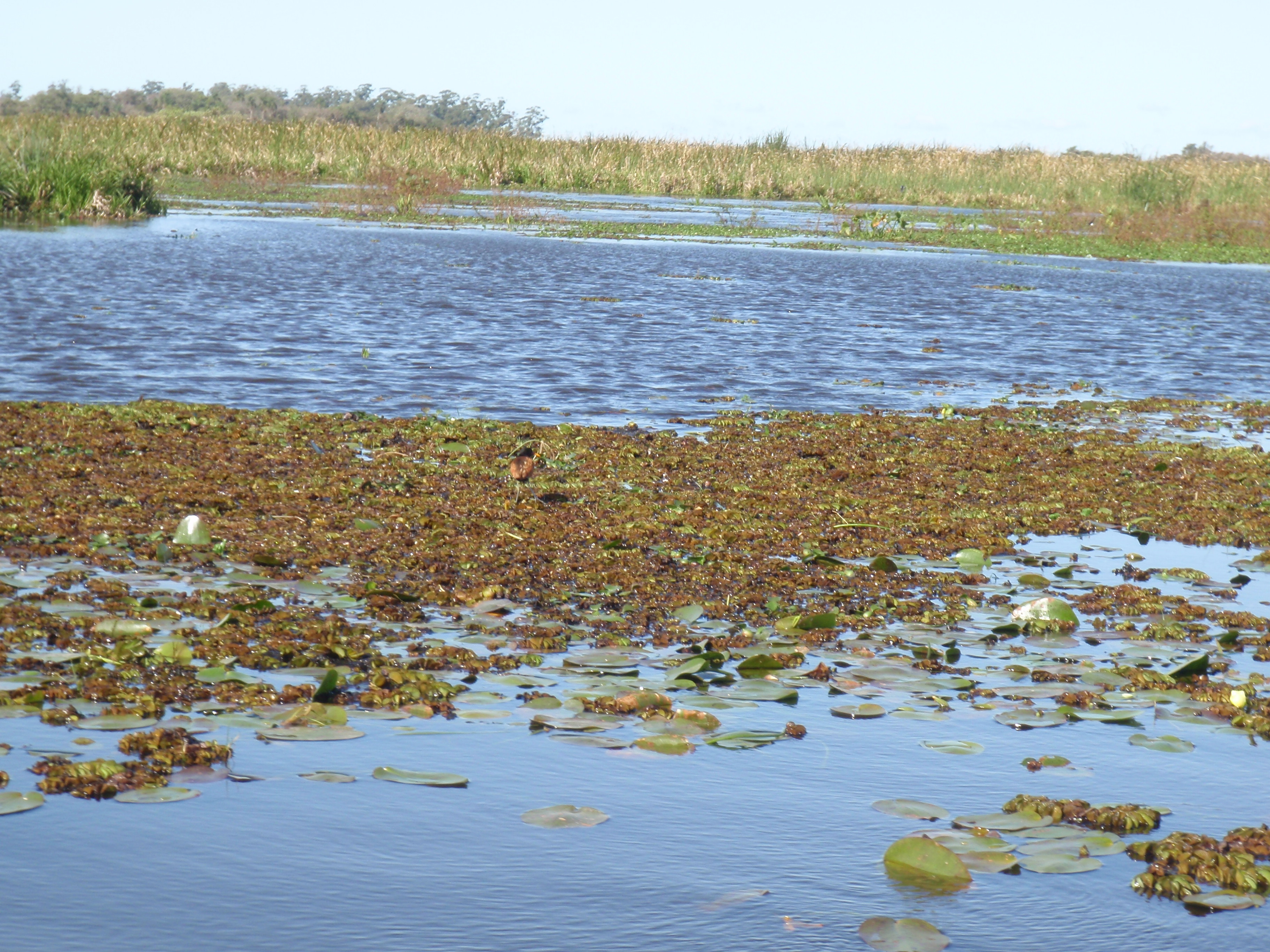
One of many rather shallow lagoons within the reserve

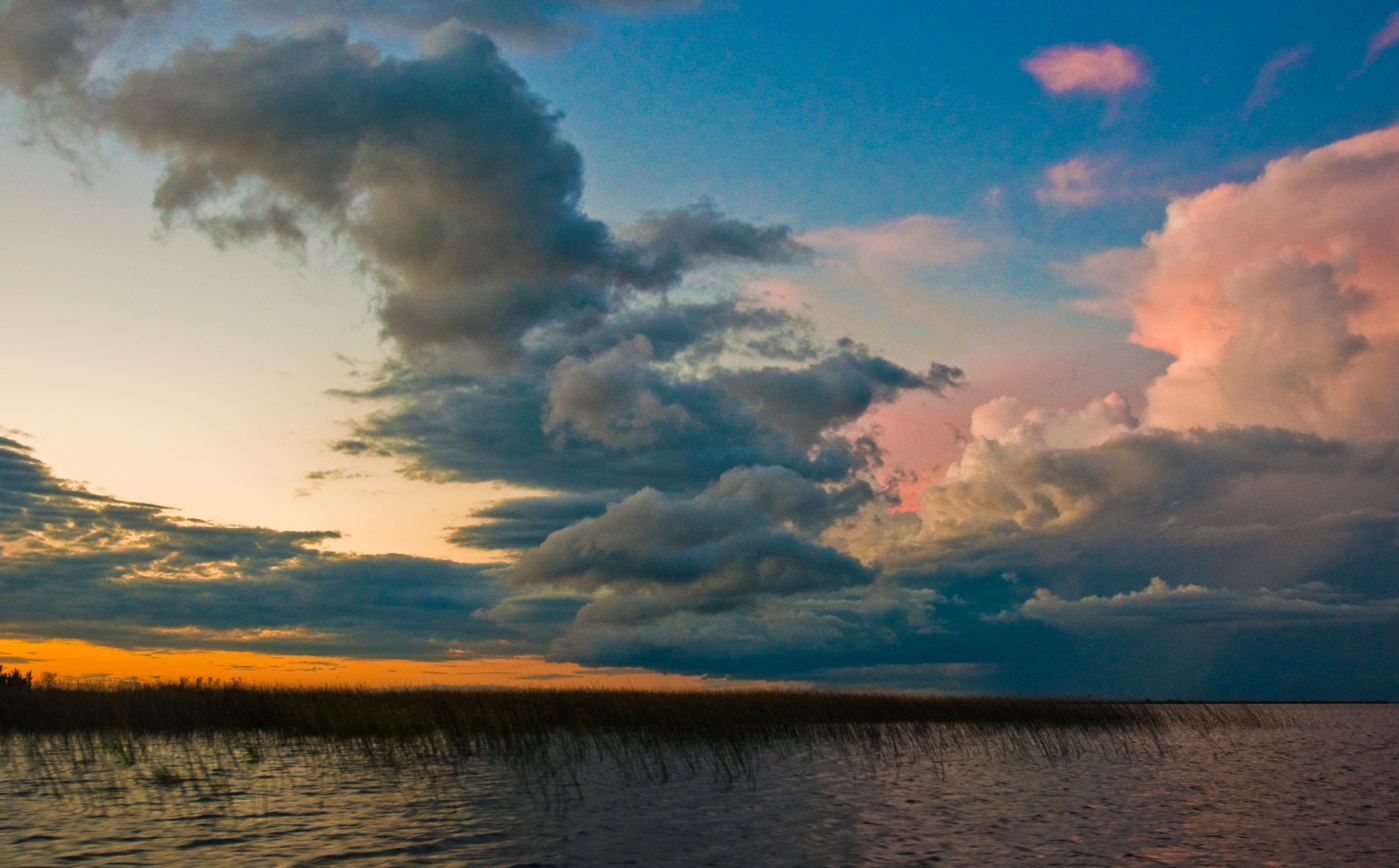
Clouds over the reserve. Annual rainfall averages 1,700 mm (67 in)

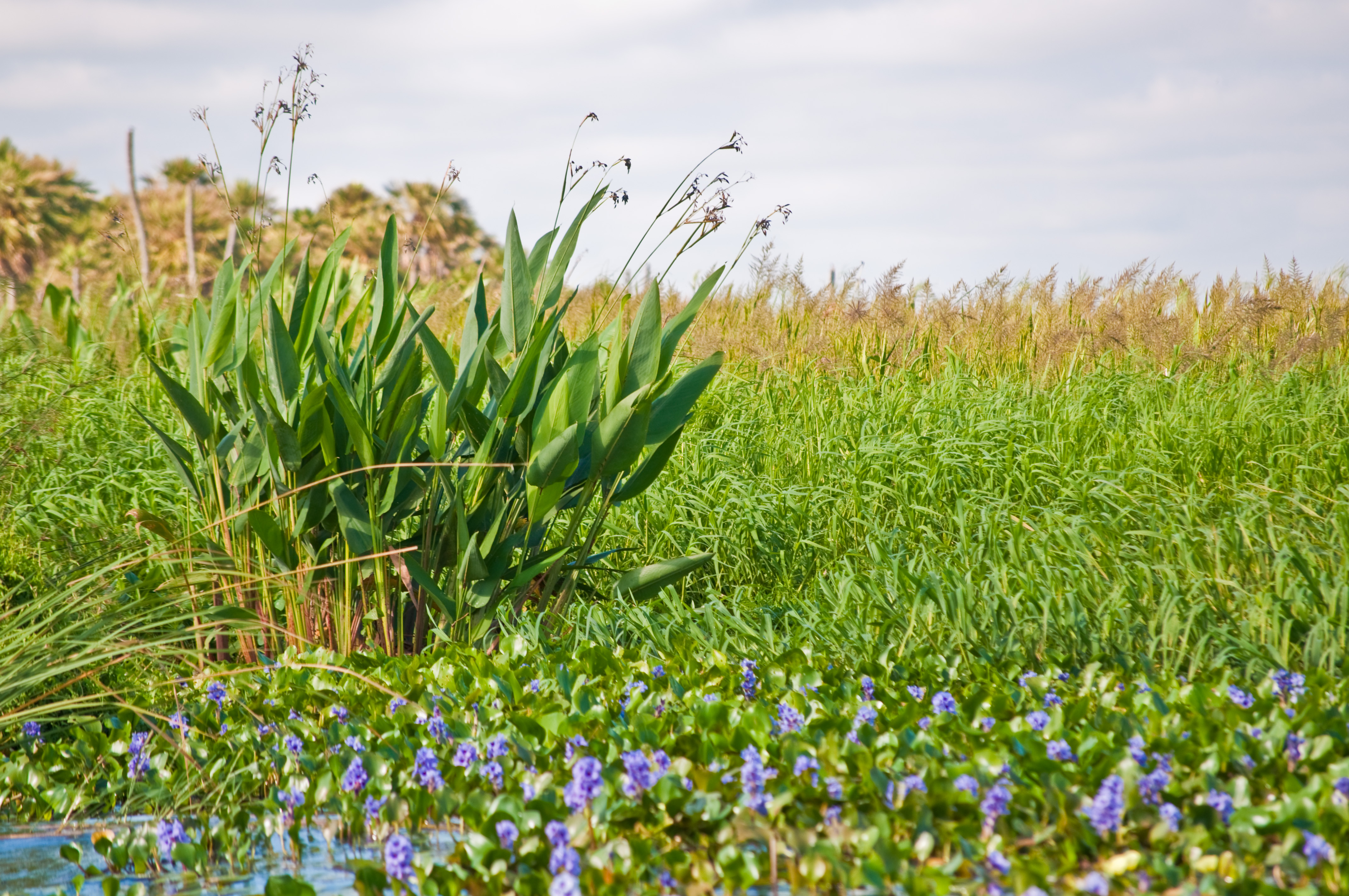
Flowering marshes

== Biodiversity ==
The natural reserve is known for its biodiversity, including four species that have been declared "provincial natural monuments": the neotropical otter (Lontra longicaudis), the maned wolf (Chrysocyon brachyurus), the pampas deer (Ozotoceros bezoarticus) and the marsh deer (Blastocerus dichotomus). It is also home to the two Argentine species of Caiman, the yacare caiman (locally called yacaré negro) and the broad-snouted caiman (yacaré overo), as well as the world's largest rodent, the capybara (Hydrochoerus hydrochaeris), and about 350 bird species.

The red-and-green macaw (Ara chloropterus) is the subject of a re-introduction programme by the World Parrot Trust, Aves Argentinas and Fundación CLT (Conservation Land Trust) (and perhaps BirdLife International) of captive birds from Britain which is hoped may promote tourism to the area. The species is listed as critically endangered in Argentina and it has been claimed that it was extirpated from the country since the 1960s, although there have been a number of records from 2017 onwards further to the north. It is listed as ″a species of global least concern″ on the IUCN Red List. The first birds were imported in 2015 and the first pair of British birds was released in February 2019.

== See also ==
- List of national parks of Argentina
