= San Martín Department, Corrientes =

San Martín Department Departamento San Martín (Spanish) Tetãvore Sán Martín (Guarani)
- Department
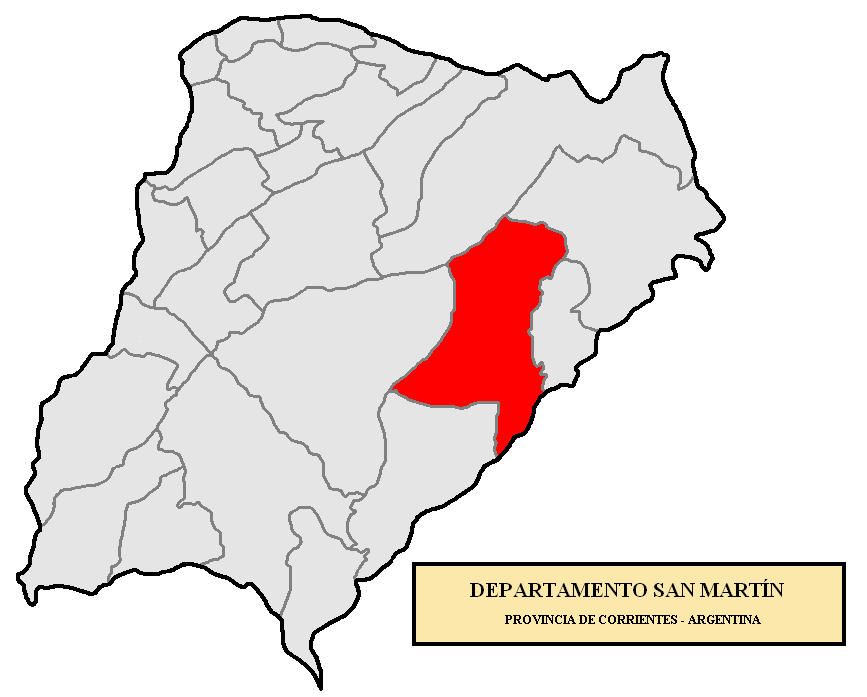
- location of San Martín Department in Corrientes Province
- Coordinates: 29°11′S 56°39′W
- Country: Argentina
- Seat: La Cruz

Area
  - Total: 6,385 km^{2} (2,465 sq mi)

Population (2001 census [INDEC])
  - Total: 12,236
  - Density: 1.916/km^{2} (4.963/sq mi)
- Postal Code: W3346
- Area Code: 03772

San Martín Department is a department of Corrientes Province in Argentina.

The provincial subdivision has a population of about 12,236 inhabitants in an area of 6,385 km^{2} (2,465 sq mi), and its capital city is La Cruz.

== Settlements ==
- Colonia Carlos Pellegrini
- Guaviraví
- La Cruz
- Yapeyú
