= San Luis del Palmar =

San Luis del Palmar Sán Lui Palmár Pegua (Guarani)
- Town
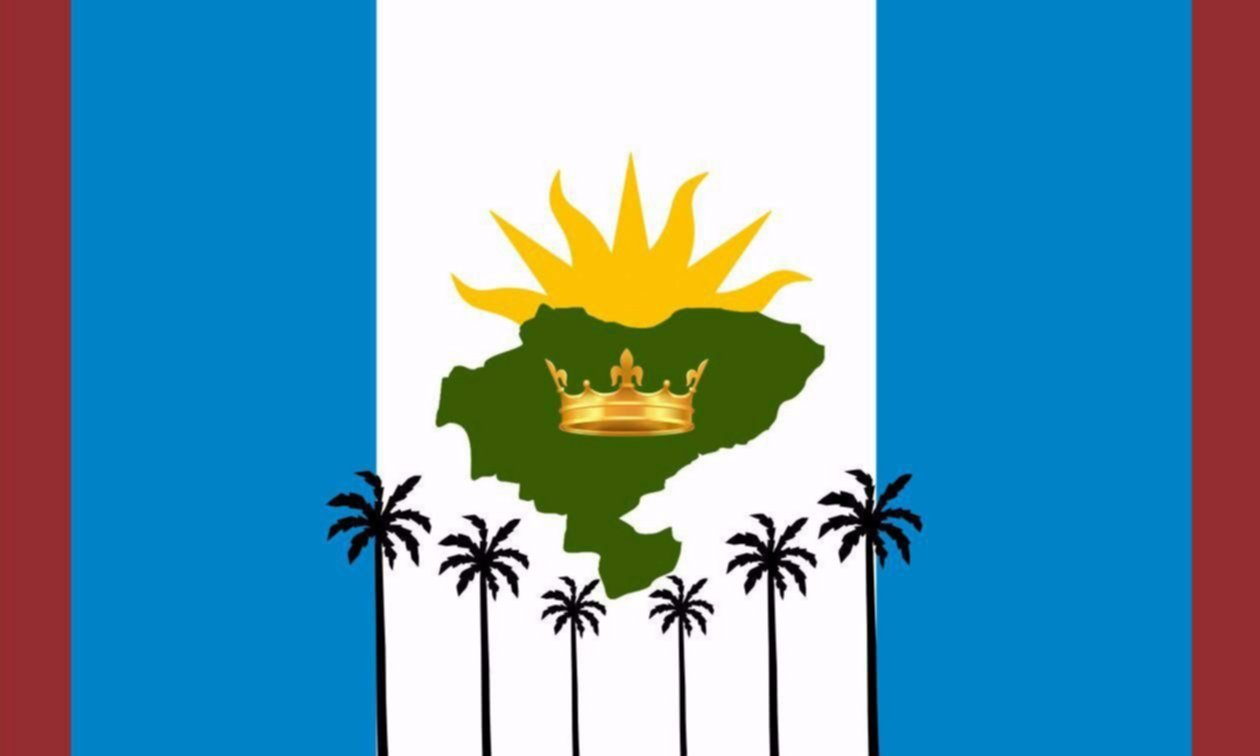
- Flag

- Location of San Luis del Palmar in Argentina
- Coordinates: 27°31′S 58°34′W
- Country: Argentina
- Province: Corrientes
- Department: San Luis del Palmar
- Elevation: 56 m (184 ft)

Population
  - Total: 15,347
- Time zone: UTC−3 (ART)
- CPA base: W3403
- Dialing code: +54 3783

San Luis del Palmar (Guarani: Sán Lui Palmár Pegua) is a town in Corrientes Province, Argentina. It is the head town of the San Luis del Palmar Department.

From 1912 until 1927 San Luis del Palmar had a railway station on the Ferrocarril Económico Correntino narrow gauge railway between Corrientes and Mburucuyá
