= Yapeyú, Corrientes =

Yapeyú
- Town
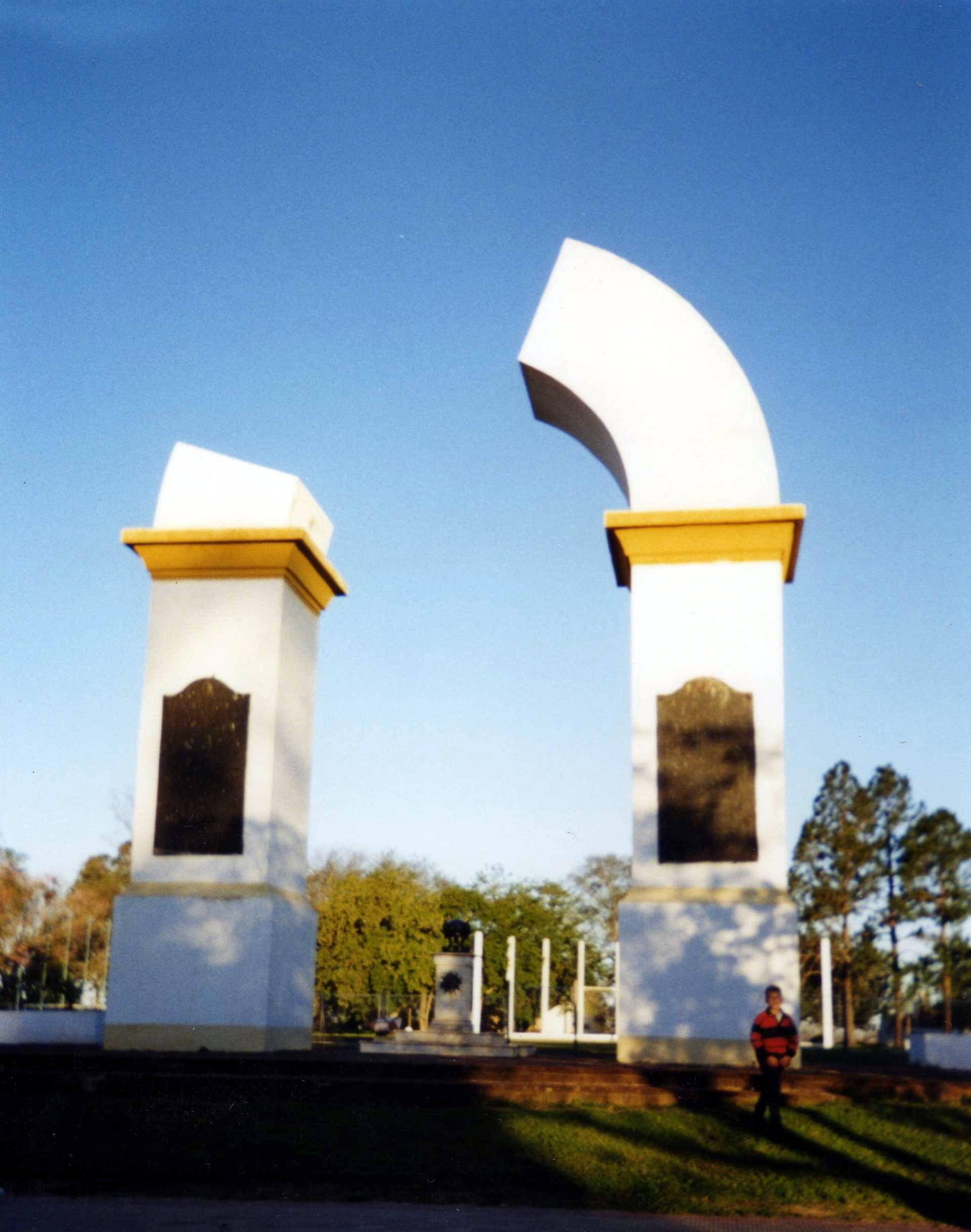
- Arco Trunco (English: Truncated Arch)

- Location of Yapeyú in Argentina
- Coordinates: 29°28′S 56°50′W
- Country: Argentina
- Province: Corrientes
- Department: San Martín
- Elevation: 54 m (177 ft)

Population
  - Total: 2,124
- Demonym: Yapeyuense
- Time zone: UTC−3 (ART)
- CPA base: W3231
- Dialing code: +54 3772

Yapeyú is a town in the province of Corrientes, Argentina, in the San Martín Department. It has about 2,000 inhabitants as per the 2001 census [INDEC], and it is known throughout the country because it was the birthplace of General José de San Martín (1778–1850), hero of the War of Independence. One of its notable monuments is the Arco Trunco.

== Etymology ==
The word Yapeyú comes from the Guaraní language and means "ripe fruit"; in other times, it was also the name of the river that is called today Guaviraví. Presbyter Eduardo J. Maldonado considers it a combination of the guaraní words "Yaye" ("The place where") and "Peyú" ("blowing of the wind"). Under this perspective, "Yapeyú" would mean in the Guaraní language "the place where the wind blows".

== History ==
The town was founded on December 4, 1626 by the Jesuit Pedro Romero, who gave it the name Villa de Nuestra Señora de los Santos Reyes Magos y Yapeyú. The town was one of the 30 missions established at the beginning of the 17th century which were destroyed in 1817 by the Portuguese army. The town was later rebuilt, and the ruins of the little fortress, which by the end of the 18th century had been the home of Lt. Juan de San Martín and his wife, Gregoria Matorras, were preserved.

== Notable people ==
- Reinaldo Gorno (1918–1994), long-distance runner

== Bibliography ==
- Galasso, Norberto (2009). Seamos Libres y lo demás no importa nada. Buenos Aires: Colihue. ISBN 978-950-581-779-5.
