= La Cruz, Corrientes =

La Cruz Kurusu
- Town
- Location of La Cruz in Argentina
- Coordinates: 28°11′S 56°39′W
- Country: Argentina
- Province: Corrientes
- Department: San Martín
- Elevation: 51 m (167 ft)

Population
  - Total: 8,591
- Demonym: cruceño
- Time zone: UTC−3 (ART)
- CPA base: W3346
- Dialing code: +54 3772

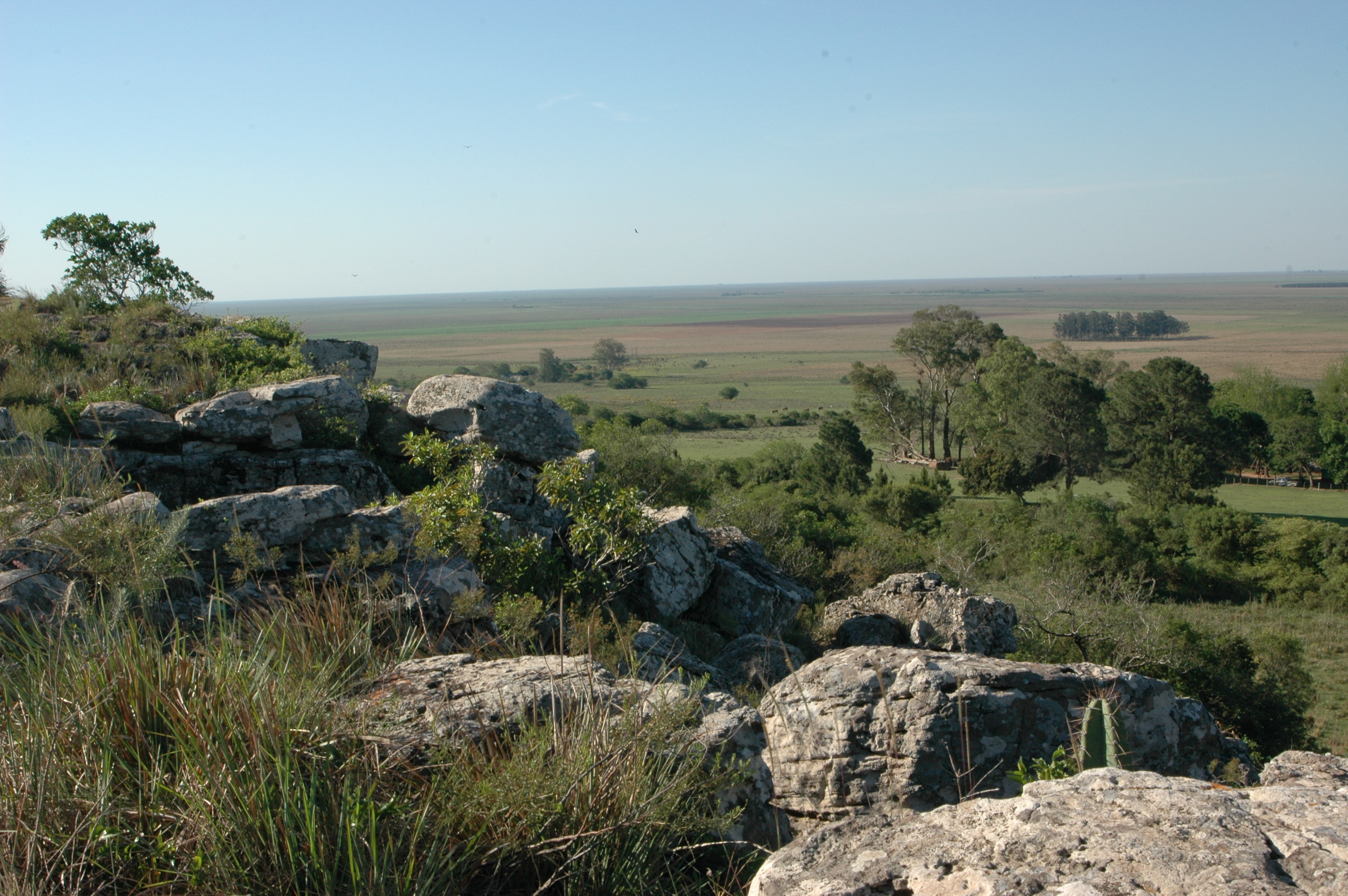
La Cruz, Provincia de Corrientes, Argentina

La Cruz (Guarani: Kurusu) is a town in Corrientes Province, Argentina. It is the capital of San Martín Department, Corrientes.

La Cruz was founded in 1630.

== See also ==
- La Cruz
