= Iberá Wetlands =

South American Wetlands

Coordinates: 28.600°S 57.817°W

Iberá Wetlands Esteros del Iberá Yno'õ Y Vera
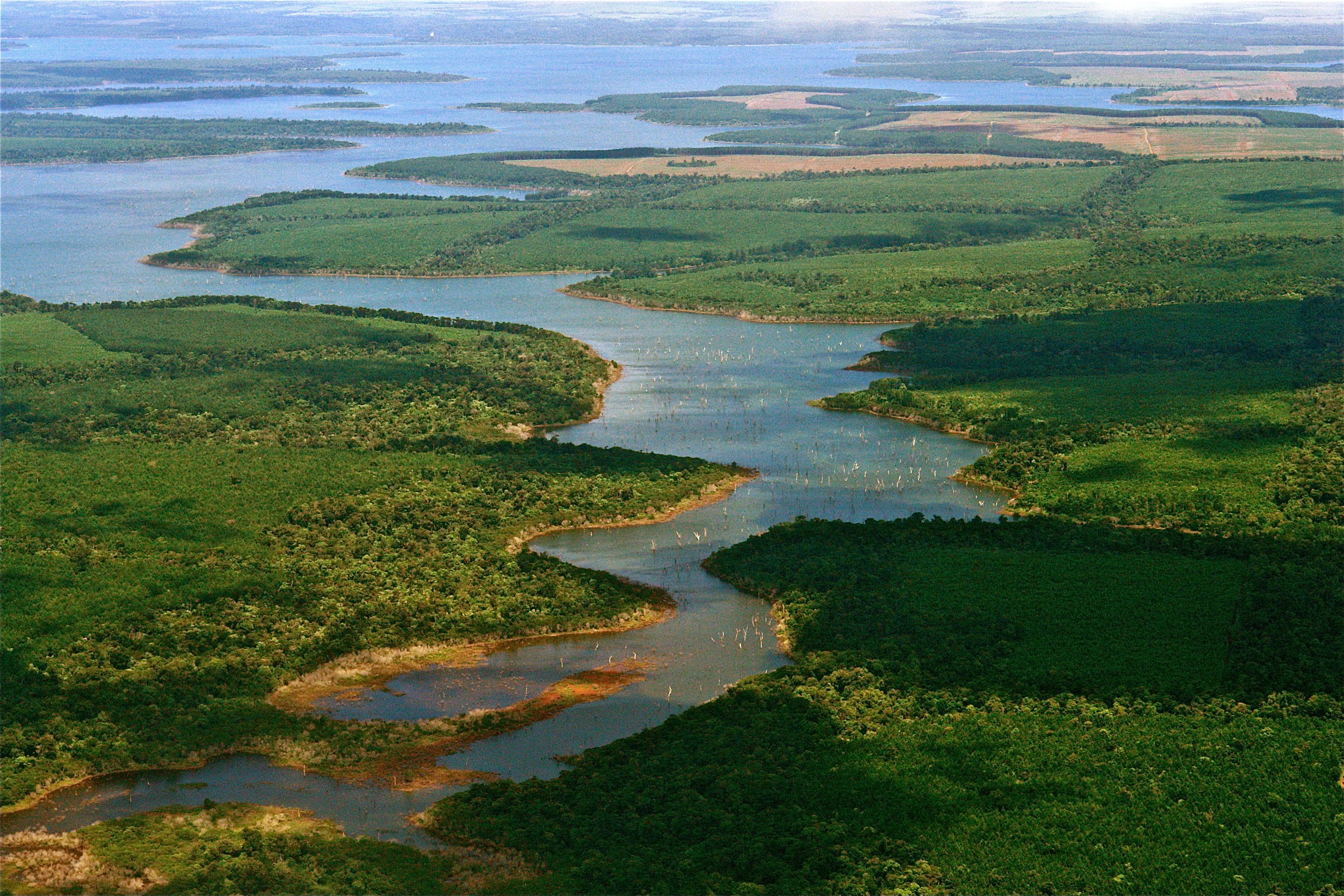
- Aerial view of the Iberá Provincial Reserve

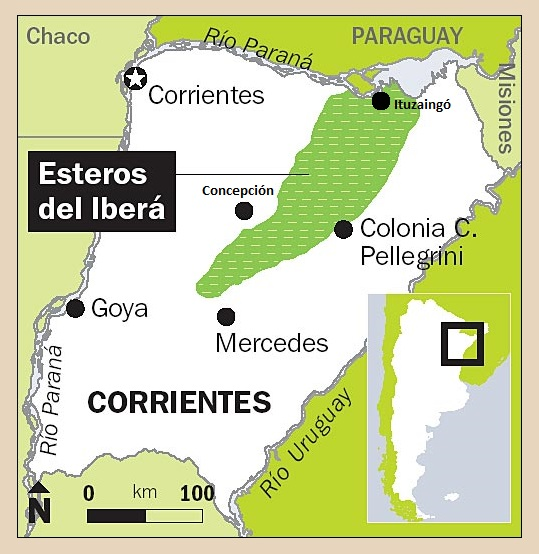

Geography
- Location: Argentina
- Area: 20,000 km^{2} (7,700 sq mi)

The Iberá Wetlands (Spanish: Esteros del Iberá, from Guaraní ý berá: "bright water") are a mix of swamps, bogs, stagnant lakes, lagoons, natural slough, and courses of water in the center and center-north of the province of Corrientes, Argentina.

Iberá is one of the most important freshwater reservoirs in South America and the second-largest wetland in the world after Pantanal in Brazil. It is of pluvial origin, with a total area of 15,000–20,000 km^{2} (5,800–7,700 sq mi).

Since 1982, part of the wetland is included within a provincial protected area, the Iberá Provincial Reserve, which comprises about 13,000 km^{2} (5,000 sq mi), the largest of such areas in Argentina. There are ongoing plans to further up its protection status to national park.

It is home to a wide variety of fauna, including capybara, 60 species of reptiles including caimans and snakes, frogs, anteaters, otters, several species of deer, and over 350 species of birds. The region was once threatened by poaching, cattle ranching, and foresting which threatened several of these species, but thanks to a rewilding initiative, several species have been re-introduced, including the jaguar. This initiative also sought to reorient the economy of the area to be more focused on tourism, in order to keep the newly reintroduced species populations safe.

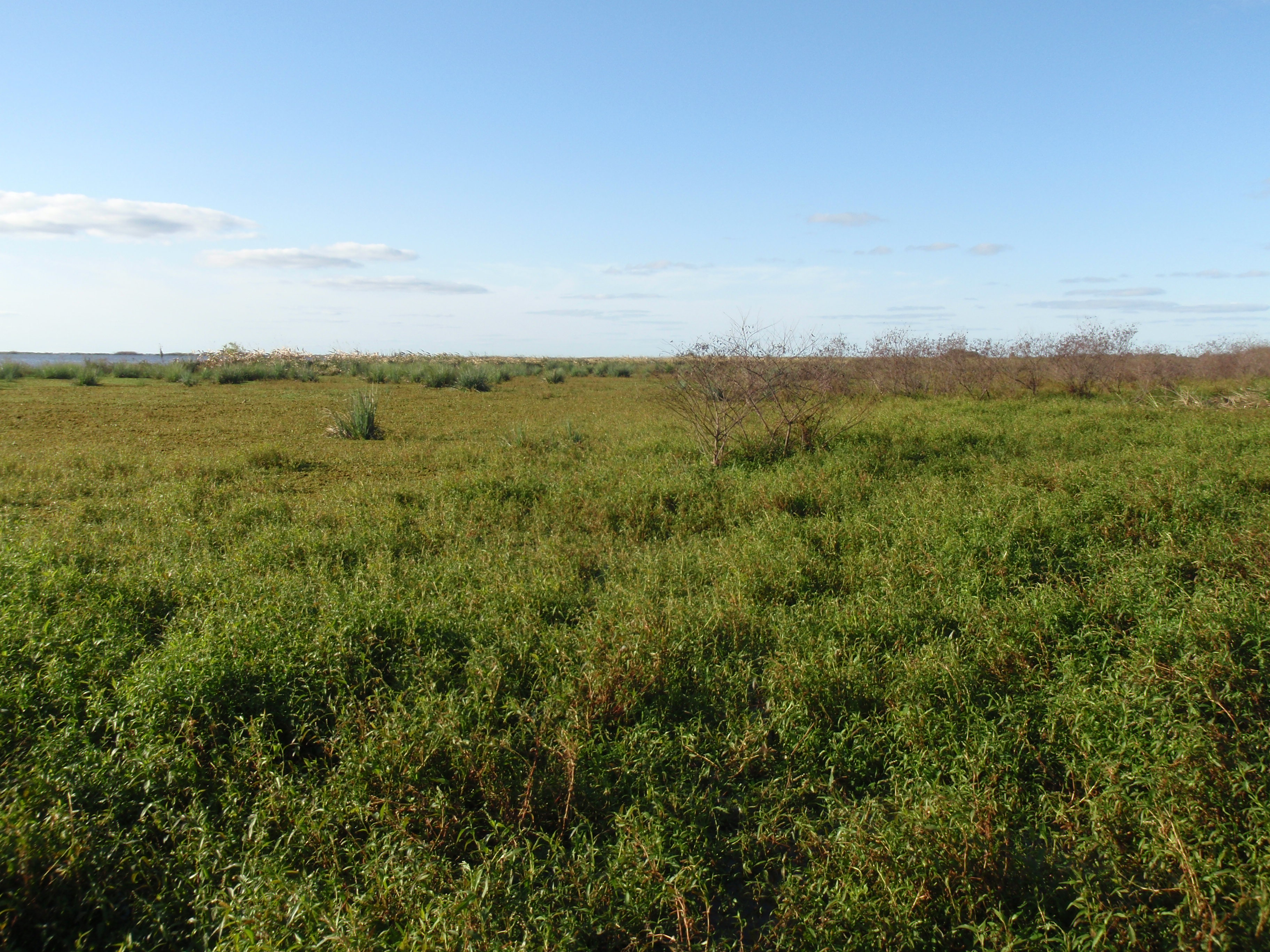
Esteros del Iberá Marsh

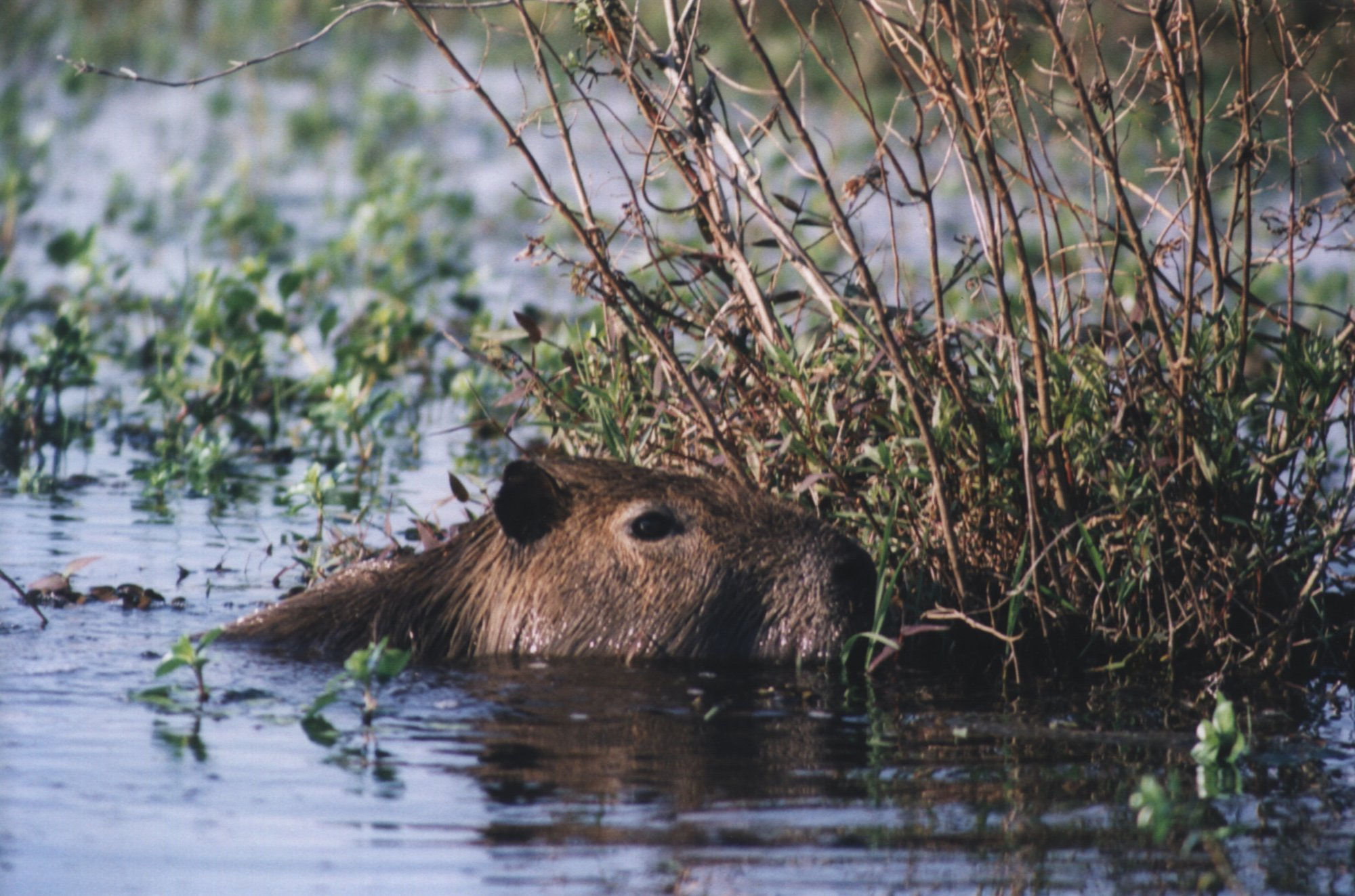
Capybara at Iberá

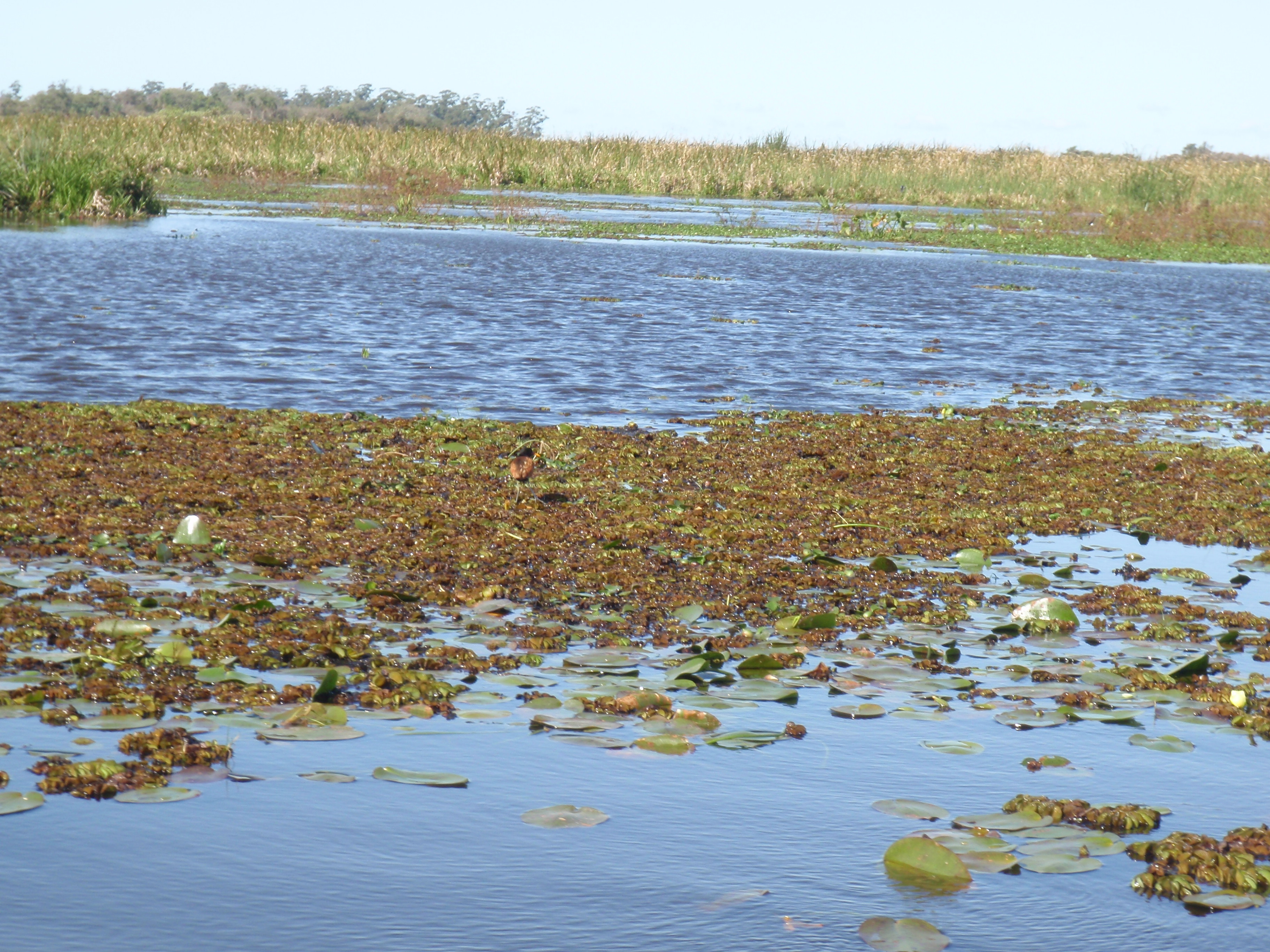
Esteros del Iberá Lagoon

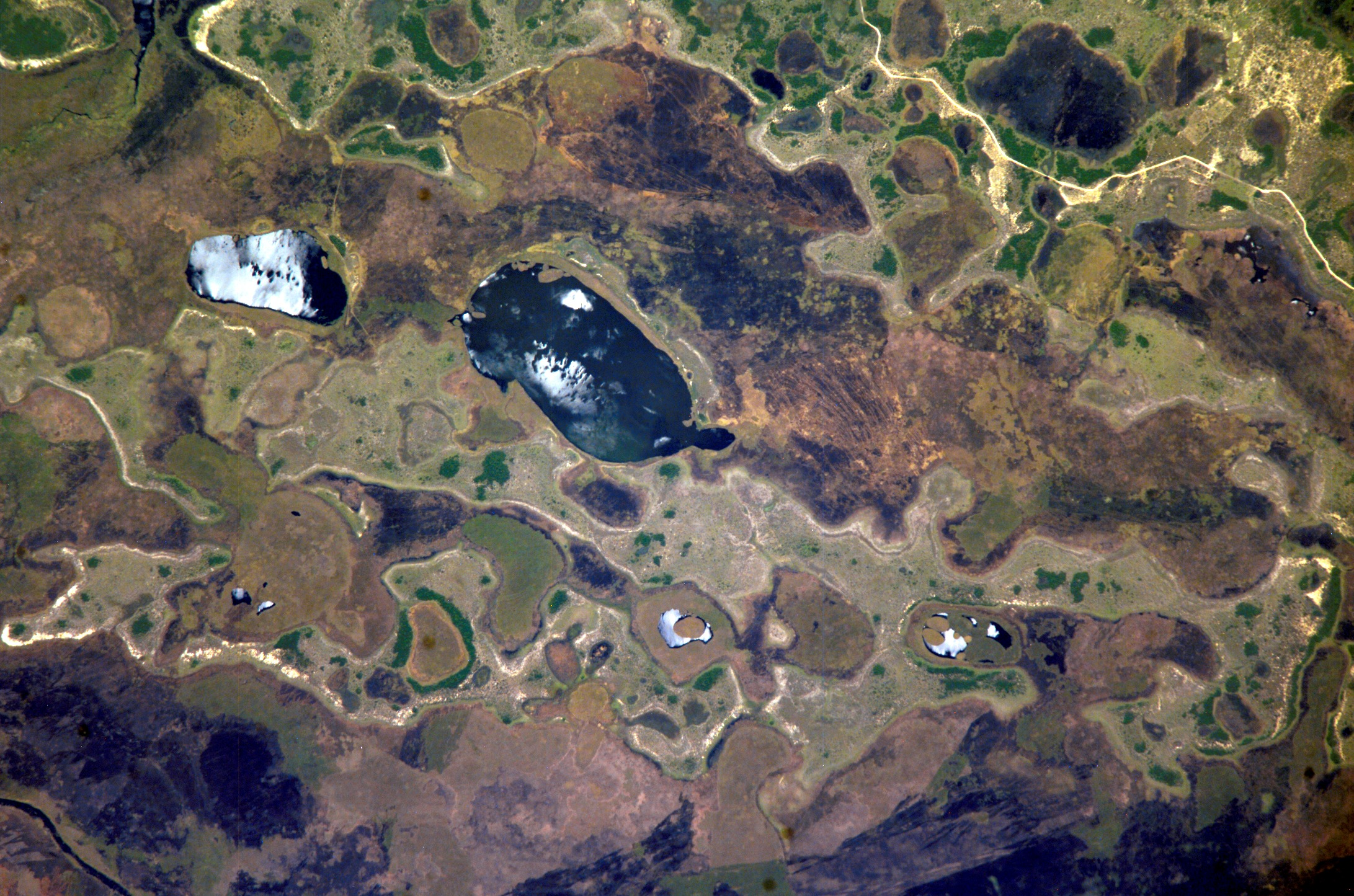
Some lakes in the Iberá Wetlands, reflecting sunlight

== See also ==
- Iberá Provincial Reserve
- Okavango Delta
- Wetland
