= Corrientes Province =

Northeastern province of Argentina

Corrientes Taragui (Guarani)
- Province
- Province of Corrientes; Provincia de Corrientes (Spanish); Taragui Tetãmini (Guarani)
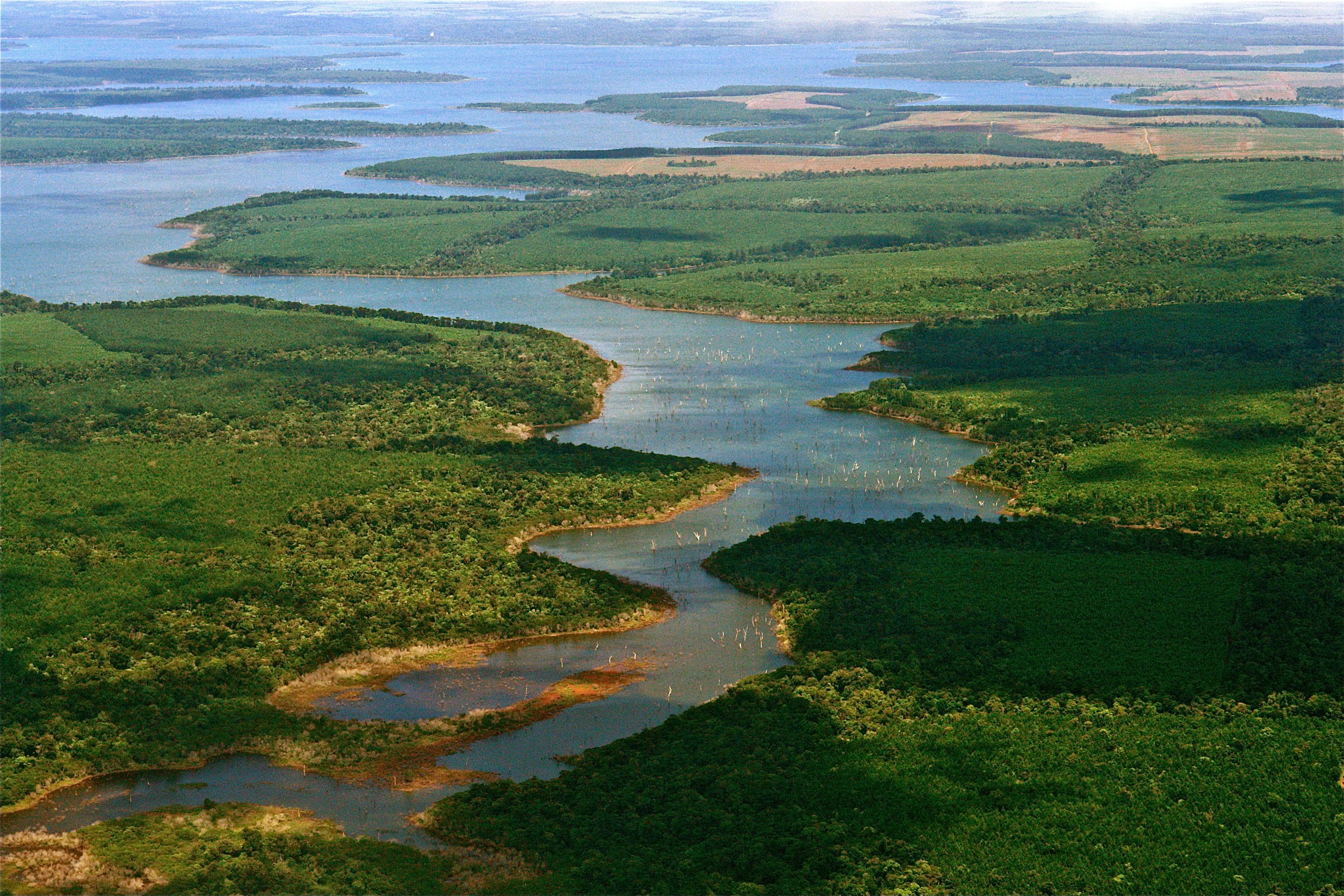
- The Iberá Wetlands

- Flag Coat of arms
- Nicknames: Taragüí/Taragui; La Novia del Paraná (The Bride of Paraná); Corazón del Nordeste (Heart of the Northeast)
- Motto(s): Patria, libertad y constitucion (Guarani: Tetã, Sãso ha Rekovoñaguasu) (Homeland, freedom and constitution)
- Location of Corrientes within Argentina
- Coordinates: 28.66°S 57.63°W
- Country: Argentina
- Capital: Corrientes
- Departments: 25
- Municipalities: 67

Government
  - Governor: Juan Pablo Valdés
  - Vice Governor: Pedro Braillard Poccard (PPC)
  - Legislature: Senate (15); Chamber of Deputies of Corrientes (30)
  - Deputies: 7
  - National Senators: Carlos Espínola (FDT); Mercedes Valenzuela (JXC); Eduardo Vischi (JXC)

Area Ranked 16th
  - Total: 88,199 km^{2} (34,054 sq mi)

Population (2022 census)
  - Total: 1,197,553
  - Rank: 10th
  - Density: 13.578/km^{2} (35.166/sq mi)
- Demonym(s): Correntine correntino (Spanish) taraguigua (Guarani)

GDP
  - Total: US$ 13.0 billion
  - Per capita: US$ 11,500
- Time zone: UTC−3 (ART)
- ISO 3166 code: AR-W
- Languages: Spanish (official); Guarani (co-official)
- HDI (2021): 0.839 very high (18th)
- Website: www.corrientes.gov.ar

Corrientes (Spanish pronunciation: [koˈrjentes], lit. ‘currents’ or ‘streams’; Guarani: Taragui), officially the Province of Corrientes (Spanish: Provincia de Corrientes; Guarani: Taragui Tetãmini) is a province in northeast Argentina, in the Mesopotamia region. It is surrounded by (from the north, clockwise): Paraguay, Misiones, Brazil, Uruguay, and the provinces of Entre Rios, Santa Fe and Chaco. With an area of 88,199 km², it ranks sixteenth in territorial size among Argentina’s provinces.

From the historical perspective of the construction of the Argentine State, it is one of the oldest provinces in Argentine territory and one of the fourteen founding provinces of the Argentine Confederation.

In 2004, the Guaraní language was declared an “alternative official language,” reflecting the bilingual character that distinguishes the province.

== History ==
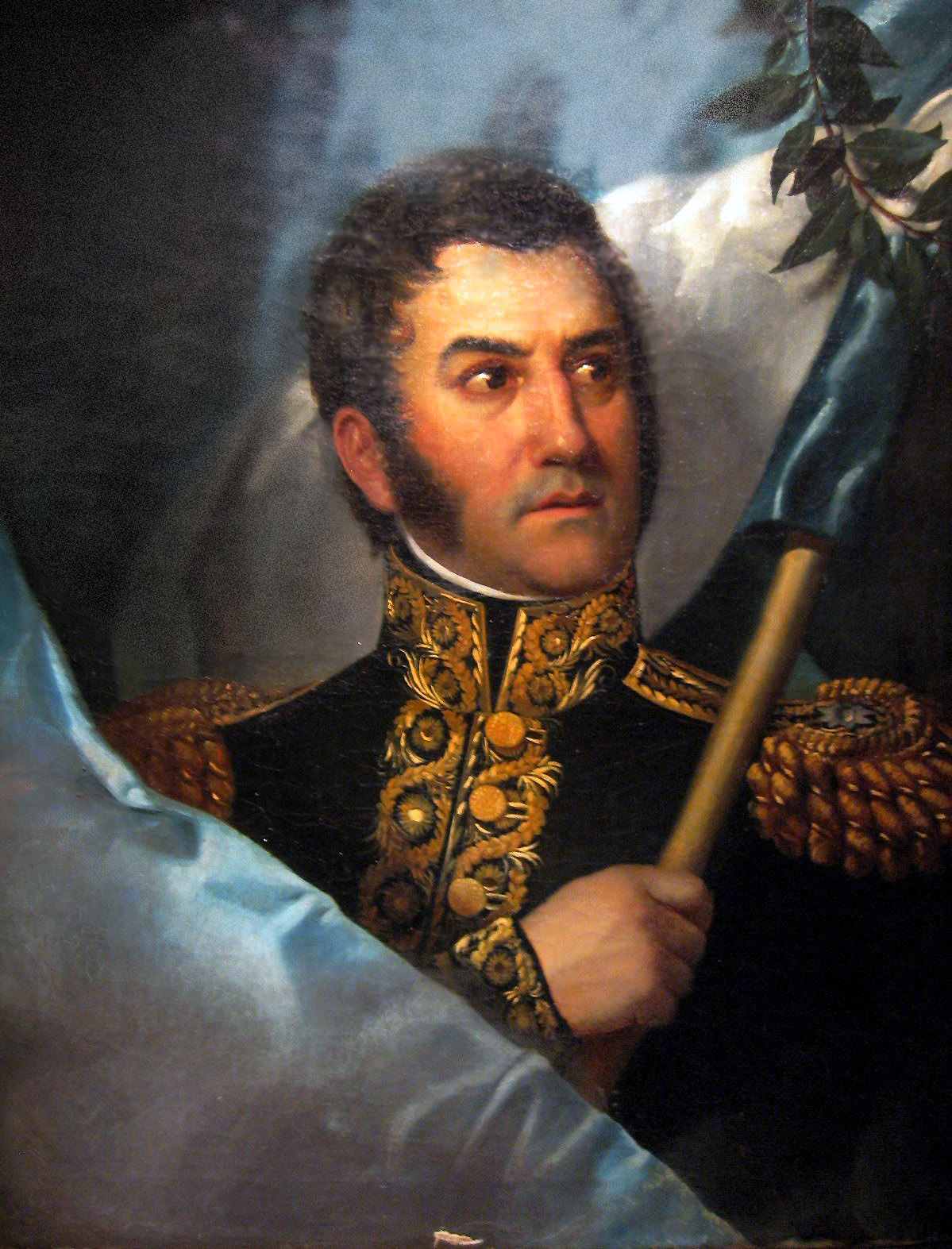
José de San Martín, the father of the Argentine homeland.

Before the arrival of the Spanish conquest, the Kaingang, Charrua and Guaraní lived in a big area that also covered most of the current province of Corrientes. The city of Corrientes was founded on 3 April 1588 by Juan Torres de Vera y Aragón as a mid-stop between Asunción and Buenos Aires; the city flourished thanks to the traffic from the route. Jesuits erected missions in the north of the province, where they dedicated themselves to the expansion of the faith. In the wars of independence from Spain, Corrientes joined Artigas' Liga de los Pueblos Libres (1814–1820). The attack of Paraguayan forces on the province in 1865 marked the start of the War of the Triple Alliance.

In 1919 the National University of the Littoral was founded, which in 1956 became the National University of the Northeast.

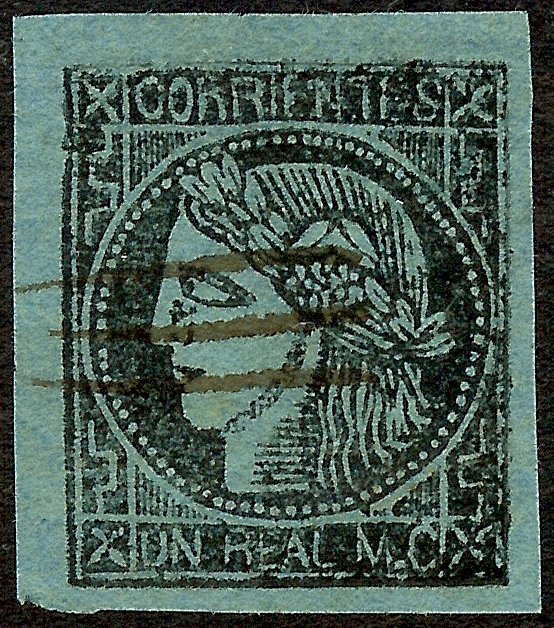
Corrientes 1 real stamp (1856)

Corrientes is legendary in the world of philately for the postage stamps it issued from 1856 to 1880. These are among the very early or "classic" postage stamps of the world (the first, from Great Britain, were issued in 1840; those by the United States in 1847). The Corrientes stamps were close copies of the first issue of stamps from France, which depicted the profile head of Ceres, the Roman goddess of agriculture, and were individually crudely engraved by hand, so that each die is noticeably different, and were printed in small sheets. The first issues, from 1856 to 1860, bore the denomination in the lower panel; in 1860, the value panel was erased; the different denominations thereafter being indicated by the color of the paper used. As locally produced "primitives", the early Corrientes stamps have long been prized by collectors. After 1880, stamps of Argentina were used.

For much of the 19th and 20th centuries, politics in Corrientes were dominated by the Romero Feris family, prominent local landowners who still control most of the province's tobacco output. During most of this time, the Romero Ferises created one of Argentina's most bloated government payrolls (over 10% of total employment) and suppressed dissent and efforts at even modest land reform. Following contentious election results in 1991, however, public protest forced President Carlos Menem to remove Governor Raúl "Tato" Romero Feris from office and, though he was elected mayor of the province's capital in 1997, Romero Feris was ultimately indicted for embezzlement of public funds in 1999. He was sentenced to seven years in prison in May 2002.

Corrientes had a significant impact in national politics in subsequent years. A UCR-led alliance defeated the Romero Feris machine in the 2001 governor's race, but the Corrientes UCR's continued support for President Néstor Kirchner led to a rebuke from the national committee of the UCR itself, and this triggered a revolt from the Corrientes chapter of the party, as well as a number of others' (notably in Mendoza Province). These differences led to the appearance that year of "K" Radicals – UCR governors and other lawmakers allied to President Kirchner.

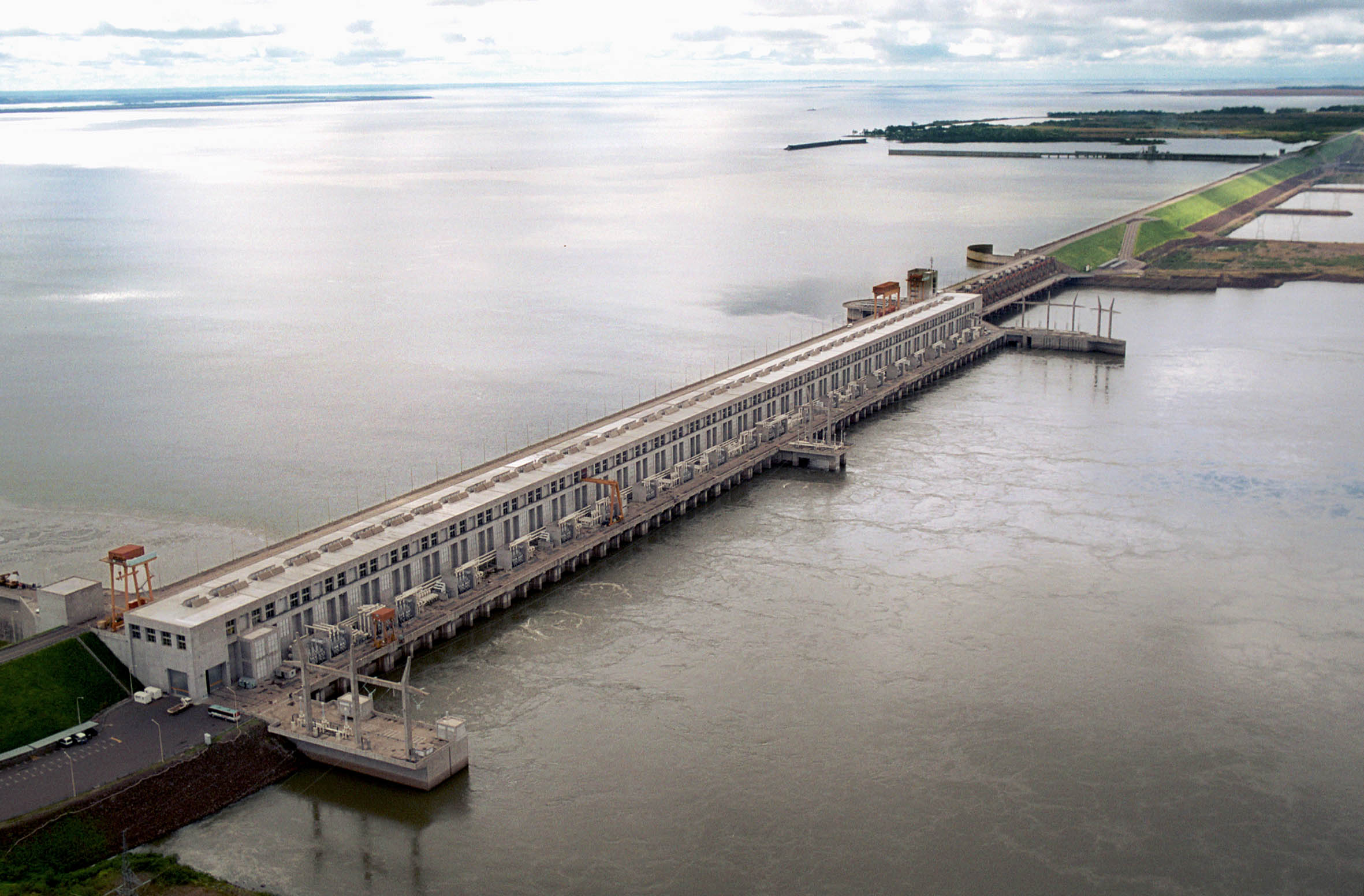
The Yacyretá Dam.

The northeastern tip of Corrientes Province was chosen as the site for Yacyretá Dam following an agreement between President Juan Perón and Paraguayan President Alfredo Stroessner in 1974. Yacyretá, whose 20-year-long construction and US$11 billion cost far exceeded initial estimates, is one of the largest hydroelectric dams in the world. Currently, an agreement is being pursued with Paraguay which would allow reservoir expansion works that could double the facility's current installed electric capacity of 4,050 MW.

== Culture ==
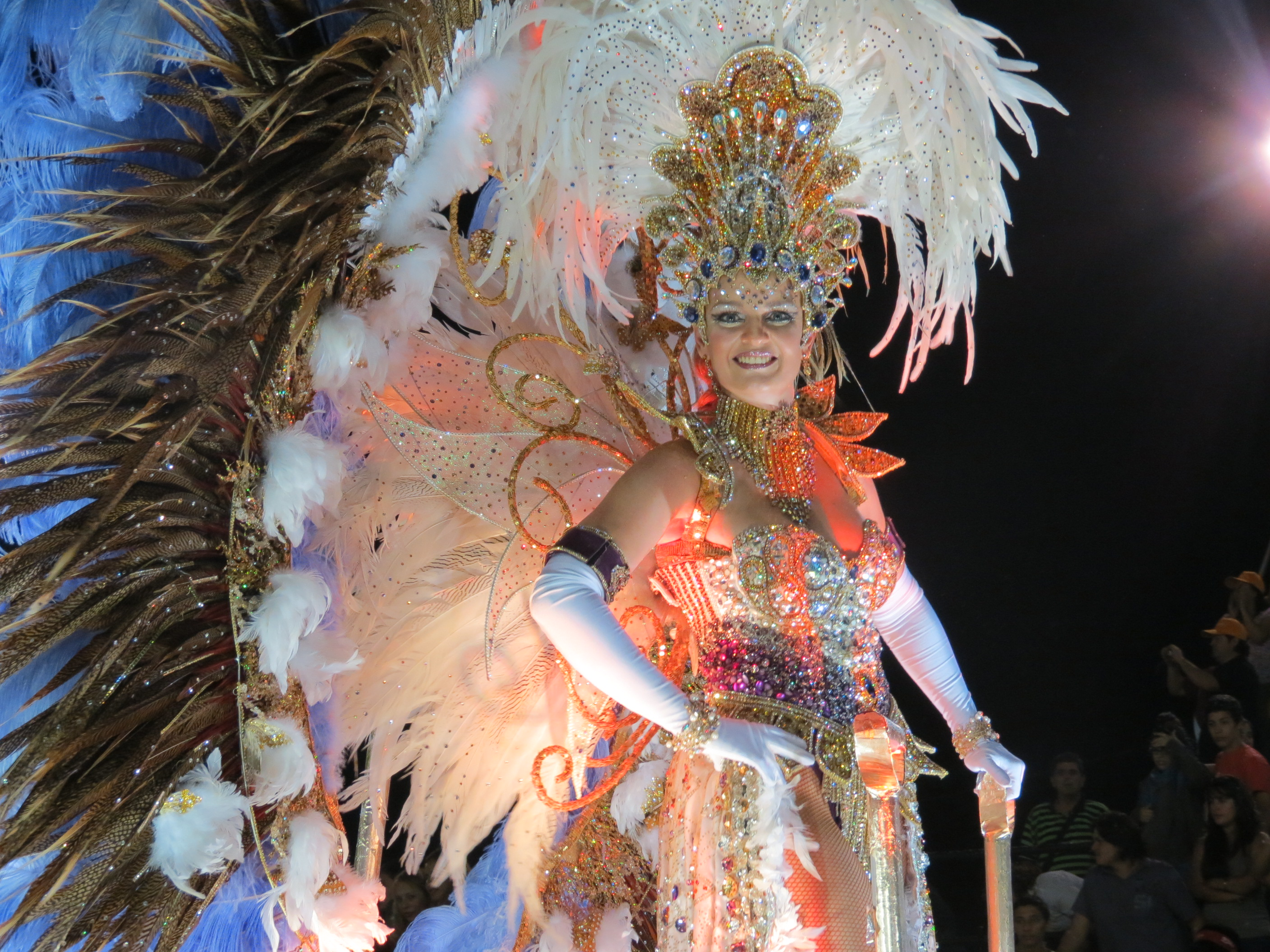
Woman parading in the Corrientes carnival in 2012.

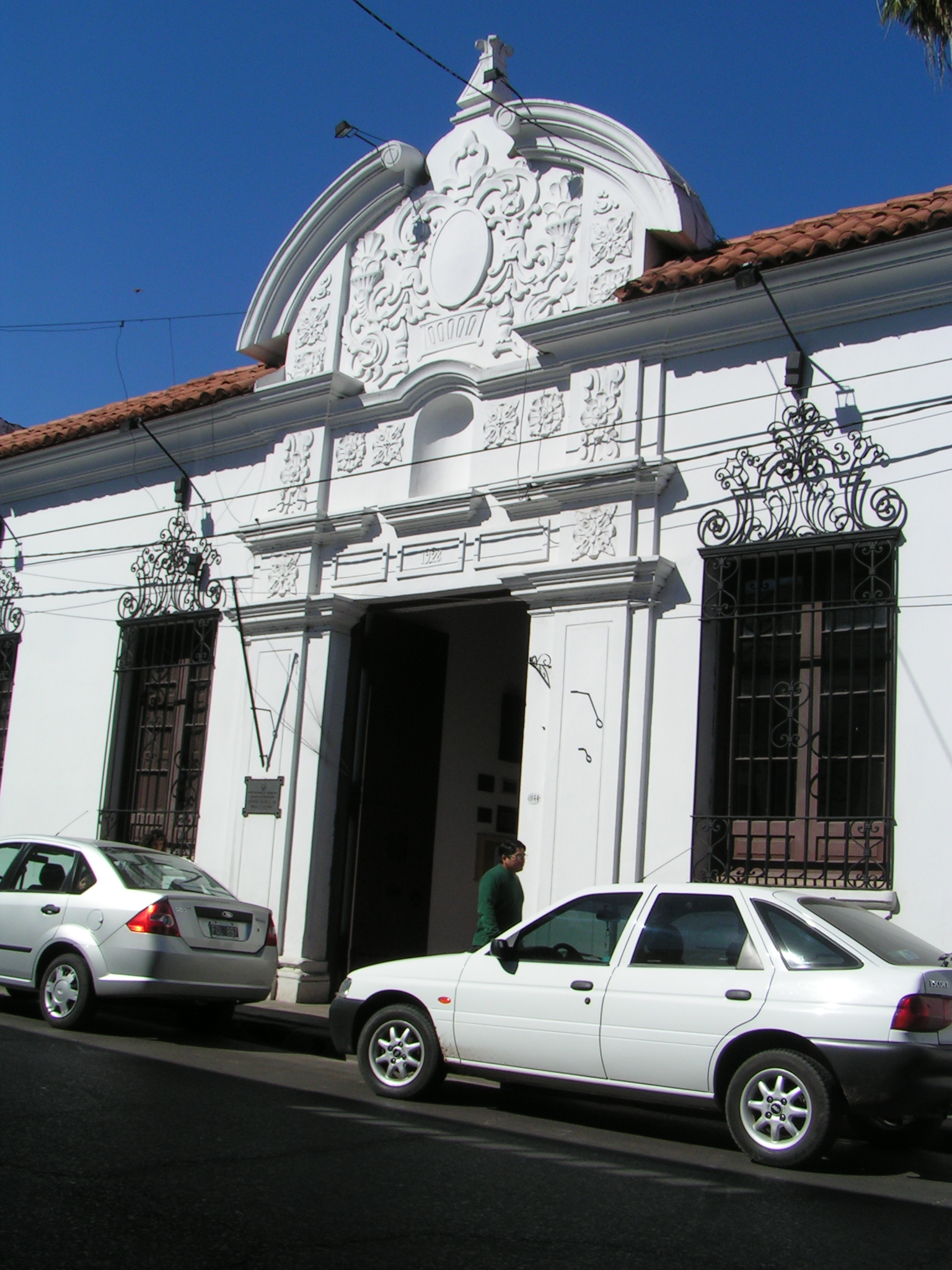
Corrientes Historical Museum.

Culture in Corrientes has been primarily informed and influenced by its European (Spanish and Volga German) and Guarani roots; an example of this is the chamamé genre of music.

Famous correntinos were independence hero General Don José de San Martín (born in 1778 in Yapeyú) and Juan Bautista Cabral (born in Saladas), who (according to popular legend) died for the general in the Battle of San Lorenzo.

Tourist destinations in the Corrientes Province include the Iberá Wetlands and the Mburucuyá National Park.

=== Official languages ===
On 22 October 2004, Provincial Law No. 5598 (Decree 2326/2004) declared Guaraní to be an official language of Corrientes, alongside Spanish. It was the first Argentine province to officialize a language other than Spanish, followed in 2010 by Chaco.

== Geography ==
Köppen climate map of Corrientes Province

Corrientes is surrounded by two rivers – the Uruguay River to the east, and the Paraná River to the northwest – that contour the shape of the province. The low shore of the Paraná produces frequent floodings. After a specially destructive one in 1982, a protective system has been started with the construction of barriers.

The province is for the most part a plain, with the highest points in the east. To the west, a series of descending platforms go down to the Paraná River. The Iberá Wetlands, an area of lagoons and swamps, is a vast depression from volcanic flow, covered later with fluvial and eolic sediments.

=== Climate ===
The climate is predominantly subtropical with no dry season. The mean annual temperature is 20 °C (68 °F) with monthly mean temperatures ranging from 14 °C (57 °F) in July to 26 °C (79 °F) in January. Temperatures are hot for most of the year while precipitation is abundant and evenly distributed throughout the year. There are four seasons: winter, spring, summer, and autumn. Winters are short although occasional incursions of cold, polar air from the south can produce frosts. In contrast, temperatures during summer can reach to 35 to 40 °C (95 to 104 °F). Mean annual precipitation ranges from 1,100 to 1,900 millimetres (43 to 75 in) which decreases from northeast to southwest. Autumn is the rainiest season while winter is the driest.

== Demographics ==
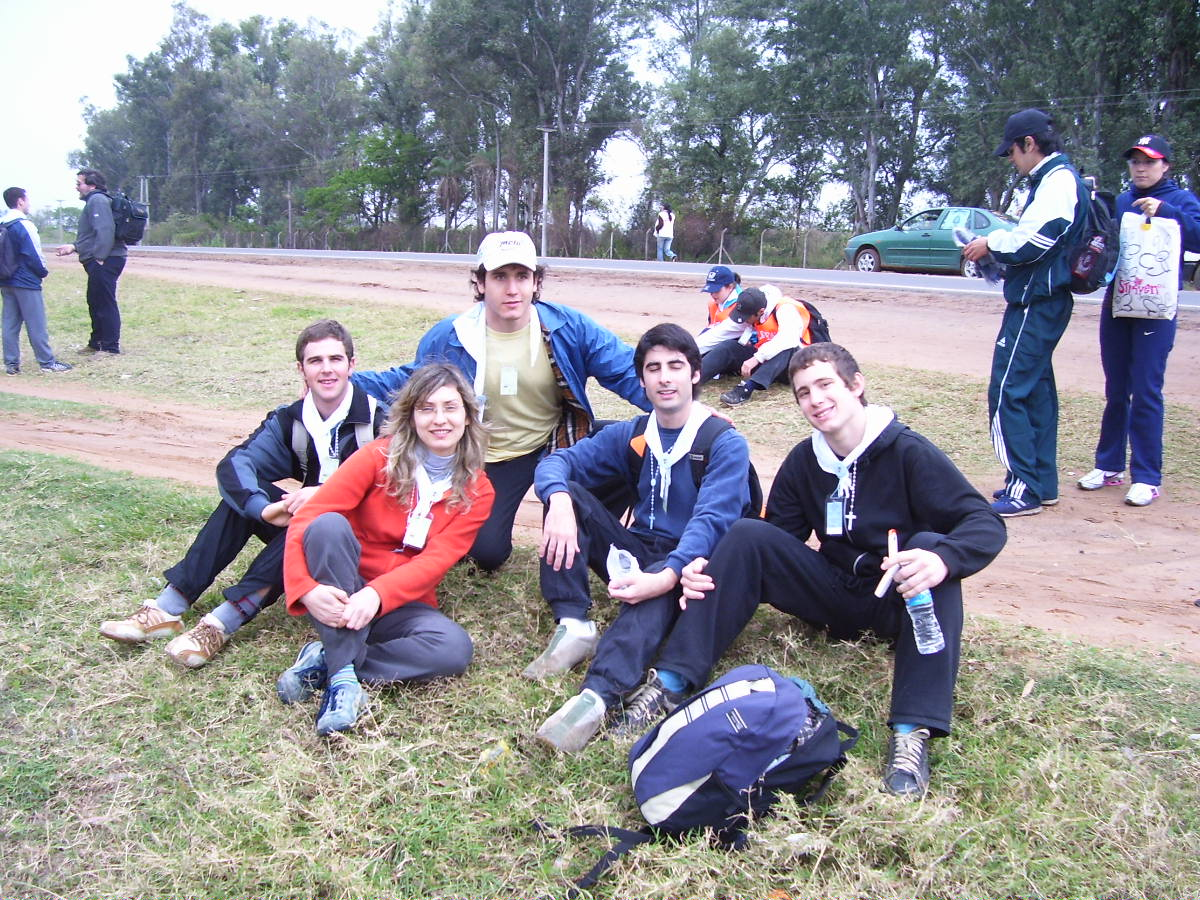
Young people from Corrientes making a pilgrimage to Itatí.

According to the 2022 Argentine national census, the Province of Corrientes has 1,197,553 inhabitants.

Racial composition according to the provincial censuses of Corrientes 1814–1833
| Years | White (Criollo and Castizo) | | Other groups | | Total |
| Years | # | % | # | % | Total |
|---|---|---|---|---|---|
| 1814 | 21,370 | 70.80% | 8,814 | 29.20% | 30,184 |
| 1820 | ▲28,110 | ▲76.60% | ▼8,587 | ▼23.40% | ▲36,697 |
| 1833 | ▲48,693 | ▲87.11% | ▼7,204 | ▼12.89% | ▲55,897 |

== Economy ==
Corrientes, like much of the Argentine north, has long had a relatively underdeveloped economy. Its 2006 output was estimated at US$4.2 billion (which shall be around US$6.7 billion in 2011, according to Argentina's economic growth), or, US$4,540 per capita (around US$6,600 in 2011), nearly 40% below the national average.

Agriculture is still one of the main activities in the province, adding 15% to its output. It is centred in citrus, tobacco, rice, tea, cotton and yerba mate, exported internationally. The timber industry uses 1,400 km^{2} of pine and eucalyptus forests.

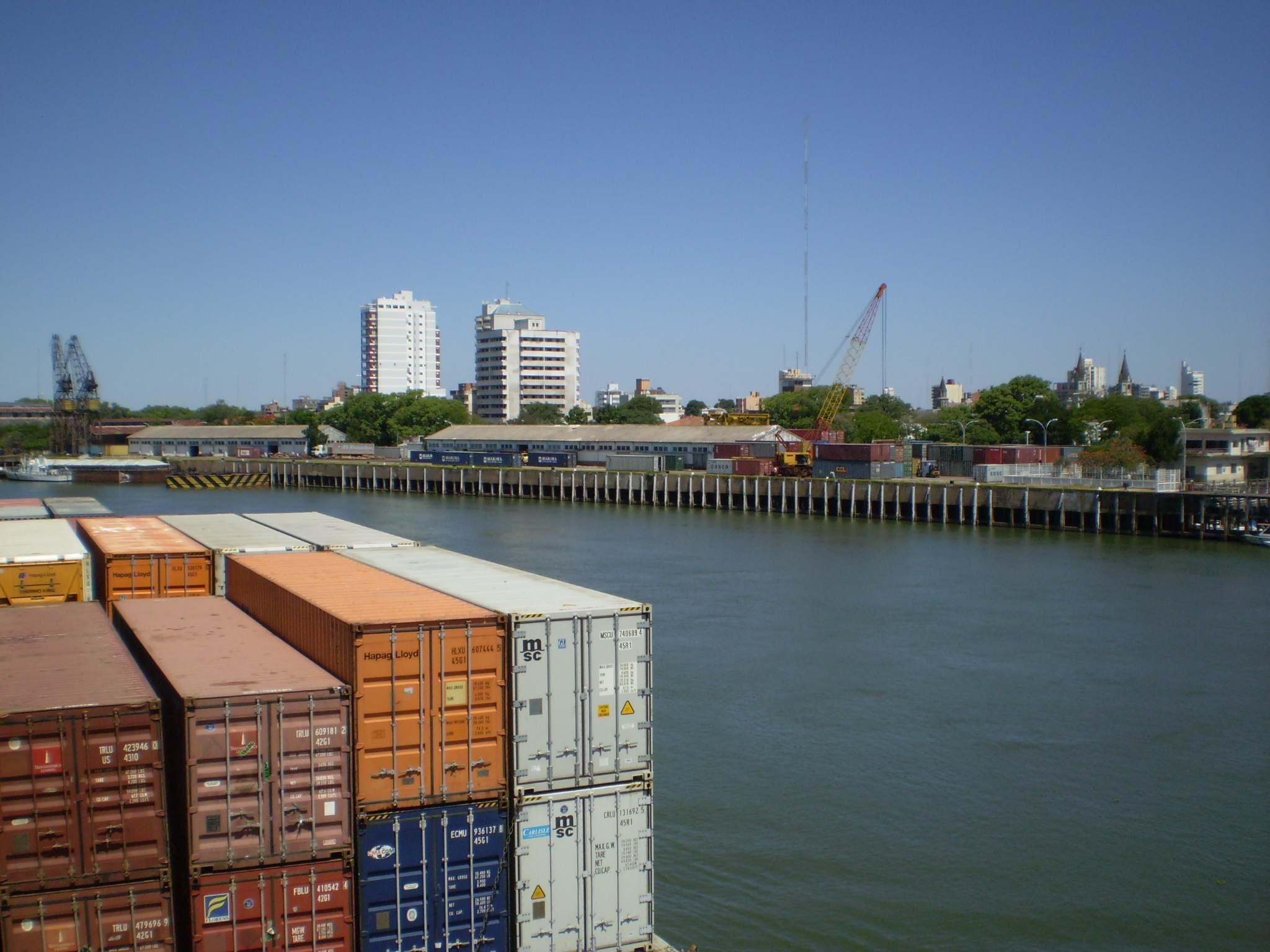
Port of Corrientes, on the Paraná River

Bovine cattle has problems standing the heat and the low quality of the grass specially in the north of the province. For that reason, the Brangus breed is the most common in the area. In the south, different breeds can be found. 70,000 km^{2} of the province's land are used for more than 4 million heads of cattle.

Among Corrientes' productive (non-services) activities, tobacco and its processing earns 45% of the province's gross income, food and derivates, 30%, and textiles, 16%.

On the Paraná River, near the city of Ituzaingó, the Yaciretá dam provides energy not only to the province, but to both Argentina and Paraguay.

Tourism has been growing in Corrientes Province due to the relevance that Esteros del Ibera has for ecotourism and birdwatching travelers. Iberá National Park was created in 2018. Golden dorado fishing has long attracted both local and outside tourism to Corrientes.

== Political division ==
The provincial government is divided into the usual three branches: the executive, headed by a popularly elected governor, who appoint the cabinet; the legislative; and the judiciary, headed by the Supreme Court. The legislative branch is a bicameral body composed of the Chamber of Deputies and the Senate. The Legislature is charged with introducing and passing local laws.

The Constitution of Corrientes Province forms the formal law of the province.

In Argentina, the most important law enforcement organization is the Argentine Federal Police but the additional work is carried out by the Corrientes Provincial Police.

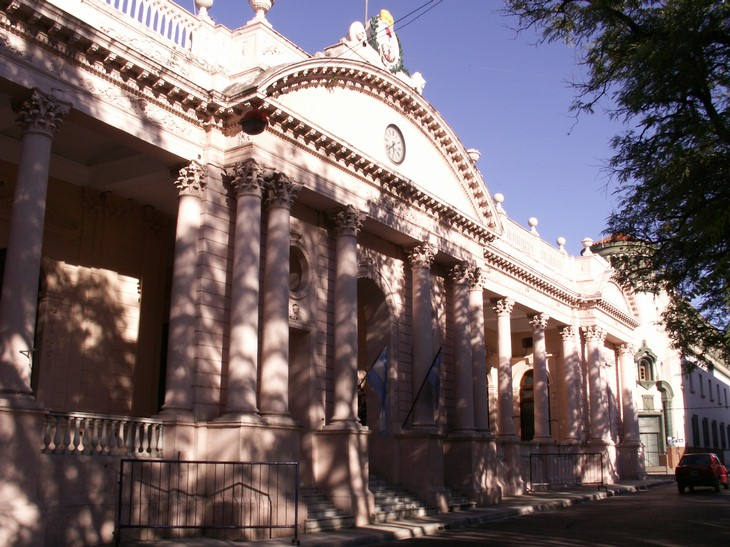
Governor's offices

The province is divided into 25 departments (departamentos):

Department (Capital)

1. Bella Vista Department (Bella Vista)
2. Berón de Astrada Department (Berón de Astrada)
3. Capital Department (Corrientes)
4. Concepción Department (Concepción)
5. Curuzú Cuatía Department (Curuzú Cuatiá)
6. Empedrado Department (Empedrado)
7. Esquina Department (Esquina)
8. General Alvear Department (Alvear)
9. General Paz Department (Nuestra Señora del Rosario de Caá Catí)
10. Goya Department (Goya)
11. Itatí Department (Itatí)
12. Ituzaingó Department (Ituzaingó)
13. Lavalle Department (Lavalle)
14. Mburucuyá Department (Mburucuyá)
15. Mercedes Department (Mercedes)
16. Monte Caseros Department (Monte Caseros)
17. Paso de los Libres Department (Paso de los Libres)
18. Saladas Department (Saladas)
19. San Cosme Department (San Cosme)
20. San Luis del Palmar Department (San Luis del Palmar)
21. San Martín Department (La Cruz)
22. San Miguel Department (San Miguel)
23. San Roque Department (San Roque)
24. Santo Tomé Department (Santo Tomé)
25. Sauce Department (Sauce)
