= Our Lady of Navigators =

Catholic devotional title of the Virgin Mary

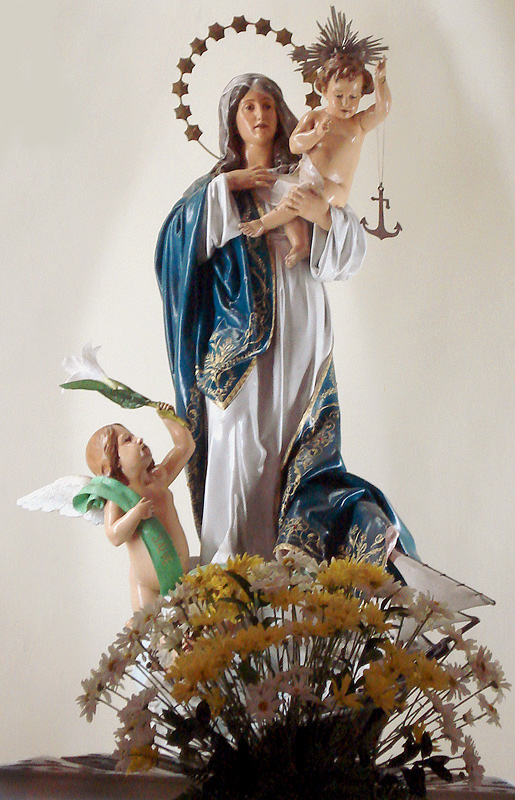
- Statue of Our Lady of Navigators at the Our Lady of Navigators church, Porto Alegre, Brazil
- Venerated in: Roman Catholic Church
- Feast: 2 February
- Attributes: Blessed Virgin Mary held by angels, Infant Jesus holding an anchor, mantle, jewelry, crown, halo of stars
- Patronage: Navigators, sailors, protection from storms

Our Lady of Navigators also known as Our Lady of Seafarers (Nossa Senhora dos Navegantes in Portuguese) is a devotional title given to the Virgin Mary by Roman Catholics. It is a widespread devotion in South America, especially in Brazil, where her holy day is celebrated on 2 February, it is an official holiday on the city of Porto Alegre. Several churches in Brazil are dedicated to Our Lady of Navigators.

== History ==
The devotion to Our Lady of Navigators has its roots in Portugal, where she is considered the patron saint of navigators, fishermen, and sailors praying for a safe return to their homes. They saw the Virgin Mary as their protector during storms and other hazards.

The Bandra Fair in Mumbai has been celebrated for about 300 years, and began as a commemoration of the fortuitous finding of a statue of Our Lady of Navigators to replace one damaged by Arab pirates at Mount Mary Church. Some sixty years later the original statue was repaired and that of Our Lady of Navigators returned to the nearby St. Andrew's Church, Mumbai.

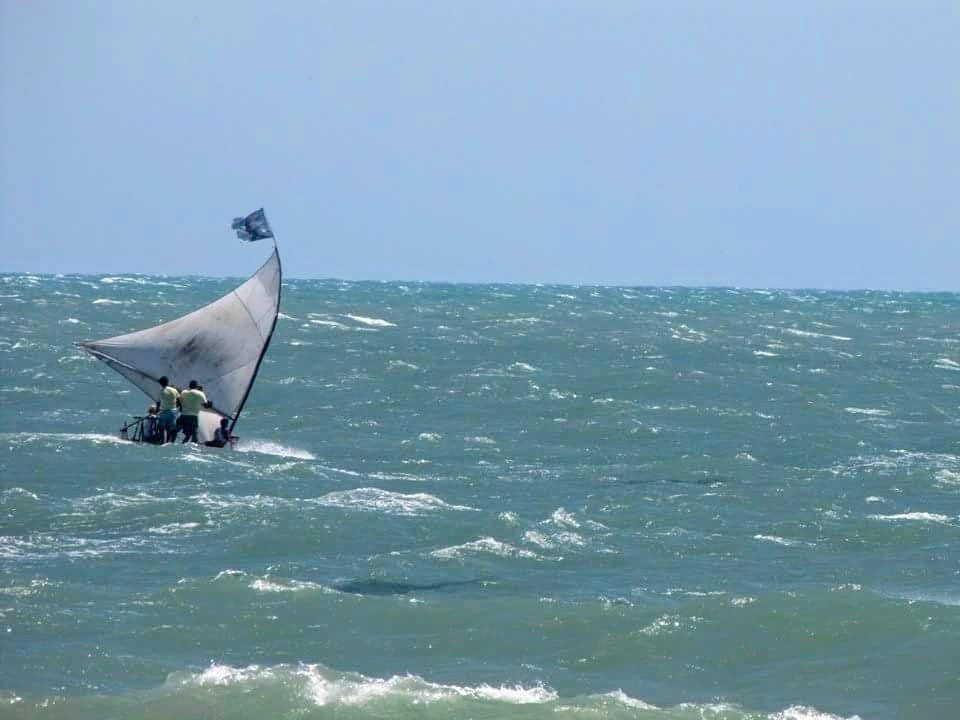
A jangada takes part in the Procissão no Mar in Guajiru.

The first statue in South America was brought from Portugal to Brazil. In Brazil, the Procissão no Mar, a religious procession where the image of the Virgin Mary is carried take place in most coastal cities that have harbors, specially the large ones. The Brazilian city of Navegantes is named after Our Lady of Navigators.

The theme of the "Virgin Mary as the protector" was similarly used in The Virgin of the Navigators, painted sometime between 1531 and 1536 by Alejo Fernández. Depicting Mary and Spanish monarchs and explorers, this is the earliest known painting whose subject is the discovery of the Americas. It was painted as an altarpiece for, and remains at, a chapel of the Casa de Contratación in Alcázar of Seville, Seville, Spain.

== Gallery of churches ==
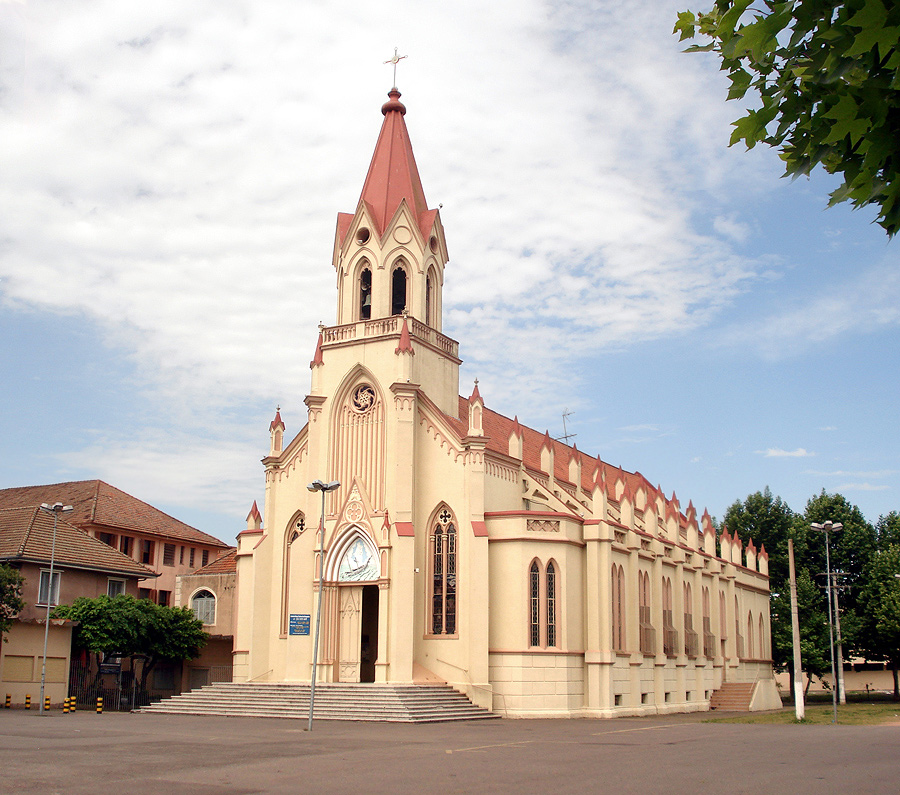
Porto Alegre, Brazil

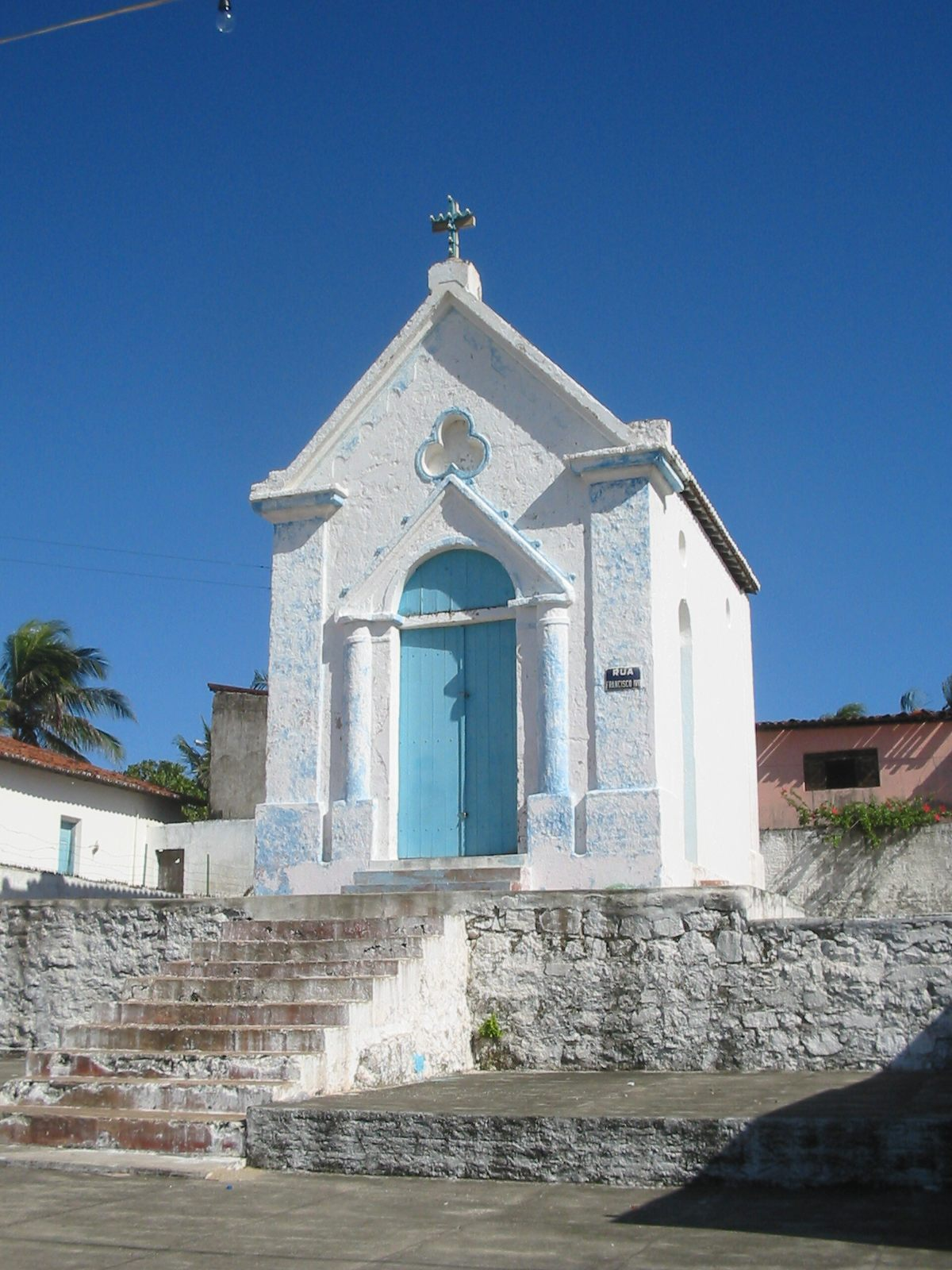
Redinha, Natal, Brazil

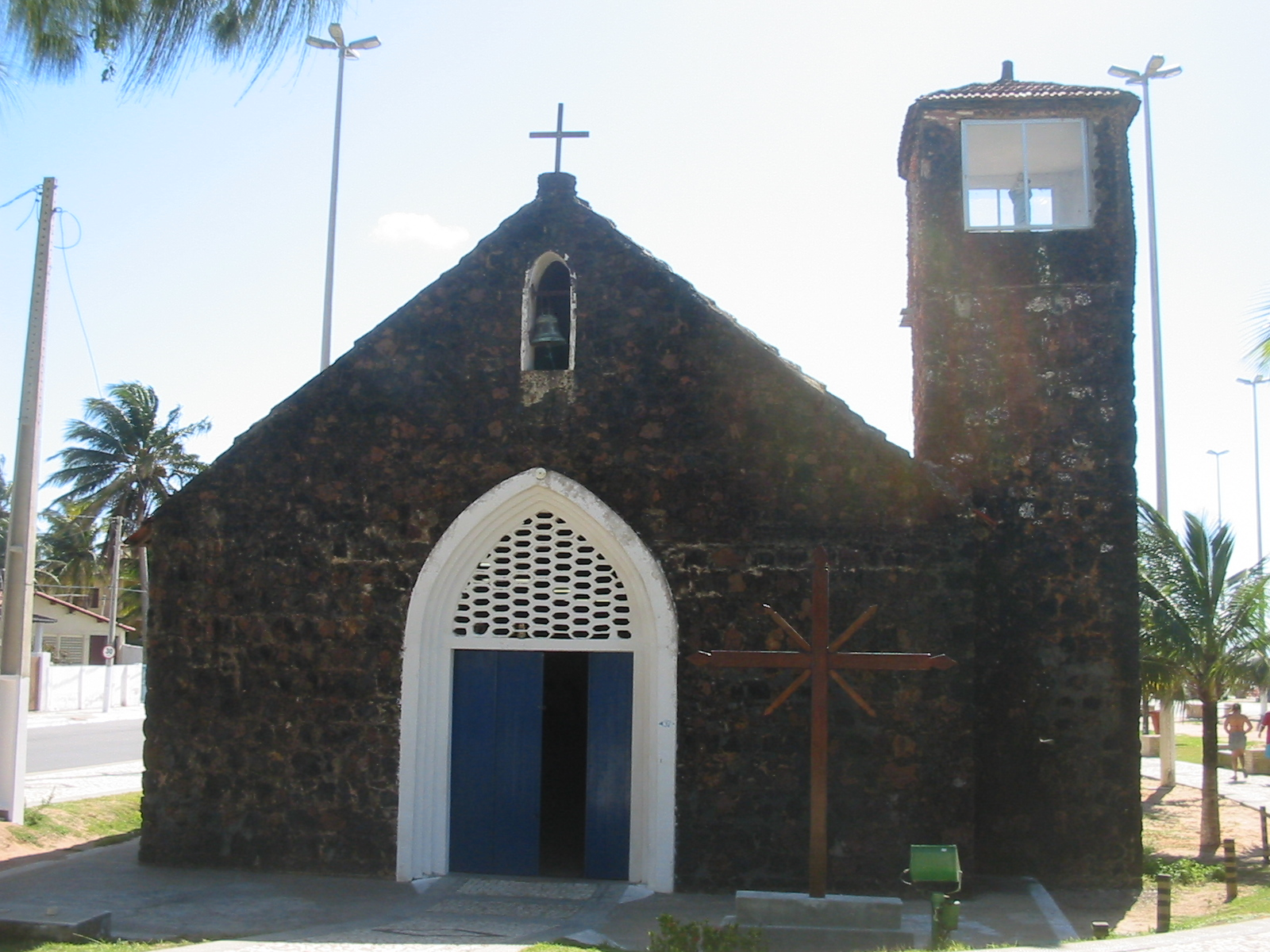
Redinha, Natal, Brazil

Igreja de Nossa Senhora dos Navegantes - Lisbon

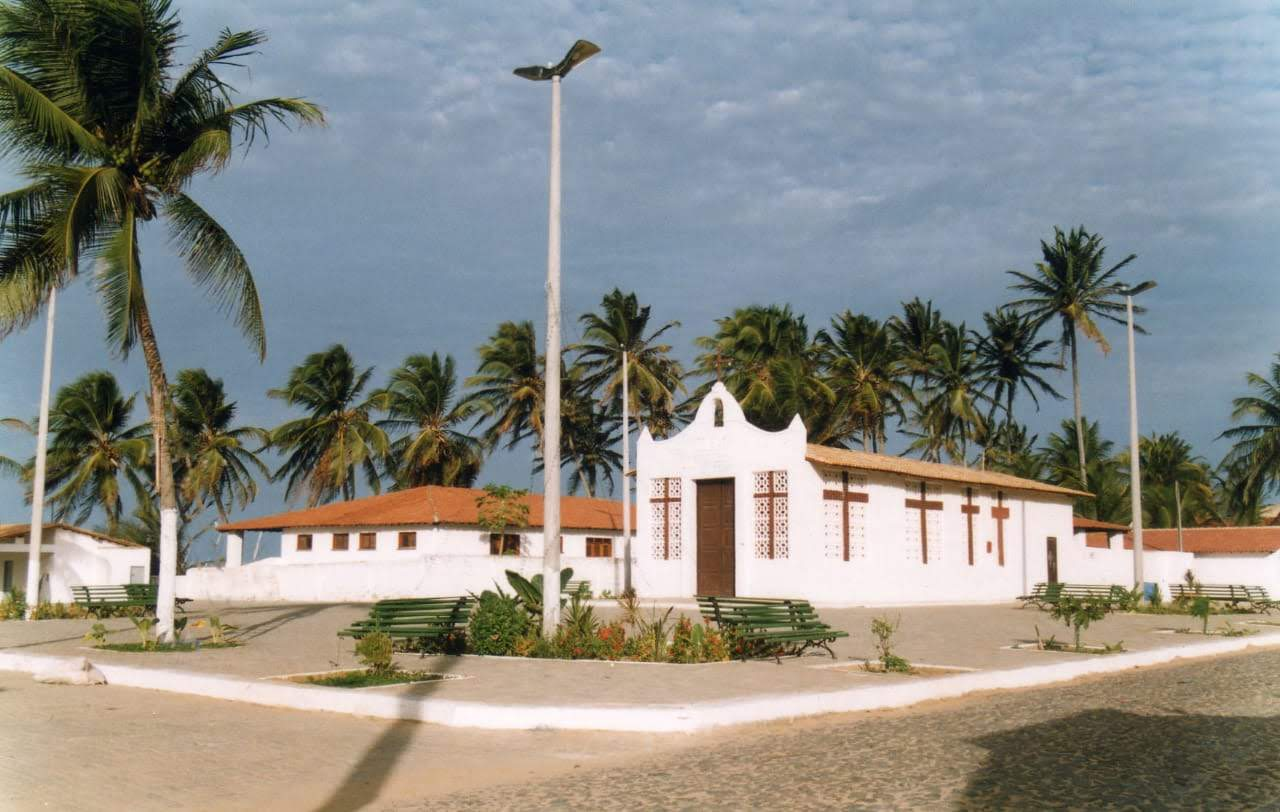
Guajiru, Brazil

== See also ==
- Virgin of Mercy
- Our Lady, Star of the Sea
- Ave Maris Stella
- Roman Catholic Marian art
- The Virgin of the Navigators
- Our Lady of Navigators church
- Festival of Our Lady of Navigators in Porto Alegre

== Sources ==
- Nossa Senhora dos Navegantes
