= Festival of Our Lady of Navigators in Porto Alegre =

Religious festival held in Porto Alegre, Brazil

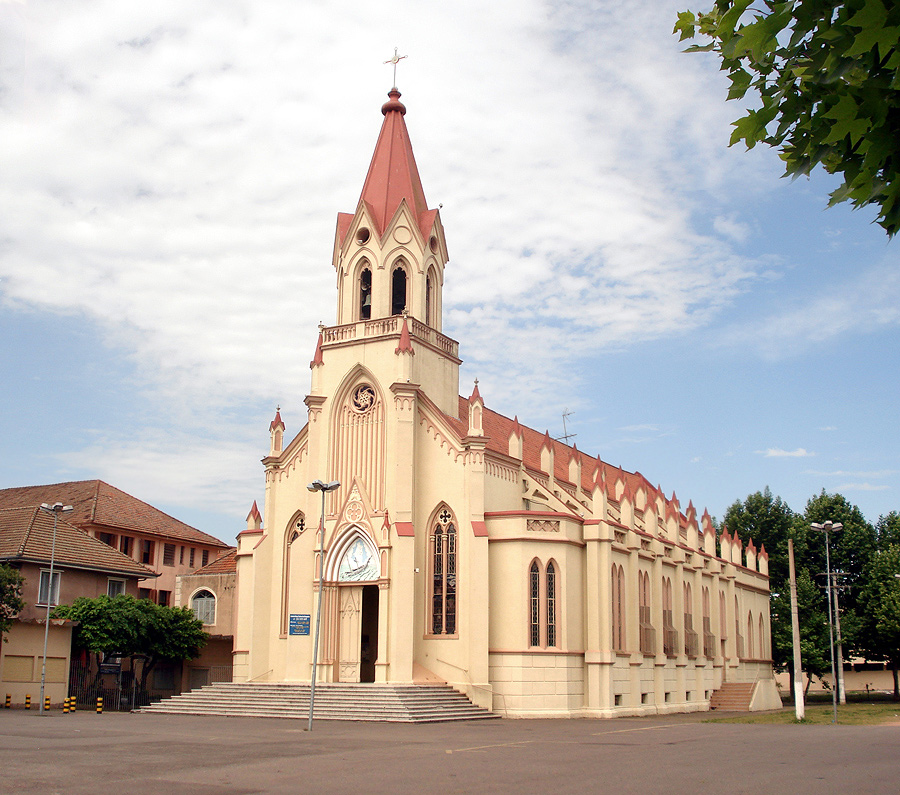
The Church of the Navigators.

The Festival of Our Lady of Navigators is a traditional religious festival in the Brazilian city of Porto Alegre, paying homage to Our Lady of the Navigators. The culmination of the festivities takes place on February 2nd of each year. It is one of the largest religious festivities in the south of Brazil, and an Intangible Heritage of the city. Originally a Catholic festival, over time it absorbed many devotees of Iemanjá, creating a syncretic symbolism.

== History ==
The first festival took place in 1871 when the image of Our Lady commissioned in Portugal arrived in the town. On that date, there was still no church for the saint, and the celebrations were held in the Chapel of the Child God, far from the town center. As the Portuguese community wanted the image to be exposed to the general population, they started the tradition of processions, taking the image to the Our Lady of the Rosary church, in the city center. In 1877, the Our Lady of Navigators church was inaugurated and became the permanent home of the image.

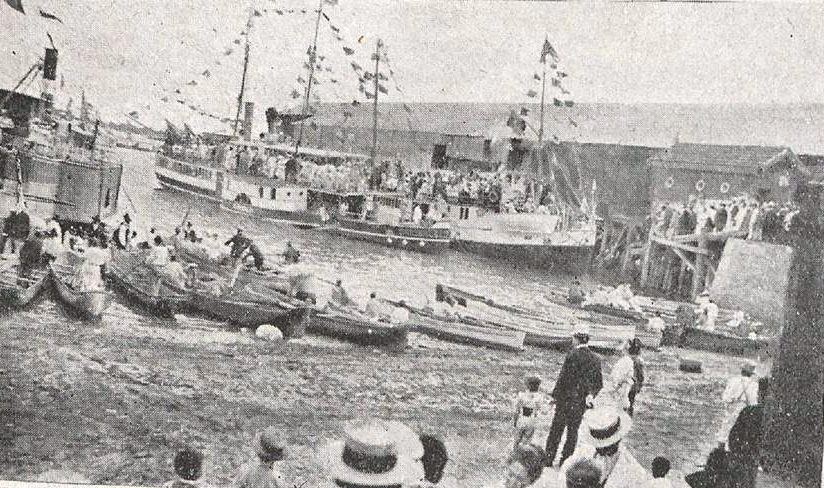
The river procession in 1918.

Traditionally, the festival takes place over several days, including masses, processions, fireworks, banquets, and other activities. In the square in front of the Church of the Navigators, a market is set up with stalls selling food, drinks, medals, saints, and other items. Since the 1920s, the consumption of watermelons, a fruit associated with Iemanjá, has become a traditional element of the festival.

The celebrations begin in mid-January with a procession to take the image to the Rosary church, where it remains on display until February 2nd. In the past, there used to be a large river procession on the 2nd, with boats crossing Lake Guaíba from the Mauá Wharf, taking the image back to its home. In the 1980s, the image was carried on a fire department boat that sprayed jets of colored water, followed by more than 200 decorated boats carrying people. As it passed under the Guaíba bridge, the boat was covered in a shower of flowers and shredded paper.

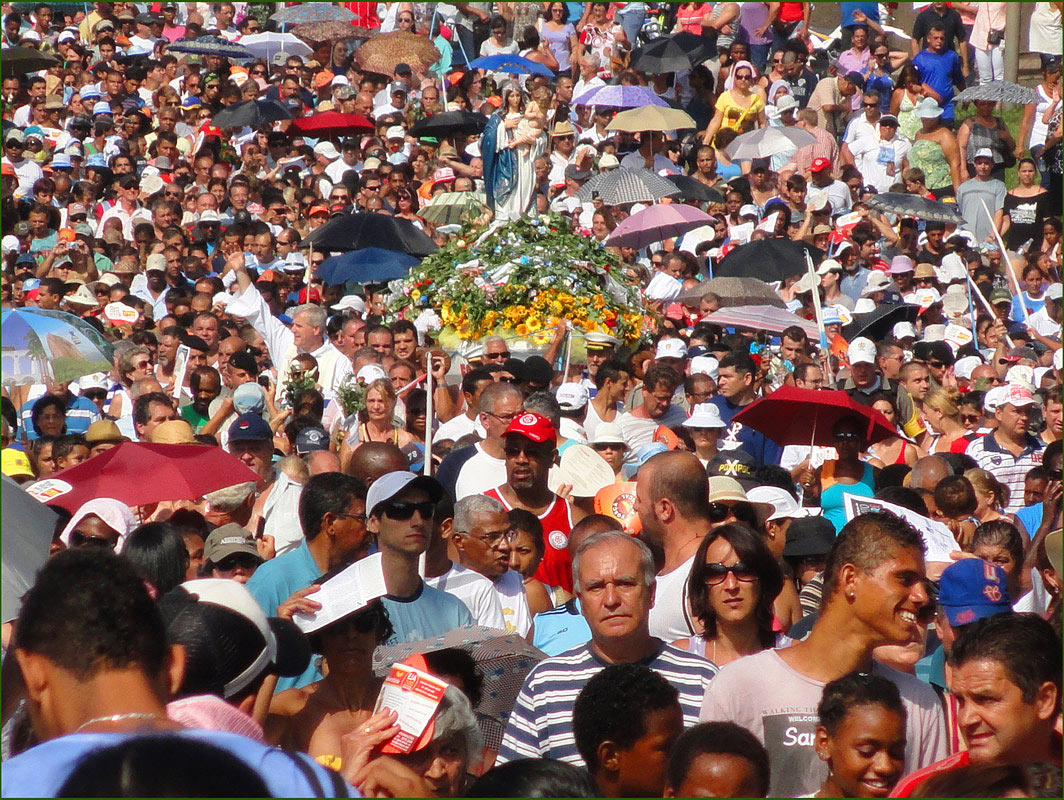
Land procession in 2007.

However, in 1989 the official river procession was discontinued by order of the Port Authority, due to safety concerns, and became a land procession. The measure was met with significant opposition. Despite the change, many boats from the Colônia Z5 Fishermen's Cooperative and nautical clubs continued to follow a parallel water route. In 2008, the parallel procession had around 130 boats, starting from Ilha da Pintada, passing by the Usina do Gasômetro, the Port of Porto Alegre, and ending at the Marinha do Brasil park.

In 2009, the image was once again taken by boat, on an experimental basis. In the same year, the book Festa de Nossa Senhora dos Navegantes em Porto Alegre: sincretismo entre Maria e Iemanjá, by Ari Pedro Oro and José Carlos Gomes dos Anjos, was published, in order to “record and publicize this important event in the history of Porto Alegre, a festival that brings together devotees of the Catholic and African religions.”

In 2010, the City Council declared the festival an Intangible Historical Heritage of Porto Alegre. According to Ângela Faria da Costa, “the Navigators festival is part of the history of Porto Alegre, of the traditions, culture and imagination of the people of Porto Alegre. It is therefore right that it should be registered as Intangible Historical Heritage of the Municipality." In 2013, the festival was included in the official calendar of events in Rio Grande do Sul. In 2022, the image of the saint was taken on the boat Cisne Branco to Ilha Grande dos Marinheiros, where it was received by the local population. According to the municipal secretary for Culture, Gunter Axt, “the saint's journey to the islands is a gesture of emulation of the deepest tradition of the celebration, linked to the fishermen and riverbank dwellers.” Because of the COVID-19 pandemic, the land procession was canceled.

== Present days ==
After the pandemic, the festivities were relaunched, where many of the participants walk barefoot, with white clothes, carrying candles, flowers, and rosaries. In 2024, the theme of the festival was “With the Mother of Navigators, walking in hope”.

== See also ==
- Our Lady of Navigators church (Porto Alegre)
- Our Lady of Navigators
