= Humaitá (disambiguation) =

Humaitá is a town in Paraguay.

It may also refer to:

== Places in Brazil ==
- Humaitá, Rio Grande do Sul, a town
- Humaitá, Rio de Janeiro, a residential district
- Humaitá, Porto Alegre, a district in the town of Porto Alegre
- Humaitá, Amazonas, a town
- Humaitã River

== Military ==
- Fortress of Humaitá, Paraguay, 1854–1868
- Humaitá-class gunboat, a type of vessel used in the Chaco War by the Paraguayan Navy
- Brazilian submarine Humaitá, several Brazilian submarines

== Other uses ==
- Humaitá Airport, serving Humaitá, Amazonas
- Humaita antbird, a species of bird

== See also ==
- Passage of Humaitá, an 1868 naval operation during the Paraguayan War
- Siege of Humaitá, a 1868 military operation during the Paraguayan War
