= Jacuí Delta =

Brazilian hydrographic complex

- Jacuí River Delta
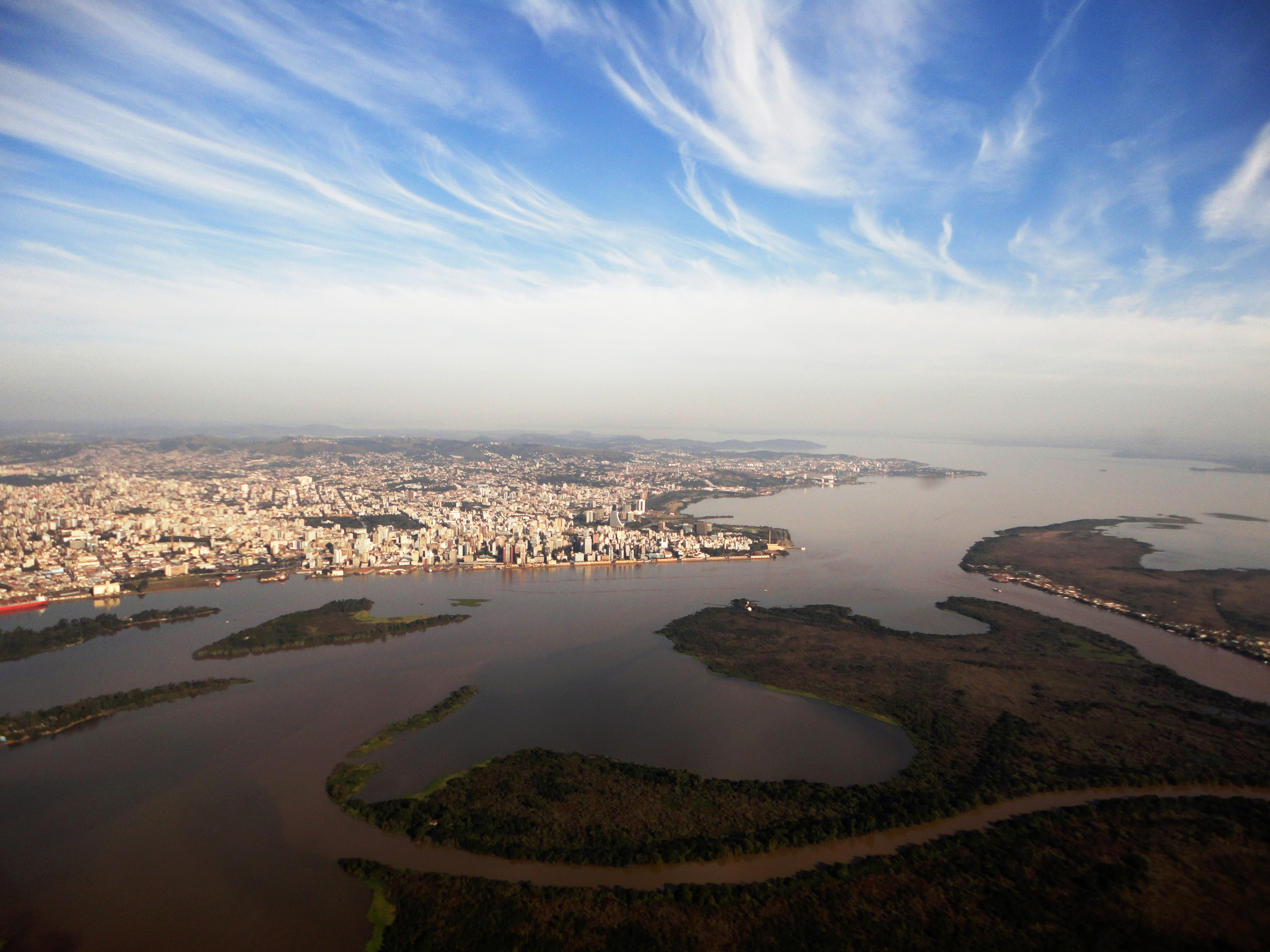
- Islands of the delta next to the center of Porto Alegre
- Location: Rio Grande do Sul; Brazil
- Coordinates: 29°58′16″S 51°14′55″W
- Islands: 16

Location
- Interactive map of Jacuí Delta

The Jacuí Delta (Portuguese: Delta do Jacuí) is a hydrographic complex of islands (archipelago), canals, swamps and ponds in Rio Grande do Sul, Brazil, formed by the meeting of the Jacuí, Caí, Sinos and Gravataí rivers, whose waters constitute Lake Guaíba.

Politically, the delta is a state environmental protection area that overlaps with a state conservation unit, the Jacuí Delta State Park. The Jacuí Delta Environmental Protection Area (APAEDJ) is located in the municipalities of Porto Alegre, Canoas, Nova Santa Rita, Triunfo, Charqueadas and Eldorado do Sul and totals 22,826.39 ha, while the park totals 14,242 hectares.

The Jacuí Delta State Park has the Jacuí Delta State Park Management Plan (PEDJ), published in 2014 and approved by SEMA Ordinance No. 20 of February 22, 2017.

The Jacuí Delta includes areas of the Pampas and Atlantic Forest biomes and plays an important role in regulating the water regime of the Jacuí and Guaíba rivers. According to the PEDJ: "The wetlands inside the park are part of a larger set of humid areas that, especially in the central area of Rio Grande do Sul, form a strip of marshes and floodplains in a westerly direction, reaching up to the Ibicuí River, next to the Uruguay River, and in the east, northeast and southeast directions form the system of marshes and lagoons of the coastal plain".

The eastern areas of the delta are urbanized. The urban centers of the municipalities of Triunfo, Eldorado do Sul and Charqueadas are located on the banks of the delta. Urban areas are also found in Porto Alegre, in the islands of Flores, Grande dos Marinheiros and Pintada. The Humaitá and Navegantes neighborhoods of the municipality of Porto Alegre were part of the deltaic system, but the implementation of the flood protection system in the 1970s (of which the Mauá Wall is part) eliminated their exposure to the deltaic water regime.

== Islands ==
The islands that the delta comprises are:

1. Balseiras Island
2. Cabeçuda Island
3. Chico Inglês Island
4. Flores Island
5. Formiga Island
6. Garças Island
7. Domingos José Lopes' Big Island
8. Grande dos Marinheiros Island
9. Humaitá Islands
10. Laje Island
11. Leopoldina Island
12. Lino Island
13. Lírio do Cravo Island
14. Mauá Island
15. Nova Island
16. Oliveira Island
17. Pavão Island
18. Pintada Island
19. Pinto Flores Island
20. Pólvora Island
21. Pombas Island
22. Ponta Rasa Island
23. Serafim Island
24. Siqueiras Island
25. Vírginia Island

=== Canals ===
Between the islands there are also a number of canals, many navigable. In the Navegantes Canal is the Mauá Pier and the Port of Porto Alegre. The waters of the Jacuí Delta also serve as a water supply for Porto Alegre's Water Treatment Plants.

== Protection area ==
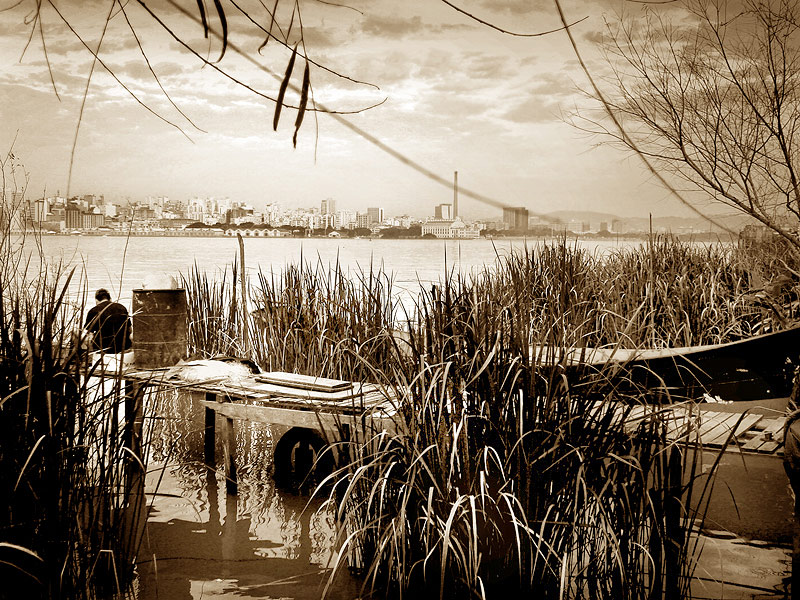
Pintada Island.

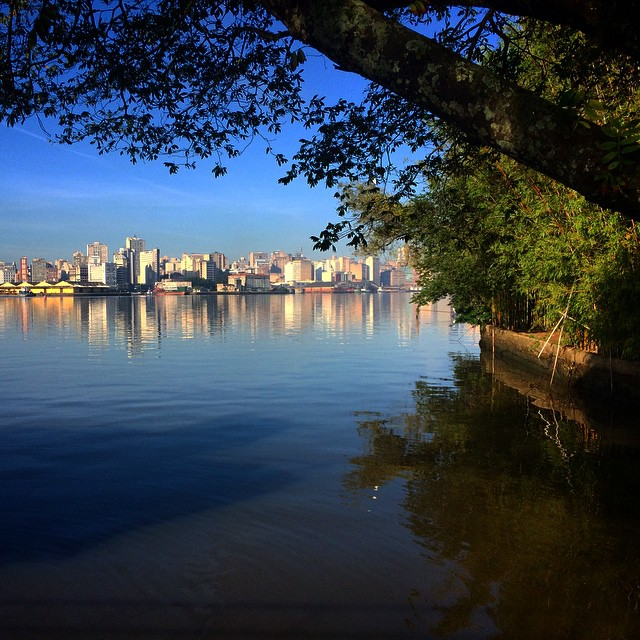
View of Porto Alegre from Pavão Island.

The delta has been protected through the creation of two environmental conservation units: the Jacuí Delta State Park (PEDJ) and the Jacuí Delta Environmental Protection Area (APAEDJ).

The Jacuí Delta State Park was created through Decree No. 24.385, of January 14, 1976. Since the park was not included in the categories of conservation unit provided for in the National System of Nature Conservation Units (SNUC), established in 2000, there was a need to create legislation to regulate it. State Decree No 43367 of September 28, 2004, corrected the situation.

=== Quality of the environment ===
The Jacuí Delta is polluted by sanitary sewage (mainly from the Gravataí River) and by industrial effluents (from the Caí and Sinos rivers) - coming from the historic leather and footwear manufacturing region near Novo Hamburgo and São Leopoldo.

About 85% of the area of the hydrographic region and of the waters reaching the Jacuí Delta are from the Jacuí River. Between 2000 and 2011, the Jacuí River was the main source of sediment to Lake Guaíba, but its annual sediment yield per area (20 Mg km^{−2} year^{-1)} was lower than that of other rivers like Sinos (44 Mg km^{−2} year^{−1}) and Caí (85 Mg km^{−2} year^{−1}).

== See also ==
- Arquipélago neighbourhood
- Ducks' Lagoon
