= Our Lady of Navigators church (Porto Alegre) =

Church of Our Lady of Navigators
- Igreja da Nossa Senhora dos Navegantes
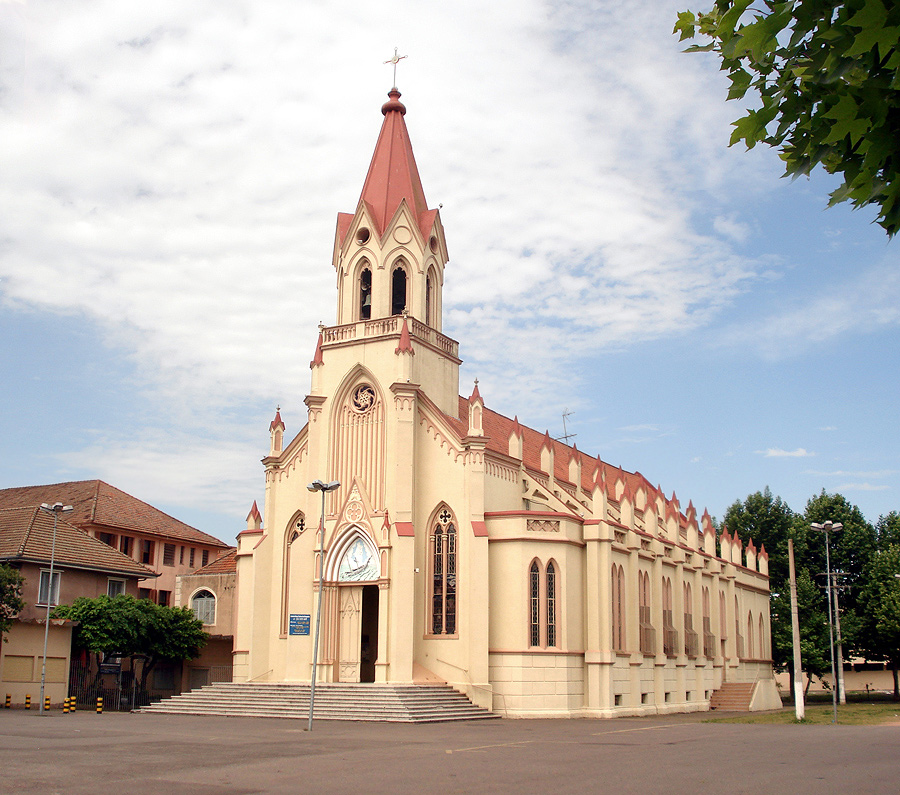
- Church of Our Lady of Navigators
- Location: Porto Alegre, Rio Grande do Sul
- Country: Brazil
- Denomination: Catholic

History
- Status: Parish church
- Founded: 1875
- Dedication: Our Lady of Navigators

Administration
- Metropolis: Porto Alegre

The Church of Our Lady of Navigators (Portuguese: Igreja da Nossa Senhora dos Navegantes) is a Roman Catholic Marian church located in the city of Porto Alegre, Brazil. It is one of the most popular Roman Catholic churches in the city and is the focus of one of the largest processions in the city each year on February 2. The current church was built in 1919 and is devoted to Our Lady of Navigators.

The devotion to Our Lady of Navigators started in Porto Alegre in 1869 by Bishop Sebastião Dias Laranjeira who commissioned the sculptor João Afonseca Lapa to build a statue of the Virgin Mary. The statue was first installed in 1871 in another church and was carried in processions.

In 1875 Margarida Teixeira de Paiva donated land for the construction of a church devoted to Our Lady of Navigators and city volunteers built the first church in wood. This first chapel was destroyed by fire, and in 1896 another was erected in the same place, but also caught fire in 1910. Community volunteers again built a new church which was completed in 1912 and formally inaugurated on 23 March 1913, with a new statue of the Blessed Virgin again made by João Afonseca Lapa similar to the one lost in the fire.

The building has been renovated and expanded over the years. It has a Gothic style, with one central tower and two aisles with a series of buttresses, pinnacles and small pillars highlighted abroad. Over the doorway is a bas-relief with the image of the Blessed Virgin Mary saving the shipwrecked.

== See also ==
- Festival of Our Lady of Navigators in Porto Alegre

== See also ==
- Roman Catholic Marian churches
- Church of Our Lady of the Conception
