= Alejo Fernández =

Spanish painter

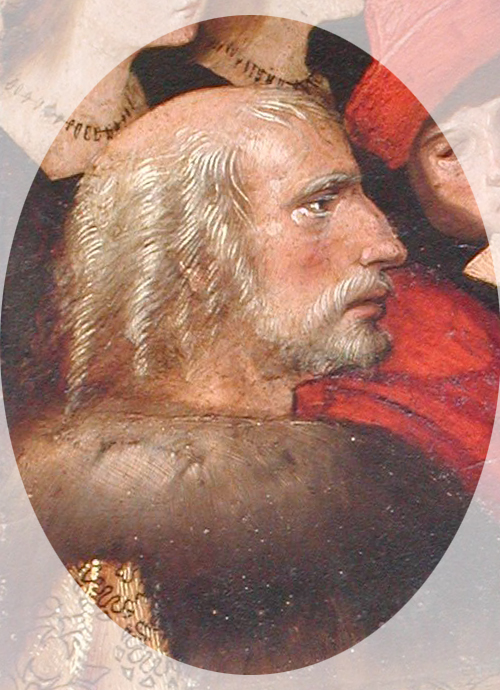
Christopher Columbus' portrait (detail of The Virgin of the Navigators), painted by Alejo Fernández between 1531 and 1536

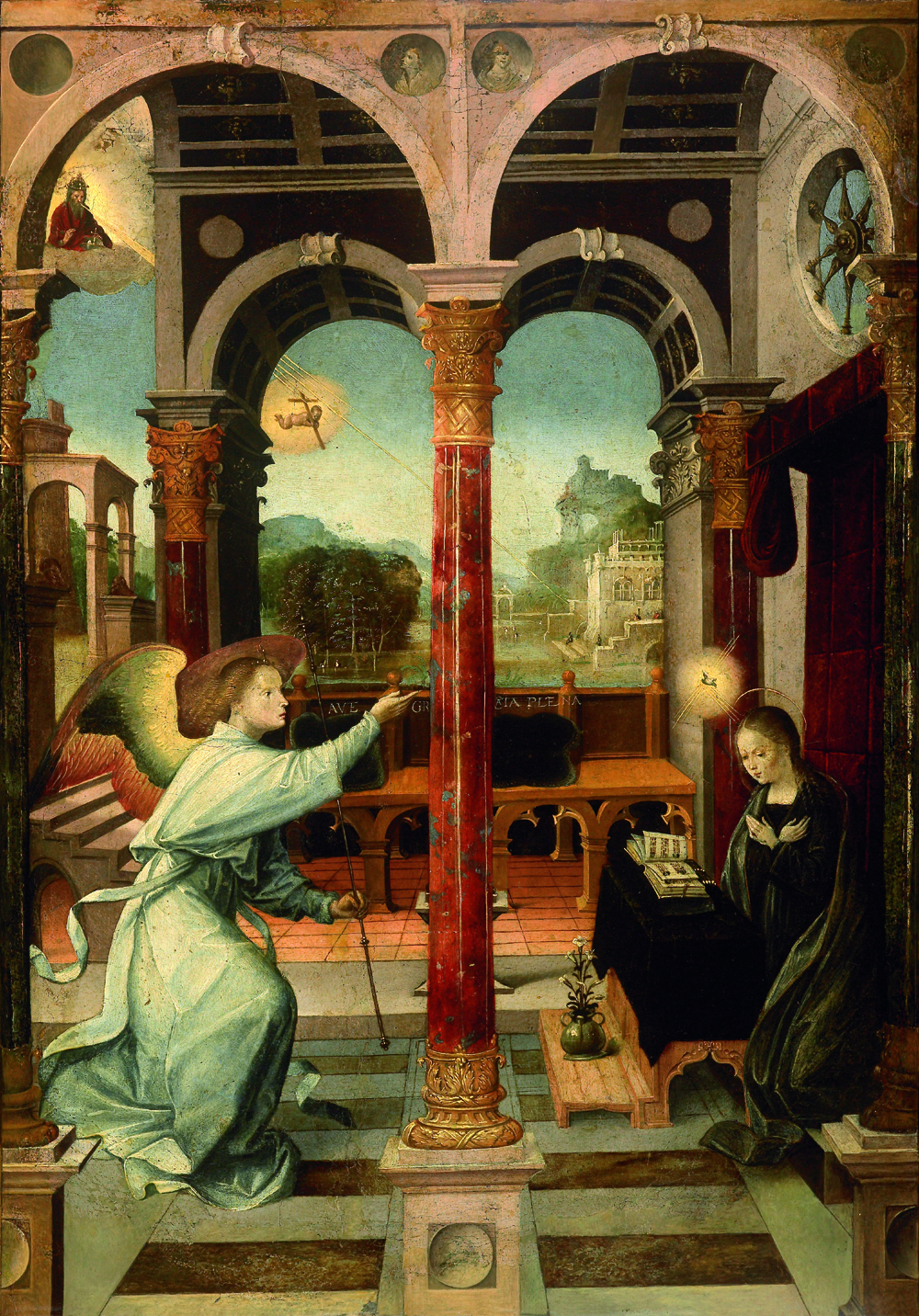
Annunciation.

Alejo Fernández (c. 1475 – c. 1545) was a Spanish painter best known for his portrait of Christopher Columbus painted between 1531 and 1536.

== Biography ==
He was born in Córdoba. Here, influenced by the style of the Flemish masters, he studied perspective and the structure of space. After moving to Seville in 1508, his interest moved to human representation. To the period in Córdoba belong the Christ at the Column in the city's Museum and the Triptych of the Last Supper in the Basilica of Our Lady of the Pillar in Zaragoza. Both are influenced by Bramante's style. In Fernández' later works, the figures are more majestic and more balanced with the presence of architectural elements. Later works include the Virgin of the Rose in the church of St. Anne in Seville, showing Italian influences such as Pinturicchio and Raphael, as well as Lombard masters, and The Virgin of the Navigators in the Alcázar of Seville.

He died in Seville around 1545.
