= Mauá Wharf =

Porto Alegre Port section

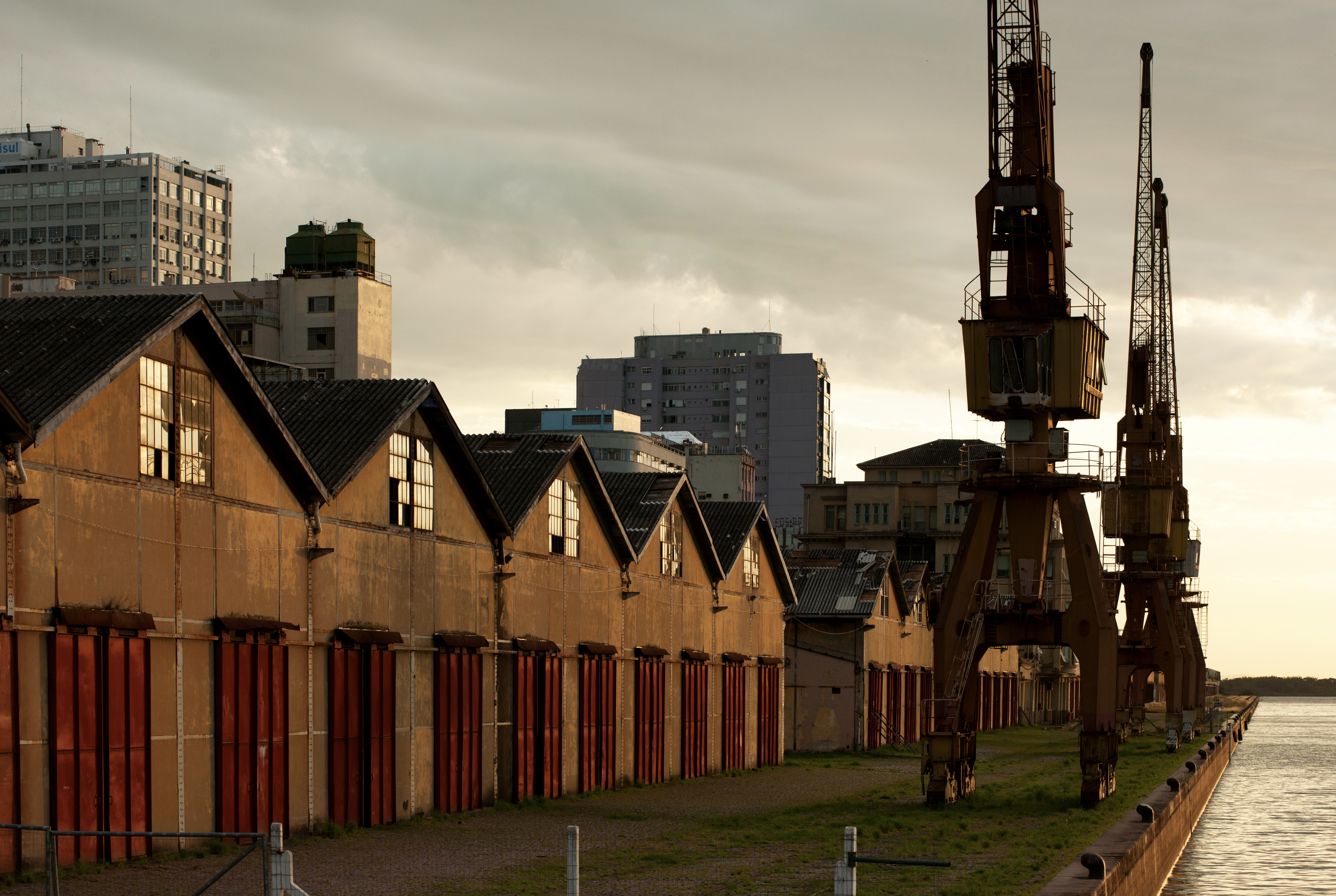

Location
- Location: Porto Alegre, Rio Grande do Sul; Brazil
- Coordinates: 30°01′39″S 51°13′55″W

Details
- Opened: 1921
- Closed: 2005

The Mauá Wharf (Portuguese: Cais Mauá) is a section of the river port located in the Brazilian city of Porto Alegre, in the state of Rio Grande do Sul. It is situated on the Navegantes Canal, upstream of Lake Guaíba, and is part of the Jacuí Delta.

== History ==
The construction of the Mauá Wharf was the outcome of a joint effort between the government and society in Rio Grande do Sul, which were striving to modernize Porto Alegre and boost the economy at the beginning of the 20th century. Its design was innovative in terms of hygiene, functionality and aesthetics.

The complex was built in stages. The first section, facing Alfândega Square, dates from 1911 to 1913. The central portico and warehouses A and B were built between 1919 and 1922. The other warehouses were completed between 1917 and 1927, and the DEPREC building only emerged in 1947.

The structure of warehouses A1, A2, A3, A4, A5, B1, B2 and B3 consists of iron riveted metal parts produced by the French company Daydé and assembled on site. It is filled with solid brick masonry. The clear span is approximately 20 meters and the length of each warehouse is around 90 meters. The storages, with pitched roofs, create a continuous architectural rhythm with a beautiful effect. With a single floor, its ceiling height is between seven and ten meters. DEPREC's headquarters is a six-storey building with an Eclectic and Art Deco styles whose structure is made of load-bearing masonry with concrete beams and floors, and the walls are covered in plaster.

In 1983, the central portico and warehouses A and B were registered by IPHAN. In 1996, the protection was reinforced by the municipal conservation of the rest of the complex, which included the cargo handling cranes along the wharf and the granite paving.

== Revitalization ==
For years, the Mauá Wharf complex has been at the center of a massive controversy regarding its revitalization project. In 2010, the protected area was granted to a private group to be improved, but the contract was terminated by the government after ten years without any progress being made. In 2021, the government of Rio Grande do Sul presented a new project to transform the old warehouses into a leisure, gastronomy and tourism area at a cost of R$1.3 billion, but it was heavily criticized by a large group of experts, students and professors from UFRGS, members of the Legislative Assembly and cultural activists, who defend a revitalization program focused on preserving its public and cultural function, and opposed to real estate and commercial speculation, elitism, gentrification and urban fragmentation.

== See also ==
- Port of Porto Alegre
- Jacuí Delta
