= The Virgin of the Navigators =

Painting by Alejo Fernández

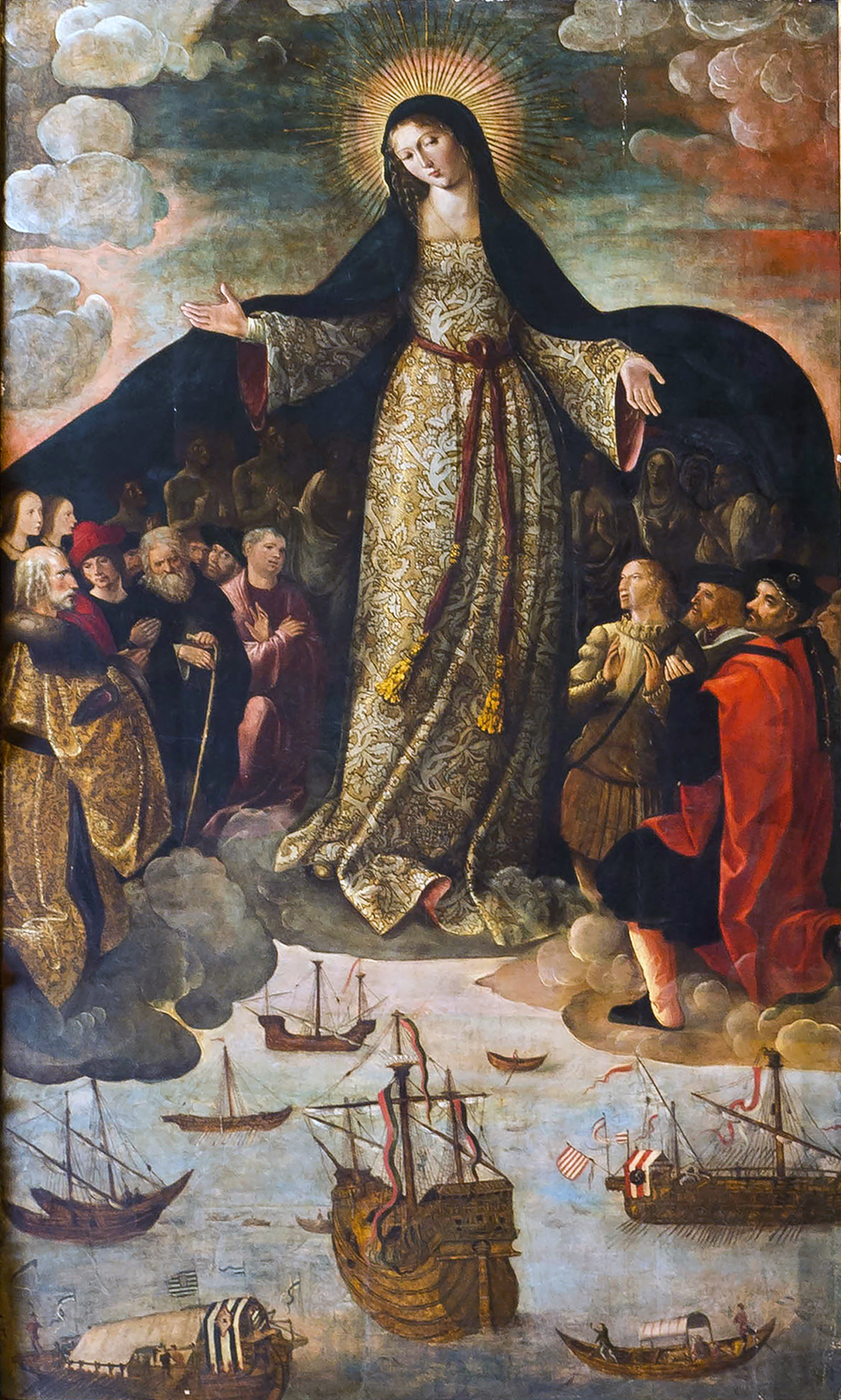
The Virgin of the Navigators, by Alejo Fernández, 1531–1536, oil on panel.

The Virgin of the Navigators (Spanish: La Virgen de los Navegantes) is a painting by Spanish artist Alejo Fernández, created as the central panel of an altarpiece for the chapel of the Casa de Contratación in Alcázar of Seville, Seville, southern Spain. Scholars date the painting to sometime between 1531 and 1536. Carla Rahn Phillips has suggested that it represents Christopher Columbus as a European magus-king reinforcing "the notion that the Spanish Empire represented the fulfillment of biblical prophecy to bring the Christian message to all the peoples of the world.

The painting is a version of the common iconography of the Virgin of Mercy, in which the Virgin Mary protects the faithful under the folds of her mantle. This was well known from many paintings such as the Madonna of Mercy by the Italian painter Piero della Francesca (1445). In this iconography, the Virgin Mary is always the largest figure in the picture, towering above those being protected.

Sometime before 1536, officials at the Casa de Contratación commissioned the painting as the central panel of an altarpiece that they installed in the Hall of Audiences, so that the room could also serve as a chapel.

== Background ==
By the Age of Exploration, Mariology had expanded in Europe and many Catholics perceived the Virgin Mary as the symbol of motherhood and of all that was good, gentle and merciful. These sentiments were expressed in Marian art from that period (see History of Mariology).

European navigators, especially the Portuguese, praying for a safe return to their homes, carried this sentiment to South America. They established churches dedicated to Our Lady of Navigators.

== Description ==
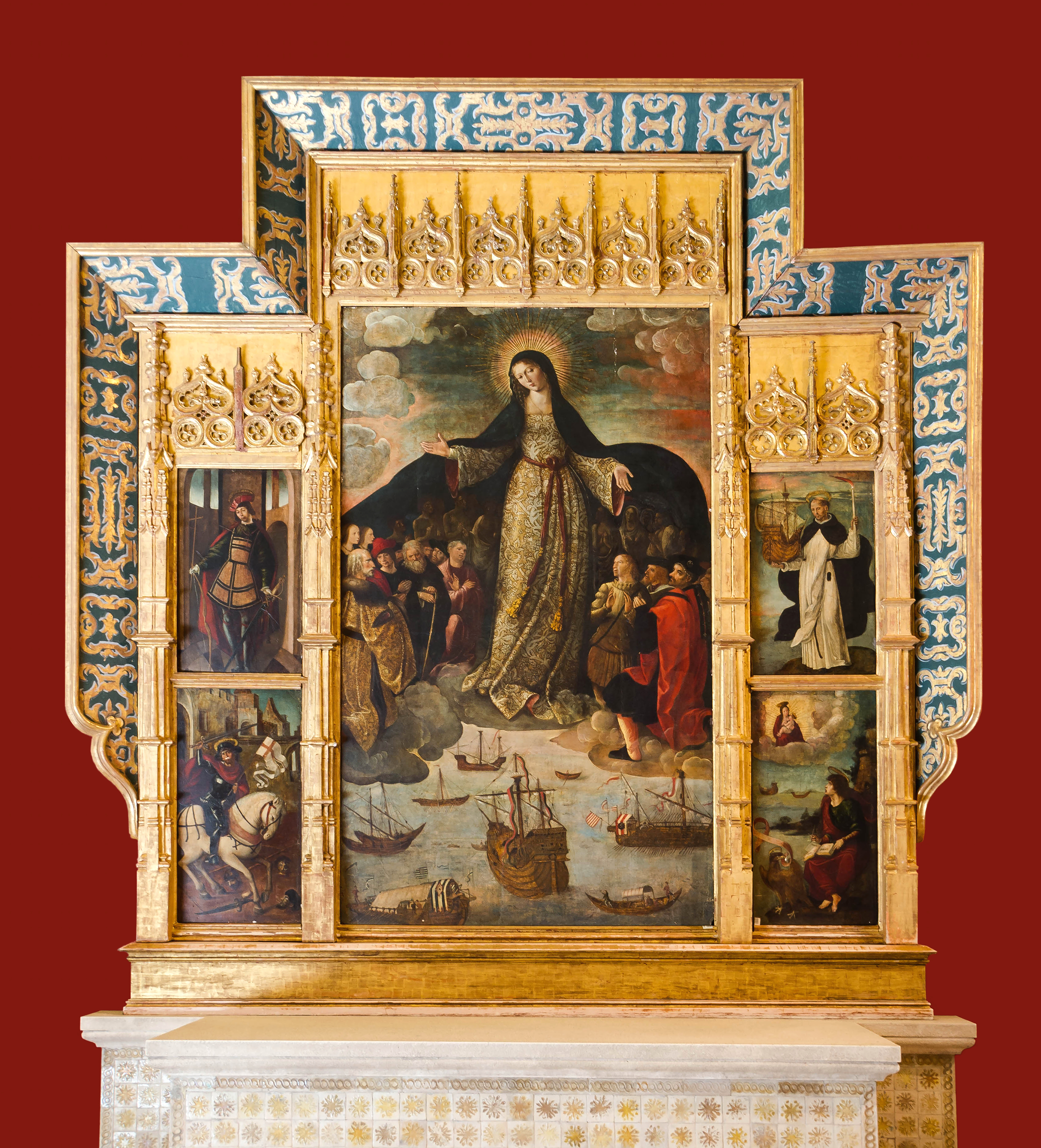
The entire altarpiece in the Alcázar of Seville

In The Virgin of the Navigators, Mary is depicted spreading her mantle over the Spanish. She straddles the seas, uniting the continents, or hovers over the harbor to protect ships, cargo and crew as they embark on the perilous Atlantic crossing.

Ferdinand II of Aragon and the emperor Charles V (cloaked in red), are portrayed together with Christopher Columbus, Amerigo Vespucci and one of the Pinzón Brothers, shown kneeling. All soar on clouds above the water beneath the Virgin's feet.

Behind the Europeans in the front row, the figures around the Virgin include indigenous peoples of the Americas, converted from their original faiths by the navigators who have set sail in her name: the painting "may be the fullest statement of the approved Spanish ideology, which might be called 'the White Legend of Spain's Imperial Election' ". These figures may have been modelled on the Black and Indigenous enslaved people in the artist's workshop.

Flanking the Virgin are panels depicting St. Sebastian, St. James the Great, St. Elmo, and St. John the Evangelist. These panels are thought to be the work of someone other than Alejo, perhaps a member of his workshop or another known artist.

== See also ==
- Alcázar of Seville
- Casa de Contratación
- Consecration and entrustment to Mary
- Sculptural depictions of Columbus
