= Brazilian submarine Humaitá =

Brazilian submarine Humaitá or Humaytá may refer to one of the following submarines of the Brazilian Navy:

- Brazilian submarine Humaytá (sometimes also spelled as Humaitá), an Italian Balilla-class submarine launched at La Spezia in 1927; completed and commissioned into the Brazilian Navy in 1929; decommissioned in 1950.
- Brazilian submarine Humaitá (S14), the former American Gato-class submarine USS Muskallunge (SS-262) launched at Groton, Connecticut, in 1942; acquired by the Brazilian Navy in 1957; returned to the United States Navy in 1968 and subsequently sunk as a target.
- Brazilian submarine Humaitá (S20), a British Oberon-class submarine ordered from Vickers in 1970 and launched at Barrow in 1971; commissioned into the Brazilian Navy in 1973; decommissioned in 1996.
- Brazilian submarine Humaitá (S41), a Scorpène-class submarine commissioned in 2024.
