= Redinha beach =

Beach in Natal, Rio Grande do Norte, Brazil

Redinha beach (Portuguese: Praia da Redinha)
- Beach
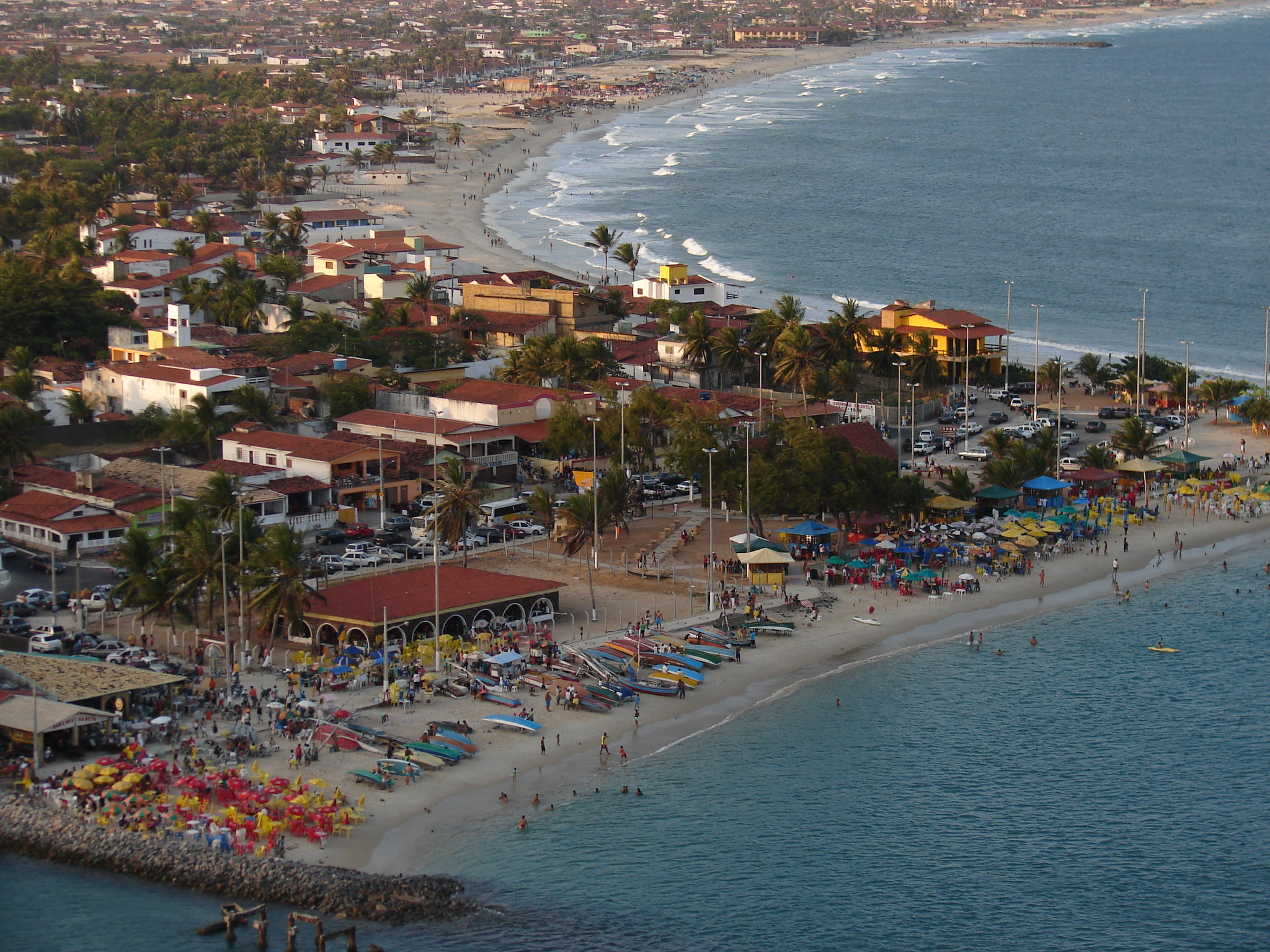
- Coordinates: 5°44′42″S 35°12′12″W
- Native name: (Portuguese: Praia da Redinha)

Redinha beach (Portuguese: Praia da Redinha) is a beach located in the Brazilian city of Natal in the State of Rio Grande do Norte.
