= Alcázar of Seville =

Royal palace in Seville, Spain

- Real Alcázar de Sevilla (Spanish)
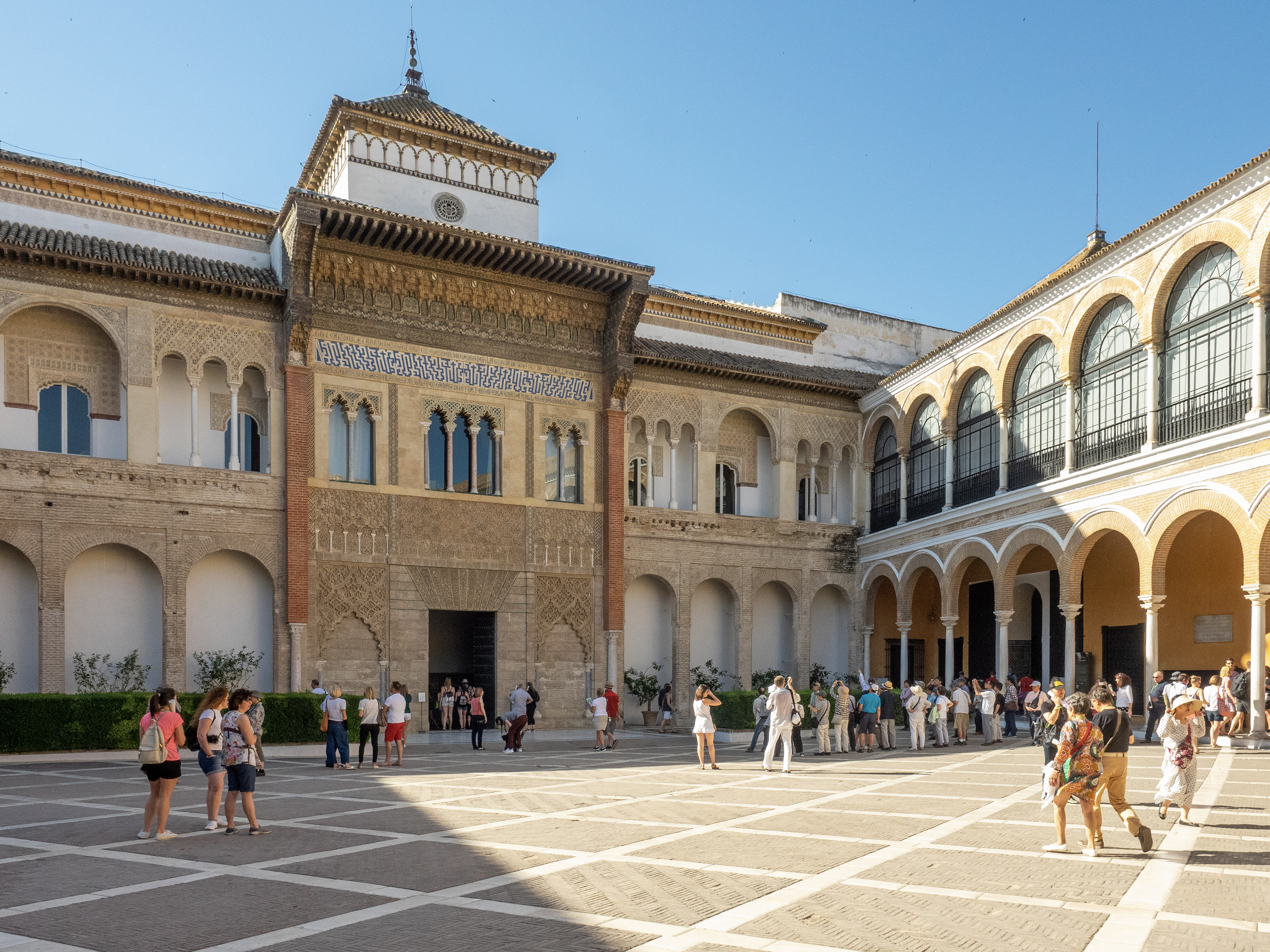
- Patio de la Montería courtyard

- Location within Spain
- 37°23′02″N 5°59′29″W
- Type: Alcázar
- Location: Seville, Spain

UNESCO World Heritage Site
- Type: Cultural
- Criteria: i, ii, iii, vi
- Designated: 1987 (11th session)
- Part of: Cathedral, Alcázar and General Archive of the Indies in Seville
- Reference no.: 383-002
- Region: Europe and North America

Spanish Cultural Heritage
- Type: Non-movable
- Criteria: Monument
- Designated: 3 June 1931
- Reference no.: RI-51-0001067

The Alcázar of Seville, officially called Royal Alcázar of Seville (Spanish: Real Alcázar de Sevilla or Reales Alcázares de Sevilla), is a historic royal palace in Seville, Spain and one of the official residences of the Spanish royal family. It was formerly the site of the Islamic-era citadel of the city, begun in the 10th century under the Umayyads and then developed into a larger palace complex by the Abbadid dynasty (11th century) and the Almohads (12th to early 13th centuries). After the Castilian conquest of the city in 1248, the site was progressively rebuilt and replaced by new palaces and gardens. Among the most important of these is a richly decorated Mudéjar-style palace built by Pedro I during the 1360s.

The palace is a preeminent example of Mudéjar style in the Iberian Peninsula and also includes sections with Gothic and Renaissance elements. The upper storeys of the Alcázar are still occupied by the royal family when they visit Seville and are administered by the Patrimonio Nacional. It was registered in 1987 by UNESCO as a World Heritage Site, along with the adjoining Seville Cathedral and the General Archive of the Indies.

== Etymology ==
The Spanish term Alcázar (pronounced [alˈkaθaɾ]) comes from Arabic: اَلْقَصْر, romanized: al-qaṣr (اَلْقَصْر, "a large stone building from which power is projected"), which is ultimately from Latin castrum "fort".

== History ==
=== Islamic era ===
In the year 712, Seville was conquered by the Umayyad Caliphate. In the year 913–914, after a revolt against the government of Córdoba, the first emir of Córdoba, Abd al-Rahman III, built a fortified construction in place of a Visigothic Christian basilica. It was a quadrangular, roughly square enclosure about 100 metres (330 ft) long on each side, fortified with walls and rectangular towers, and annexed to the city walls.

In the 11th century, during the Taifa, the Abbadid ruler al-Mu'tamid expanded the complex southwards and eastwards, with a new southern enclosure measuring approximately 70 by 80 metres (230 by 260 ft). This new palace was called al-Mubarak "the Blessed" (المبارك). Various additions to the construction such as stables and warehouses were also carried out.

Towards 1150, the Almohad Caliphate began to develop Seville as their capital in al-Andalus. The Almohad governor extended the fortified complex to the west, nearly doubling its size. At least six new courtyard palaces were constructed in the old enclosures, and nine palaces were added in the western extensions. In 1163 the caliph Abu Yaʿqub Yusuf made the Alcazar his main residence in the region. He further expanded and embellished the palace complex in 1169, adding six new enclosures to the north, south, and west sides of the existing palaces. The works were carried out by architects Ahmad Ben Baso and Ali al-Ghumari. With the exception of the walls, nearly all previous buildings were demolished, and a total of approximately twelve palaces were built. Among the new structures was a very large garden courtyard, now known as the Patio del Crucero, which stood in the old Abbadid enclosure. Between 1171 and 1198, an enormous new congregational mosque was built on the north side of the Alcazar (later transformed into the current Cathedral of Seville). A shipyard was also built nearby in 1184, and a textile market was established in 1196.

There are few remnants of these Islamic-era constructions today. Archaeological remains of the Al Mubarak Palace are currently preserved under the Patio de la Monteria. Several wall painting fragments were found that are now exhibited in the Palacio del Yeso. The courtyard buildings now known as the Palacio del Yeso (or Patio del Yeso), the Palacio de la Contratación, and the Patio del Crucero all preserve remains from the Almohad period.

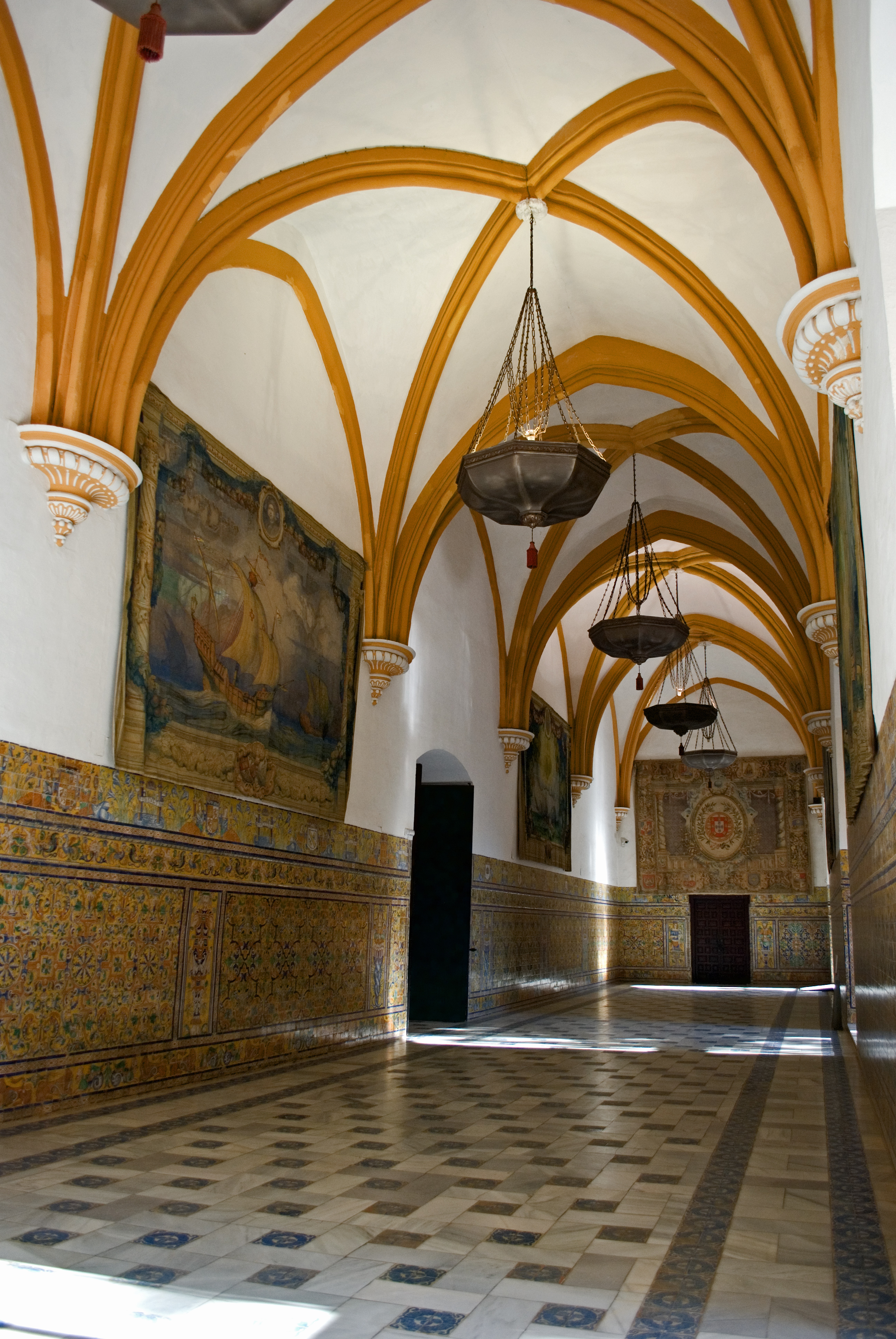
The Sala de las Bóvedas preserves elements of Alfonso X's Gothic palace (13th century).

=== Christian era ===
Seville was conquered in 1248 by Ferdinand III of Castile. The former Moorish palace-citadel was taken over by the Castilian monarchs and underwent significant reconstruction and modification, such that most of the Islamic-era structure has since disappeared.

A Gothic-style palace was built on the site in 1258 for Alfonso X (Ferdinand's successor). It stood on the site of the present-day Patio del Crucero, incorporating and preserving parts of the Almohad-era courtyard that was found here, including the Islamic-style garden divided into quadrants by two intersecting paths. Over these paths and around the courtyard, Gothic-style vaults and pointed arches were added, along with a hall divided into several naves. Corners towers containing spiral staircases granted access to an upper terrace. Of the Gothic palace today, only the upstairs Sala de las Bóvedas and the Baños de María de Padilla, with their Gothic cross-ribbed vaults, have been preserved or partially preserved.

In the mid-14th century, Alfonso XI commissioned the construction of a new throne hall known as the Hall of Justice, which commemorated his victory at the Battle of Río Salado (1340). It is attached to the Patio del Yeso, an Almohad-era courtyard, and also serves as its antechamber. This new addition was made in a Mudéjar style, with stucco decoration and an overall arrangement of elements directly based on contemporary Islamic Andalusi architecture.

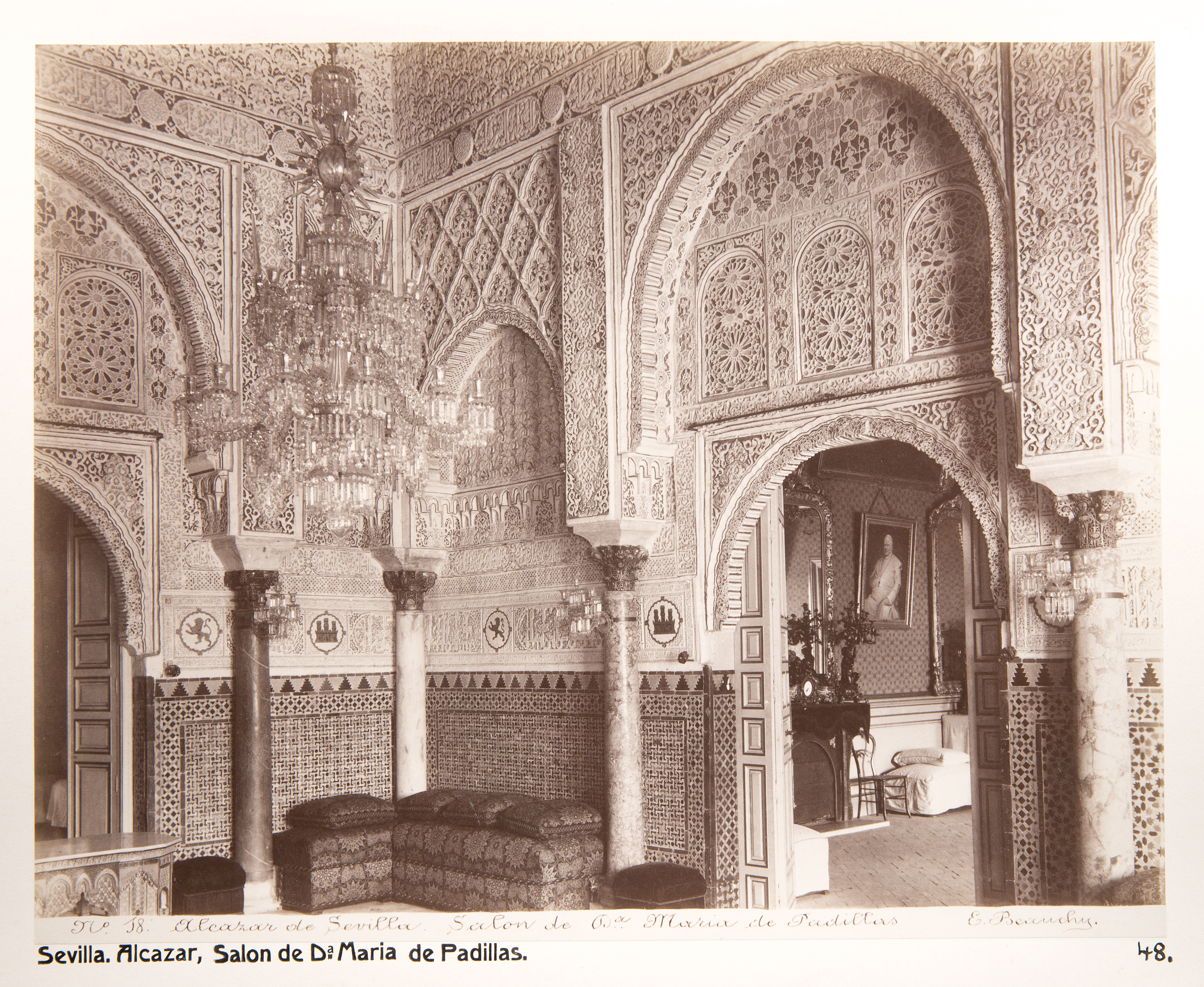
1895 photo of a Mudéjar room in the palace

In the 1360s, much of the complex was rebuilt by Pedro I in an ornate Mudéjar style. The palace includes a monumental façade, a courtyard (the present-day Patio de las Doncellas), and a great domed hall known as the Hall of the Ambassadors (Salon de los Embajadores). A Latin inscription on the palace façade includes the year 1364 while an Arabic inscription in the Hall of Ambassadors gives the year 1366, which indicate the probable dates for the start and completion of construction, respectively. The architecture of Pedro I's palace has strong similarities to the contemporary Nasrid palaces of the Alhambra in Granada, although the complicated chronology of construction and renovations at both sites makes it difficult to determine what roles they might have played in influencing each other's designs. It is likely that Muhammad V, the Nasrid ruler of Granada and Pedro I's ally, sent craftsmen to Seville to help assist in the palace's construction and decoration. Under the Catholic Monarchs, Isabella (d. 1504) and Fernando (d. 1516), the upper floor of the palace was extended and transformed into their main residence.

The palace was the birthplace of Infanta Maria Antonietta of Spain (1729–1785), daughter of Philip V of Spain and Elisabeth Farnese, when the king was in the city to oversee the signing of the Treaty of Seville (1729) which ended the Anglo-Spanish War (1727). Much of the old Gothic Palace of Alfonso X was destroyed during the 1755 Lisbon earthquake.

== The palace ==
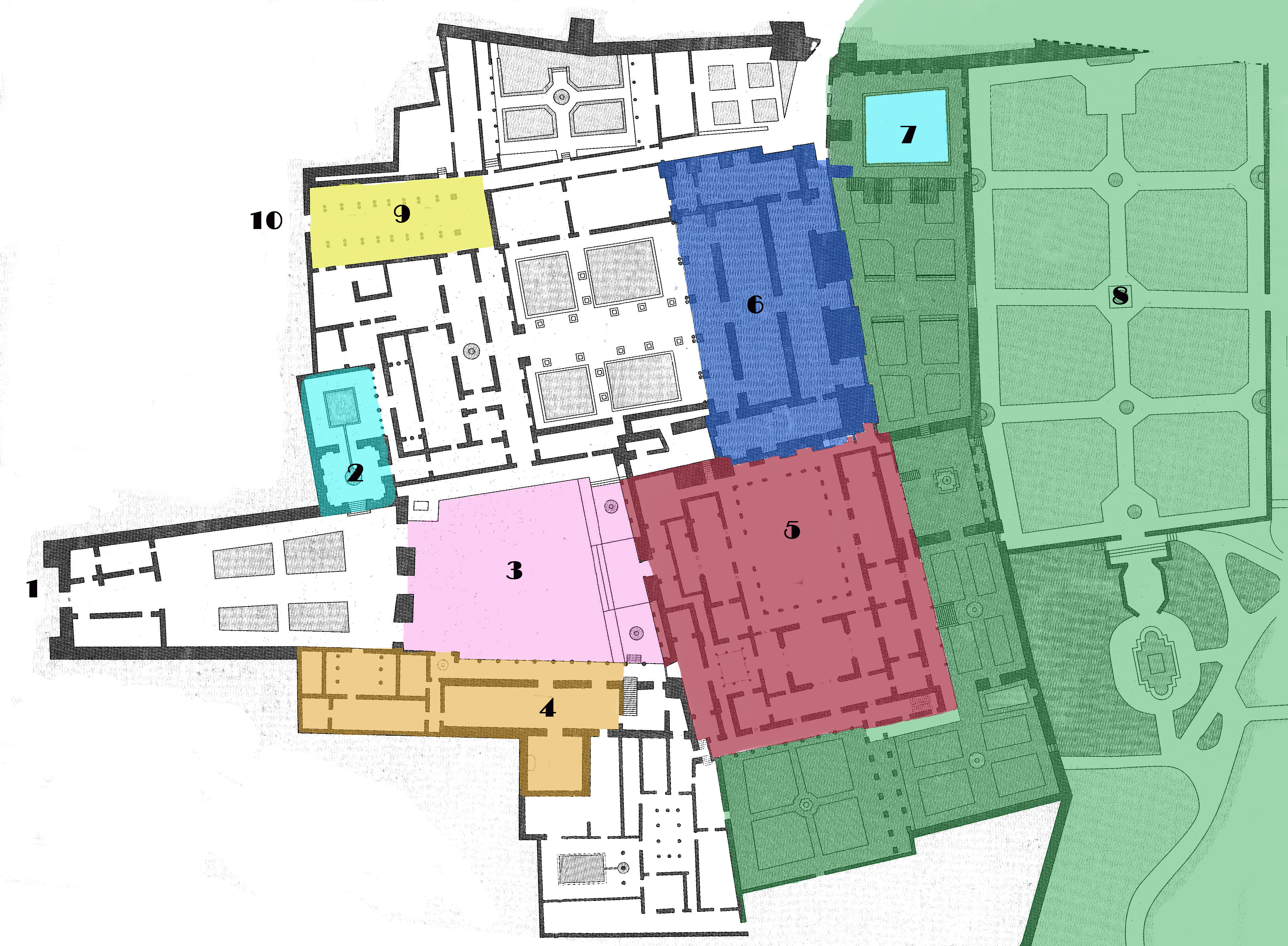
Plan of the Alcázar of Seville: 1-Puerta del León; 2-Sala de la Justicia y patio del Yeso (cyan); 3-Patio de la Montería (pink); 4-Cuarto del Almirante y Casa de Contratación (cream); 5-Palacio mudéjar o de Pedro I (red); 6-Palacio gótico (blue); 7-Estanque de Mercurio; 8-Jardines (green); 9-Apeadero (yellow); 10-Patio de Banderas

The Real Alcázar is situated near the Seville Cathedral and the General Archive of the Indies in one of Andalusia's most emblematic areas.

=== Tiles ===
The palace is renowned for its ornate tile decoration, with tiles being either arista or majolica. In the arista technique, each tile is created by pressing clay into a mould—a process which creates tiles that have raised ridges and a three dimensional effect. By contrast, majolica tiles are flat and are created by painting design and color directly onto an opaque white background glaze. This technique was developed later than the arista process, during the 15th–16th centuries. As an important trade center, Seville had easy access to a wealth of producers of tiles which were mainly of geometric design inspired by arabesque ornamentation.

In the 16th century, the Catholic Monarchs commissioned an Italian artist from Pisa, Francisco Niculoso (called Pisano) to make two majolica tile altarpieces for their private chapel in the palace. One still exists in the oratory of the royal apartments, the other one is missing. Later, the artist Cristóbal de Augusta created a tile-work in the Palacio Gotico. It features animals, cherubs and floral designs and gives the palace a bright tapestry look.

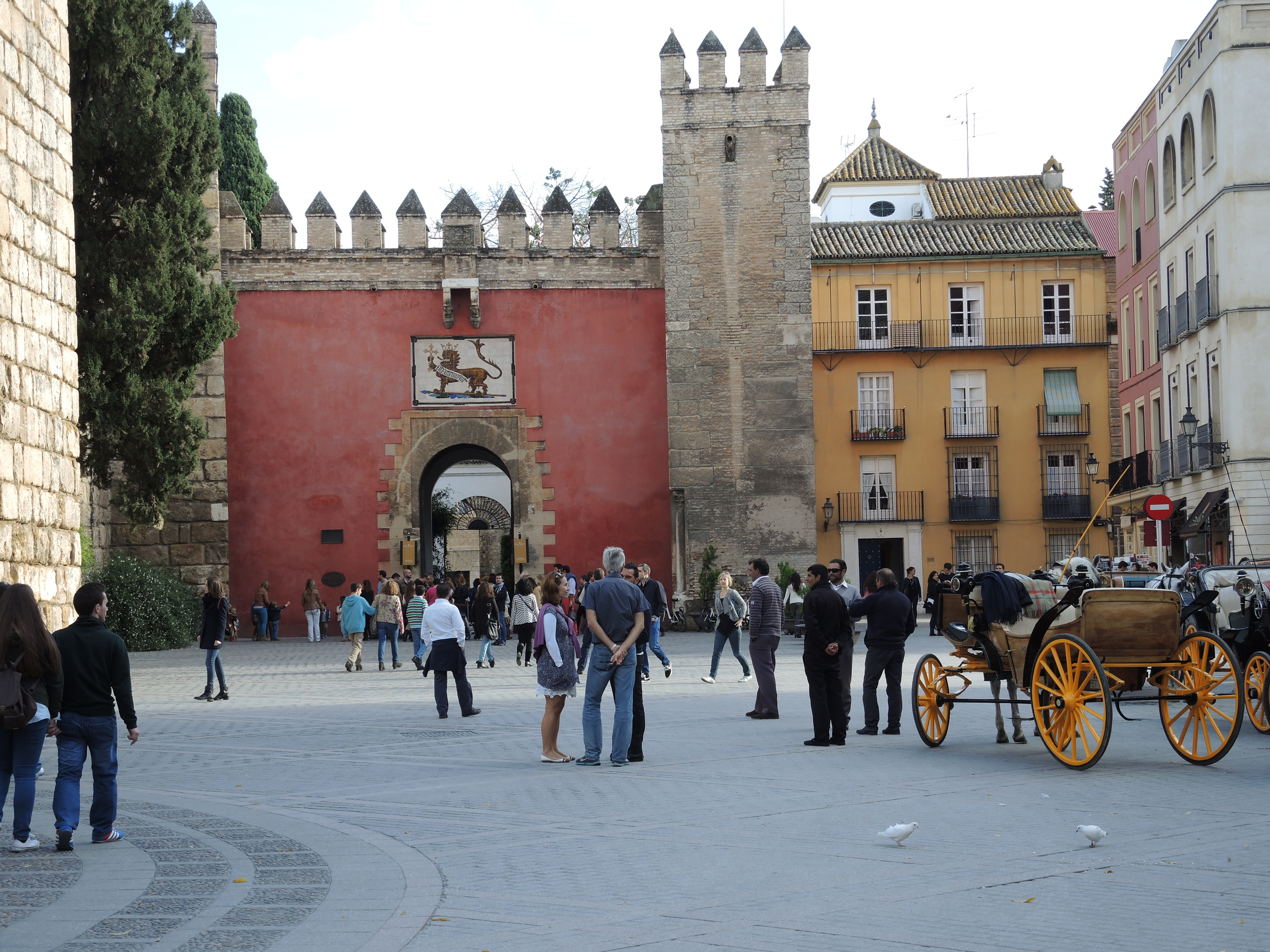
Puerta del León (Gate of the Lion).

=== Puerta del León ===
The Puerta del León (Gate of the Lion), located in the outer wall of the complex, is the main access to the enclosure. Between the lintel of this gate and under a machicolation there was a painting of a lion, whose origin is unknown, although it appears in the drawings made by Richard Ford in 1832. The painting was likely painted over in 1876 when Joaquín Domínguez Bécquer, the director of the painting and gilding at the time, may have considered it to be in bad condition and beyond repair.

In 1892 the painting was replaced by a panel of azulejo designed by Manuel Tortosa y Fernández, with the historical advice of José Gestoso. The azulejo was made in the Mensaque factory and also represents a lion, in Gothic style, which appears holding a crucifix with its right claw and with a flag under its left claw. On the chest there is a tefillin reading in Latin Ad utrumque, which means "for one thing and for another", the word 'paratus' would be missing; Ad utrumque paratus, thus meaning "prepared for one thing and for another".

The name "Puerta del León" dates to the 19th century and derives from the heraldic lion in this panel of tilework which is above the gateway and under a defensive machicolation. Historically, this gate had been known as Puerta de la Montería (Gate of the Hunt). According to Ortiz de Zúñiga (17th century) it was named this way as it was the gate used by King Peter and his men when they went hunting. The fact that Peter's father, Alfonso XI of Castile, was an avid hunter who even wrote a book on hunting lends credence to this hypothesis. According to José Gestoso, the gate's name derives from the hunting-themed decoration that is found here. On the left side of the arch there are reliefs of two worn poly-lobed medallions. One of them depicts what appears to be a four-legged animal. After passing through the gate, one enters the Patio del León. At the back of the courtyard, facing the entrance, is a stretch of Almohad defensive wall pierced by three arches. This wall has a masonry facade behind which is found unfaced rubble. The two outer arches were originally horseshoe-shaped arches which were transformed into rounded arches during the Christian period. Theatrical plays from the Spanish Golden Age were performed in a theatre, the Corral de Montería (Enclosure of the Hunt), that once stood here. It was established in 1625 and destroyed by a fire on 3 May 1691. Behind the stretch of wall is the Patio de la Montería, which faces the Palacio del Rey Don Pedro.

=== Sala de Justicia ===
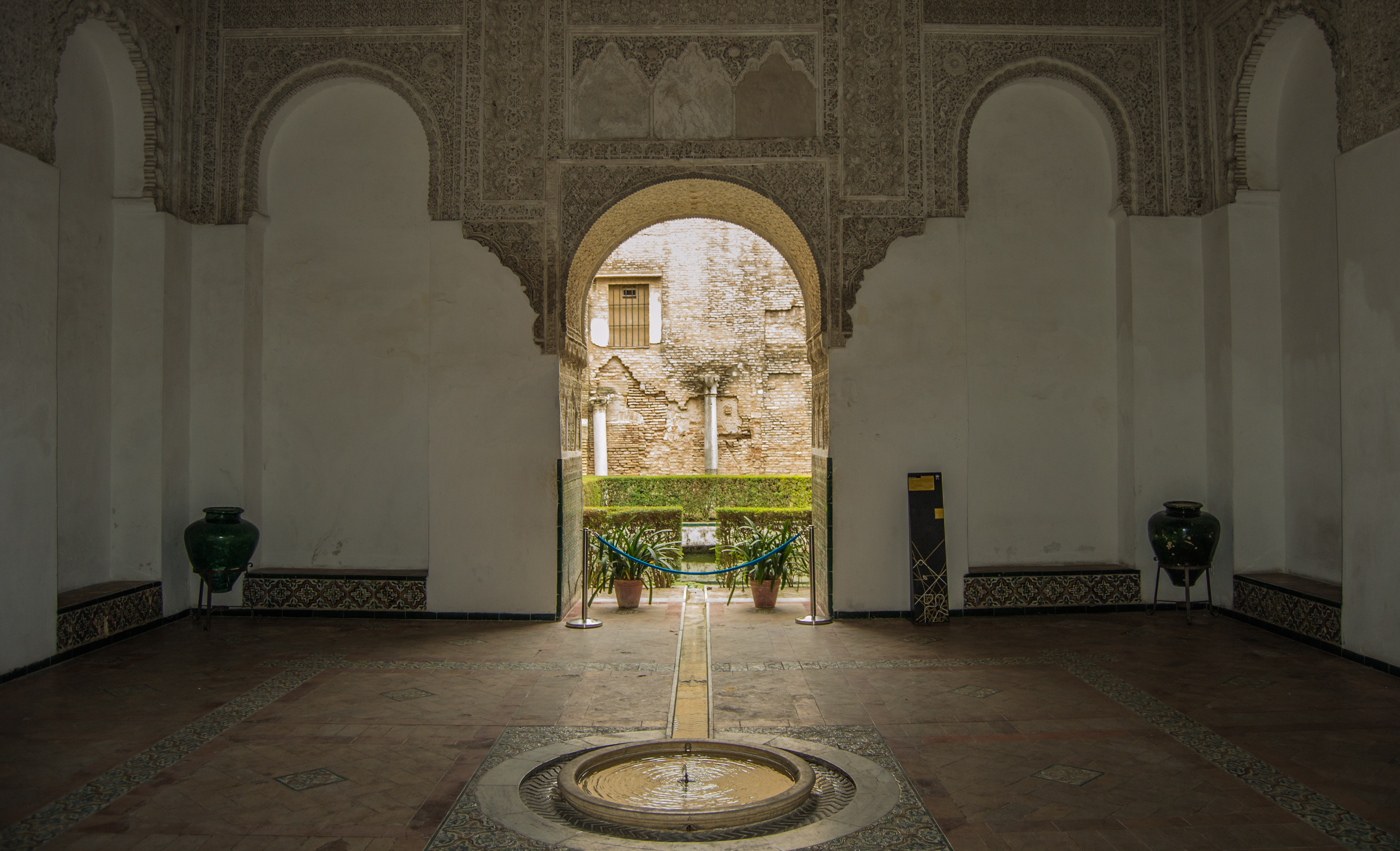
Sala de Justicia

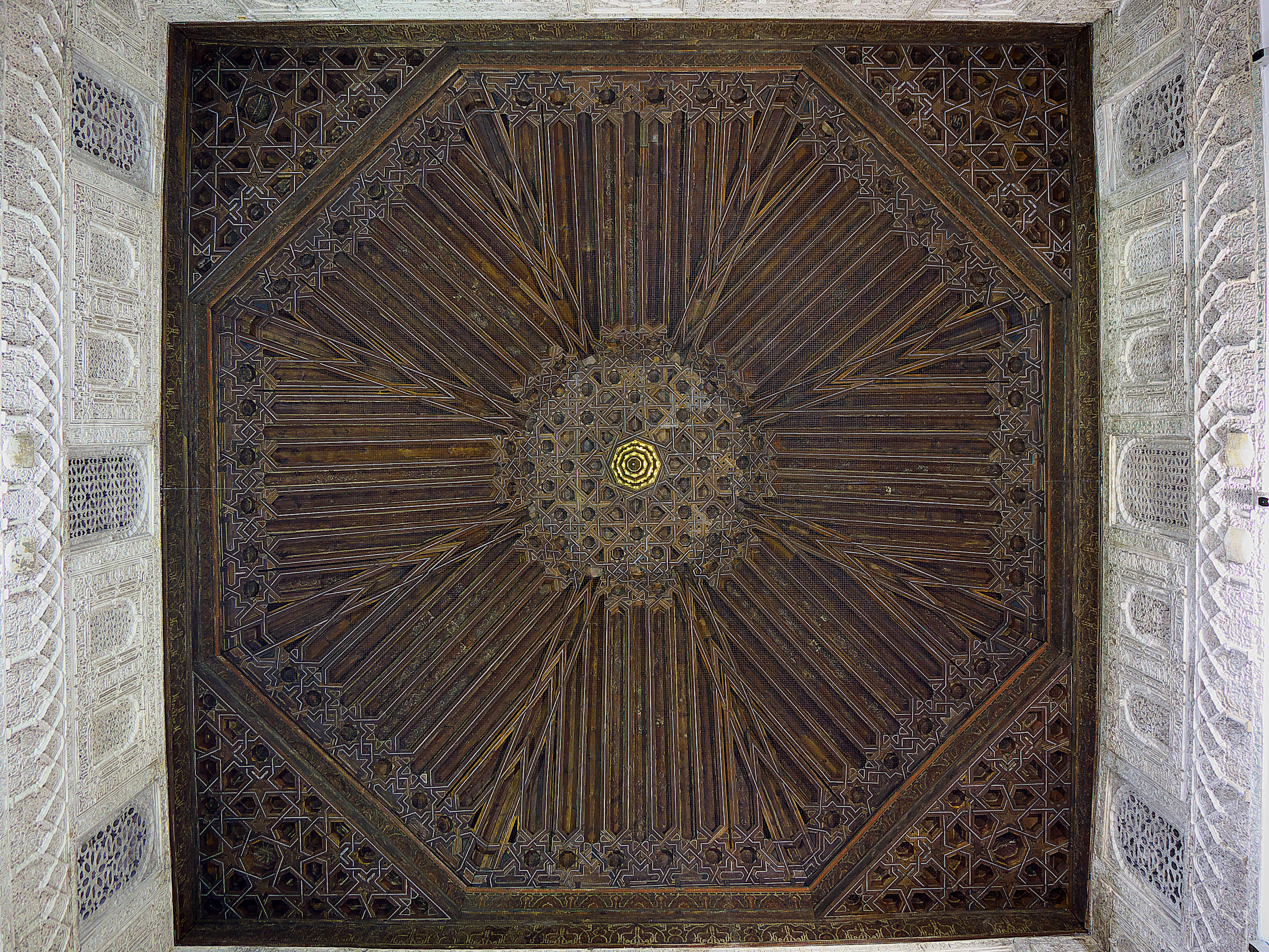
Artesonado of the Sala de la Justicia, Mudéjar hall ordered to be built by Alfonso XI of Castile (1340). First Mudéjar structure in Seville

The Sala de Justicia (courtroom of Justice) is accessed through the Patio del León.

It has a square floor plan, is Mudéjar in style and was built in the reign of Alfonso XI of Castile. It is a square room with an artesonado (qubba). In it there is a shield of the Order of the Band, created by Alfonso XI around 1340. The room would have been built in 1340. However, although the room was dated in the reign of Alfonso XI thanks, among other details, to this shield, the shield of that order also appears in other parts of the palace decorated in the reign of his son, Peter. It is similar to the Sala de Comares of the Alhambra. In the 16th and 17th centuries it was known as the Sala de los Consejos. It is most likely that it was an Almohad room used to gather a council (maswar) and that it was reformed with Mudéjar art by the Christians, who continued to use it for the same purpose. This was probably the room where the court presided by Peter was located, although there are other hypotheses about its possible location. In this court there were three brick steps with a stone throne, although this structure was demolished before the visit of Philip II in 1570. This action displeased Philip II, who was a great admirer of King Don Peter and who was the first to indicate that he should be called "the Avenger".

In the centre of the hall is a fountain with a shallow drain down to the Patio del Yeso, and round the walls are brick and tile benches.

=== Patio del Yeso ===
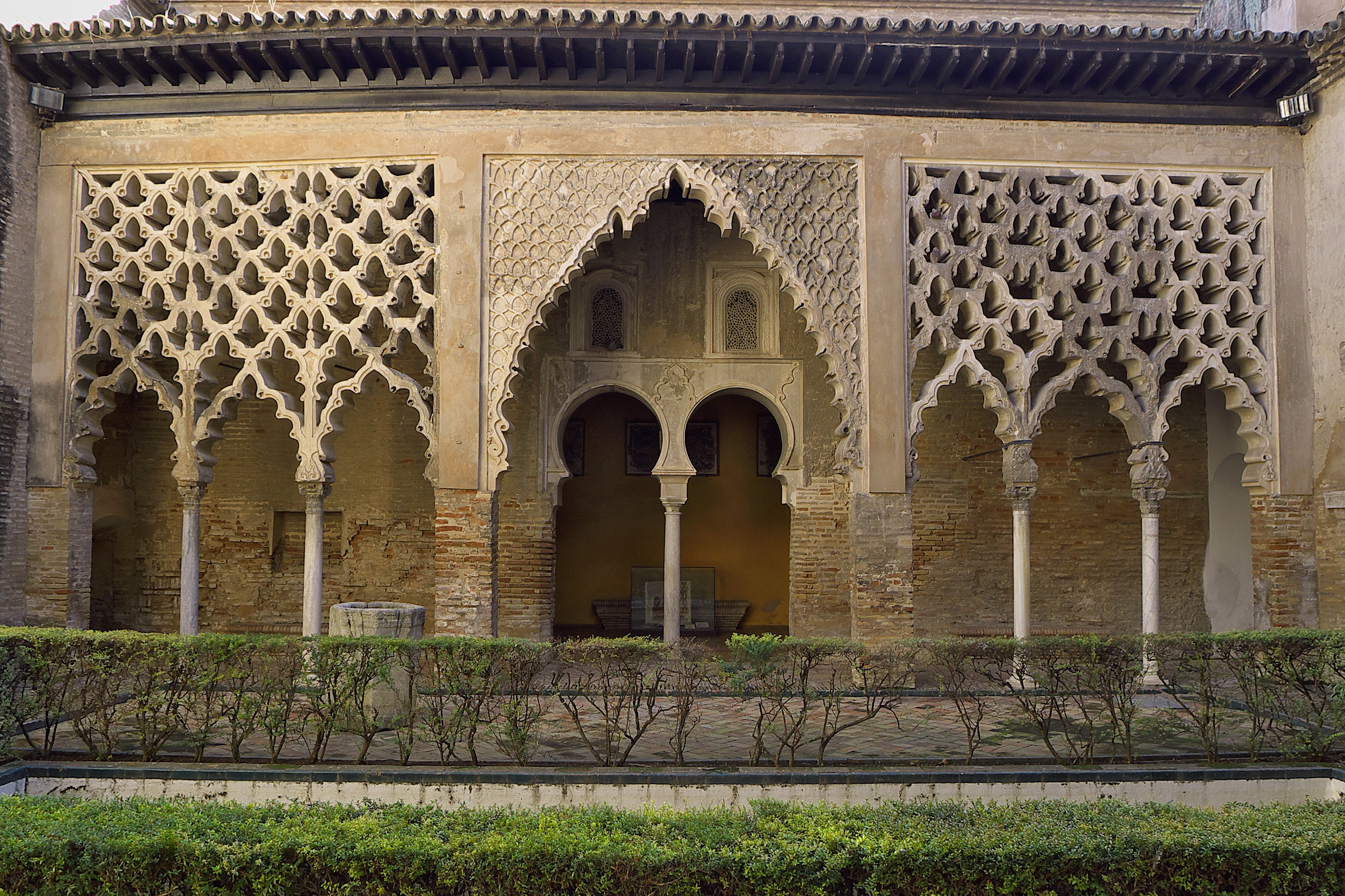
The south portico of the Patio del Yeso (Courtyard of the Plaster), one of the few remaining elements from the Almohad-era palace (end of the 12th century).

From the Sala de Justicia one enters the Patio del Yeso, which was built at the end of the 12th century, by Ali al-Ghumari from the Almohad period, almost square in plan, with a pool in the center and arcaded arches on each side of the courtyard, on which there is rich decoration. On the south side there are caliphal columns that support arches with decoration (sebka) of plaster. This decoration covers a porch. In the porch there is an entrance consisting of two horseshoe arches with a column in the center. On the lintel of this entrance there are two windows. On the opposite wall there is a walled exit with three horseshoe arches in the Córdoban caliphal style. This patio has undergone several alterations throughout its history. The entire wall where the sebka arches were located was found covered. It was discovered by Francisco María Tubino in 1890. The Marquis of Vega-Inclán, then curator of the Alcázar, commissioned in 1912 its recovery and restoration to the architect José Gómez Millán. In the courtyard of the old mosque, the arches were uncovered, the capitals were cleaned, and the floor of the courtyard were excavated at the foot of the columns. The courtyard although restored, the walls and horshoe arcades are well preserved with their Almohad ornamentation.

=== Patio de la Montería ===
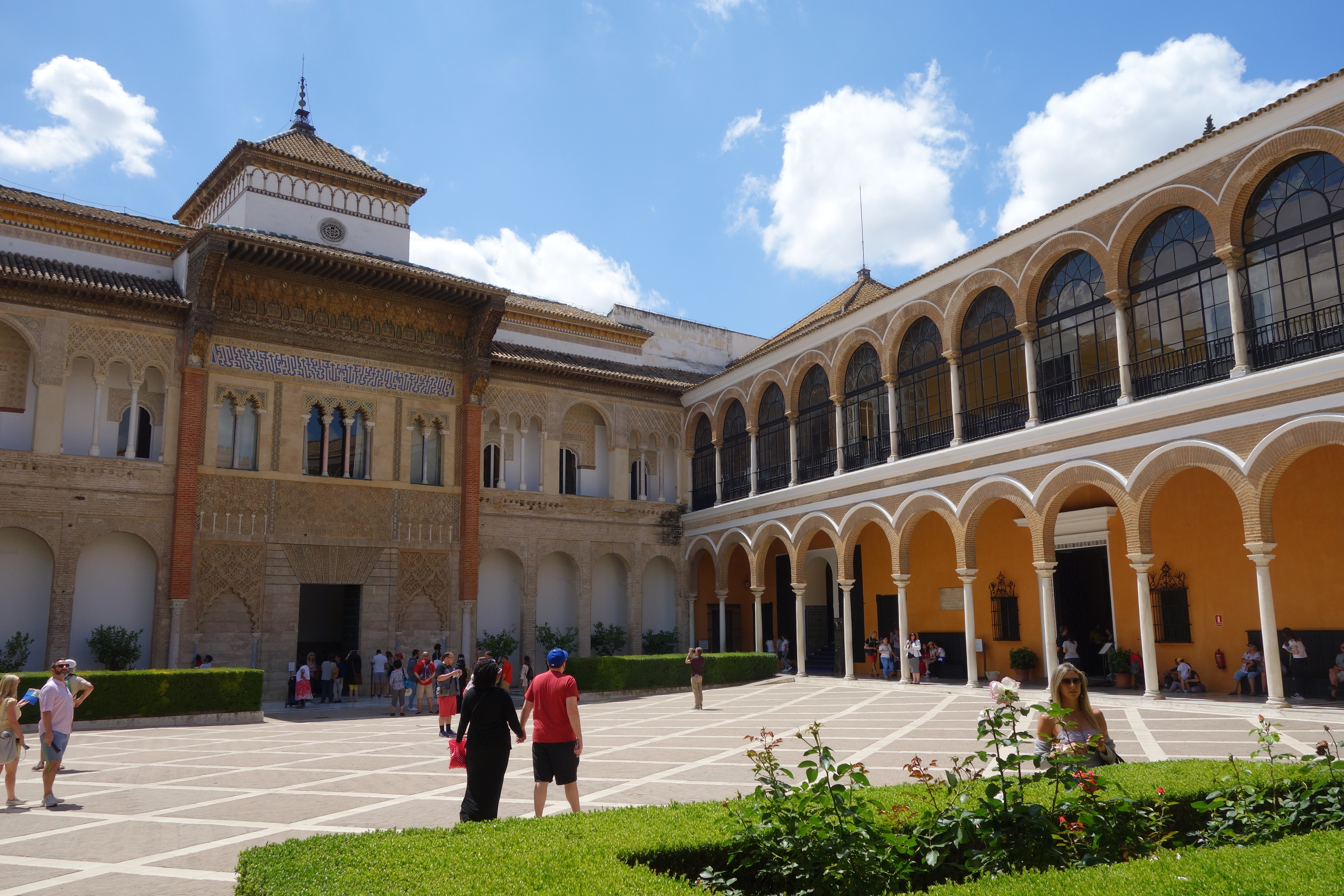
Palace of Peter to the left and the Casa de Contratación to the right.

Patio de la Montería (Courtyard of the Hunt). This is the main courtyard, and was built when Palace of Peter was built in 1364, and is presided over by the door of the palace of Peter. In the walls there are semicircular arches that were walled up in the 15th century.

To the right are the rooms of the Casa de Contratación, who built in 1503 and there met the merchants who made contracts there when there was a boom in trade from Seville with Spanish America and the Philippines. The Casa de Contratación has a porticoed gallery from the 17th century made by Antón Sánchez Hurtado, the eastern side of the Casa de Contratación was built by the Belgian architect Sebastian Van der Borcht in 1755, after the Lisbon earthquake.

Halls faces the square courtyard, its area was occupied by a Almohad sunken garden at a level of 1.5 meters beneath the halls, it had two walkways, and had a channel to irrigate the garden. In 1997, other Alhomad palace was discovered beneath the Patio de la Montería, the building was built around 1150, it was demolished in 1356 for the construction of the Palace of Peter of Castile.

=== Patio de las Doncellas ===
The name, meaning "The Courtyard of the Maidens", is a reference to the apocryphal story that the Muslim rulers demanded an annual tribute of 100 virgins from the Christian kingdoms of Iberia.

The courtyard was part of the Mudéjar palace built by Pedro I in the 1360s. The ground level of the building still dates to this period and contains Arabic inscriptions that refer to Pedro I as "Sultan Don Bidru". The upper story of the courtyard was an addition made by Charles V. The addition was designed by Luis de Vega in the style of the Italian Renaissance although he did include both Renaissance and mudéjar plaster work in the decorations. Construction of the addition began in 1540 and ended in 1572.

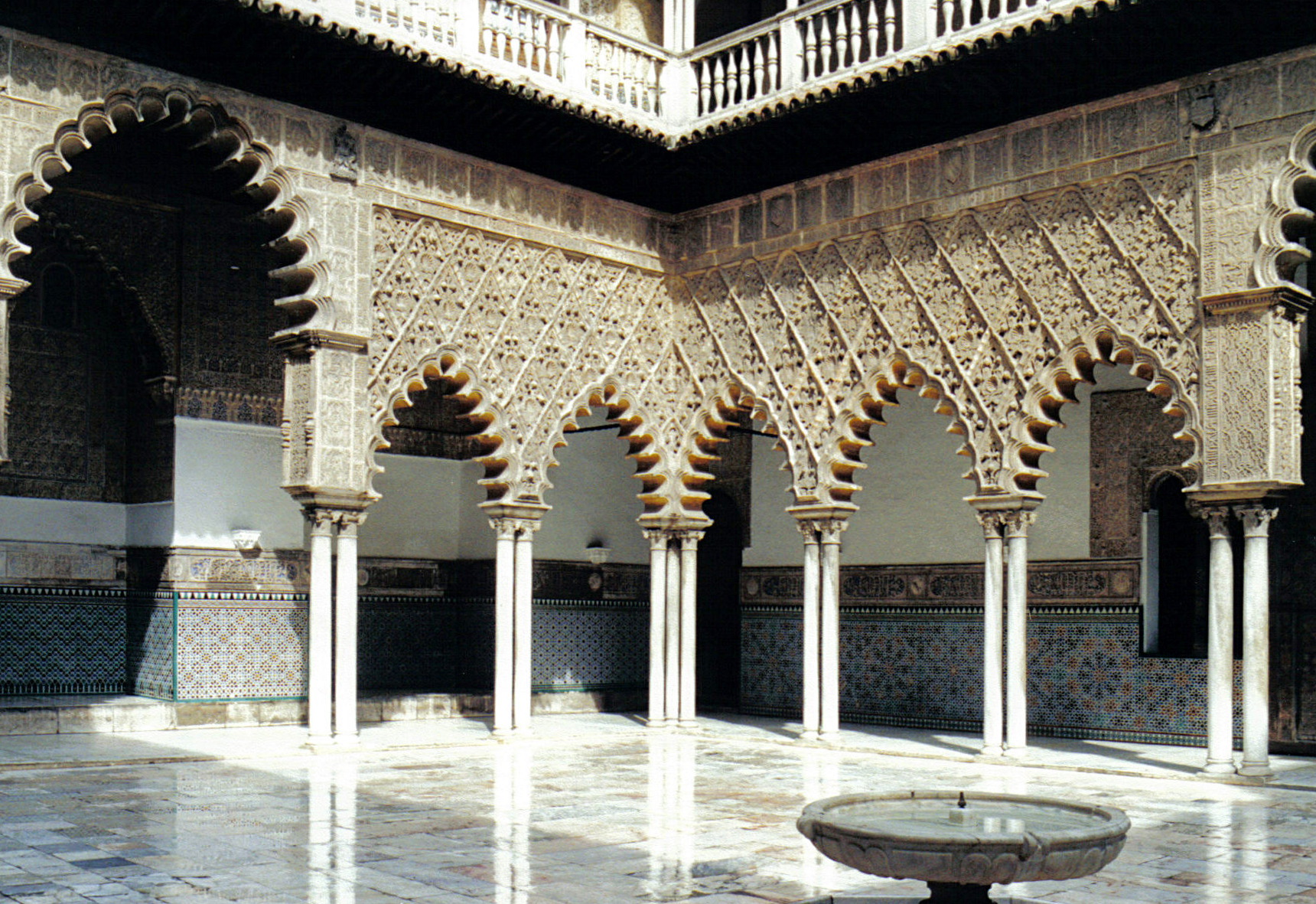
The patio de las Doncellas in 2000, with the marble pavement laid in 1581–1584.

At ground level, several reception rooms are arranged around a long rectangular reflecting pool that runs the entire length of the patio, creating a water line. This pool is surrounded by promenades covered with a red brick pavement decorated with green ceramic borders, similar to the pavement that adorns the perimeter of the garden. The pool and its promenades are bordered by two flowerbeds located one meter beneath the pavement whose sides are decorated with a frieze of interlaced semi-circular arches.

The current appearance of the courtyard garden is the result of a reconstruction carried out in the 21st century following the excavations carried out between 2002 and 2005 by a team of archaeologists led by Miguel Ángel Tabales. The garden and the pool, built between 1356 and 1366, were buried between 1581 and 1584 when the courtyard was paved by Juan Bautista de Zumárraga with a white and black marble pavement and an alabaster fountain in the center. The patio maintained this appearance until its original structure was discovered and the hidden garden was uncovered after the 2002–2005 excavations, which revealed the good state of conservation of the area under the patio. The ancient Mudejar garden was restored after being hidden for centuries under a marble floor.

=== Los Baños de Doña María de Padilla ===
The Baños de Doña María de Padilla ("Baths of Lady María de Padilla") is a chamber located in a basement beneath the Patio del Crucero. It is named after María de Padilla, the mistress of Pedro I, although the structure itself is unrelated to her and dates instead to the Gothic palace of Alfonso X. It consists of an elongated water basin, or cistern, roofed by a series of Gothic cross-ribbed vaults.

=== Salón de los Embajadores ===
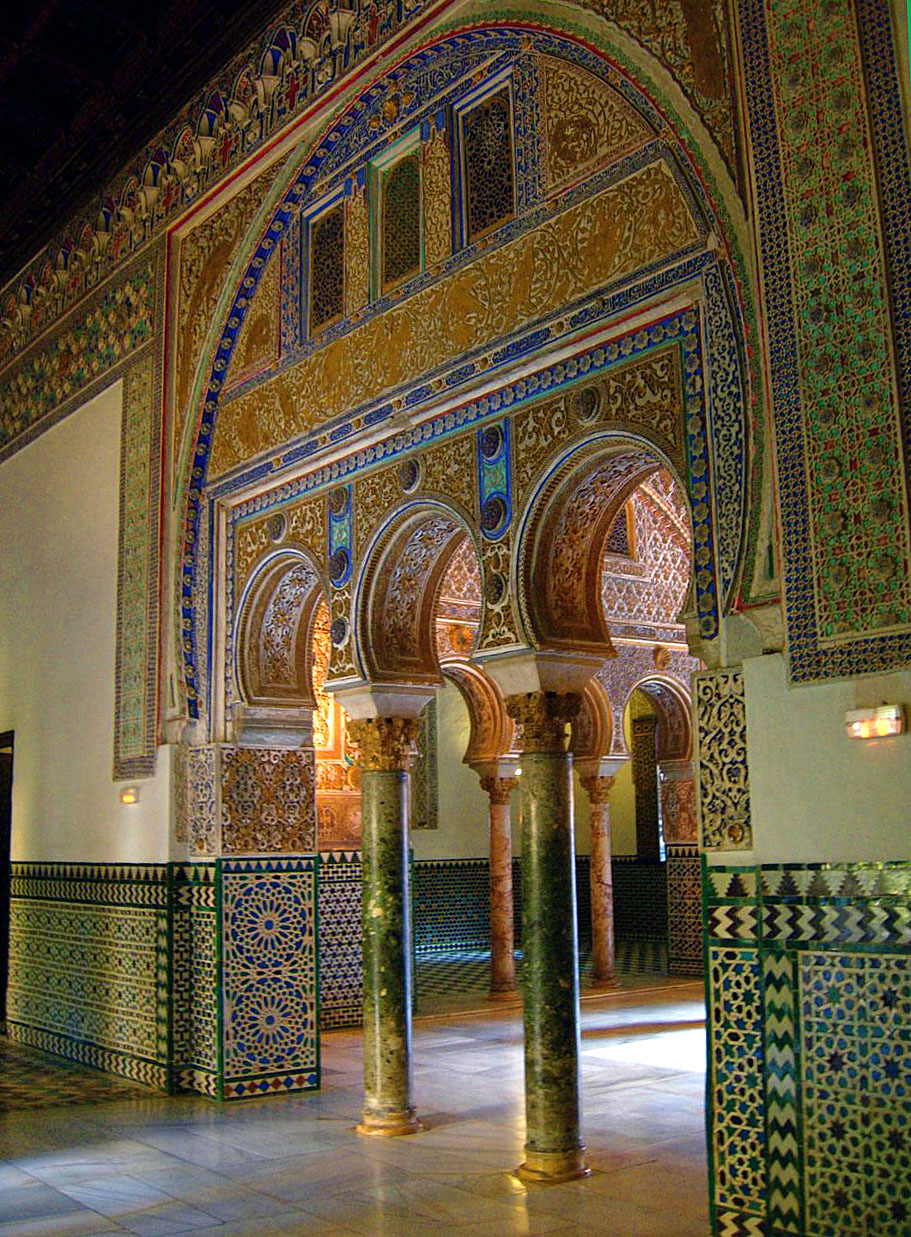
One of the archway entrances to Salón de los Embajadores (Hall of Ambassadors).

The Hall of the Ambassadors (Salon de los Embajadores) dates from the 14th century, when Pedro I of Castile made it a centerpiece of his new royal palace. One hypothesis states that Pedro reused and remodeled a much older hall, known as the Hall of the Pleiades, built by the Abbadid ruler al-Mu'tamid, but this theory has not been widely accepted.

The hall has a square shape and is covered by a dome, analogical to the qubba-type structures of Islamic architecture. During Pedro's construction, the orientation of the hall was changed from facing Mecca (to the east) to the northeast, where it opens to the Patio de las Doncellas through a central doorway. At the middle of each of the other three sides of the hall is a central doorway consisting of a triple horseshoe arch supported by marble columns. Each of the triple arches is enclosed by a decorative rectangular frame (alfiz), which in turn is enclosed by a semi-circular frame within a larger rectangular frame. Beyond each of these archways is a wide rectangular room, leading in turn to other rooms. The lower walls of the Hall of Ambassadors are decorated with a dado of tiles, while the walls above are decorated with rich plasterwork. A row of windows with delicate stucco grilles runs along the top of the walls, below the dome.

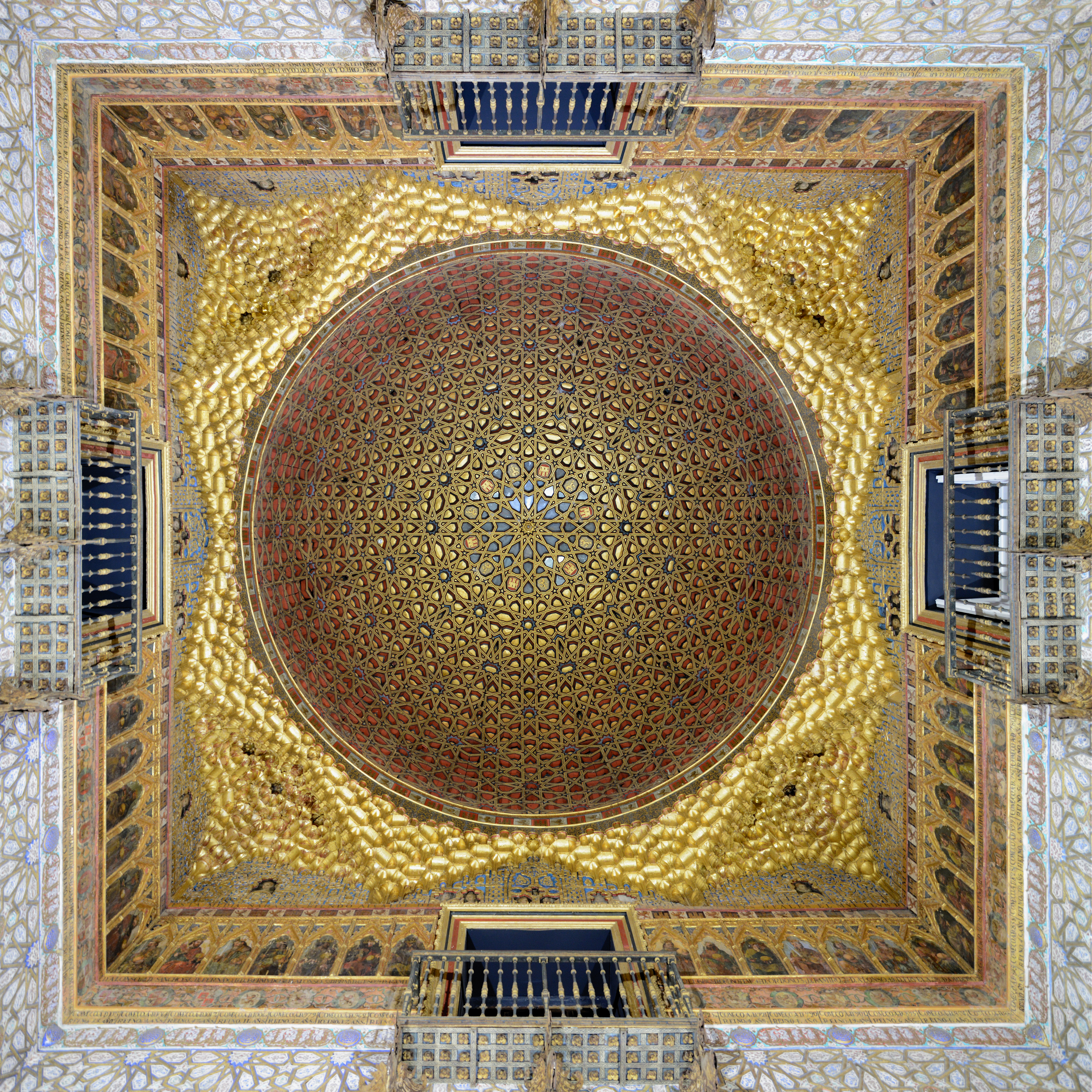
Dome ceiling in the Hall of Ambassadors.

The hall's decoration was finished in 1366, as recorded by an Arabic inscription on a set of wooden doors that was made by artisans from Toledo. The current dome over the hall was rebuilt in 1427 to replace the original dome. The balconies in the upper walls were added in the 16th century. In 1526, Emperor Charles V and Isabella of Portugal celebrated their marriage in this room.

=== Other sections ===
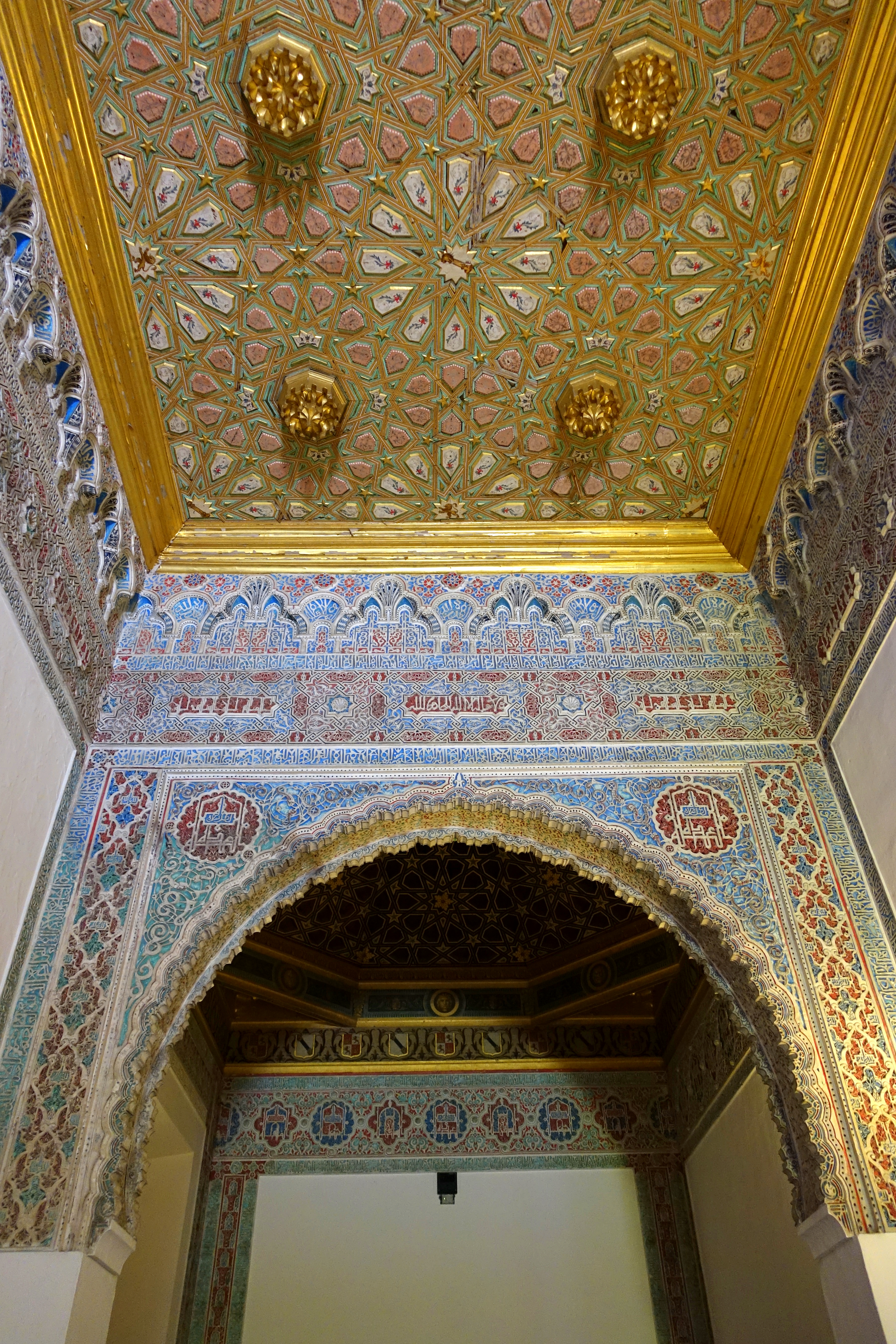
Cuarto del Príncipe.

- Patio de las Muñecas (Courtyard of the Dolls)
- Dormitorio de los Reyes Moros (Bedroom of the Moorish Kings)
- Cuarto del Almirante (Admiral's Room)
- Casa de Contratación (Casa de Contratación)
- Patio del Crucero (Courtyard of the Crossing)
- Palacio Mudéjar or de Pedro I (Mudéjar Palace or that of Peter of Castile)
  - Patio de las Muñecas (Courtyard of the Dolls)
  - Cuarto del Príncipe (Prince's Room)
  - Patio de las Doncellas (Courtyard of the Maidens)
  - Salón del Techo de Carlos V (Charles V Ceiling Room)
  - Salón de Embajadores (Ambassadors' Room)
  - Salón del Techo de Felipe II (Philip II Ceiling Room)
  - Primera planta (First level of the Palace of Peter of Castile)
- Palacio Gótico (Gothic Palace)
  - Capilla (Chapel)
  - Gran Salón (Big Room)
  - Salón de los Tapices (Tapestries' Room)
  - Sala de las Bóvedas (Vaults' Room)
- Upper floors belong to the Patrimonio Nacional and are occupied by the royal family when visiting Seville. There are many security measures for visitors; admission is approximately 5 euros.
  - Vestíbulo or Saleta de la Reina Isabel la Católica (Lobby or Queen Isabella the Catholic Monarch's Room)
  - Anteortaorio de Isabel la Católica (Pre-oratory of Isabella the Catholic Monarch)
  - Oratorio de Isabel la Católica (Oratory of Isabella the Catholic Monarch)
  - Alcoba Real (Royal Bedroom)
  - Antecomedor (Pre-dining Room)
  - Comedor de Gala (Gala Dining)
  - Sala de fumar (Smoking Room)
  - Retrete del Rey (King's Toilet)
  - Antecomedor de familia, antiguo Cuarto del Rey (Family Pre-dining Room, former King's Room)
  - Comedor de Familia or Cuarto Nuevo (Family Dining Room or New Room)
  - Mirador de los Reyes Católicos (Viewpoint of the Catholic Monarchs)
  - Dormitorio del Rey Don Pedro, antiguo Cuarto de los Lagartos (King Don Peter of Castile's Bedroom, former Lizards' Room)
  - Despacho de Juan Carlos I (Juan Carlos I's Office)
  - Cámara de Audiencias (Hearings' Chamber)
  - Dormitorio de Isabel II (Isabella II's Bedroom)
  - Colección Carranza (a museum of old azulejos)
- Gardens
  - Estanque de Mercurio (Mercury Pond)
  - Galería de Grutesco (Grotesque Gallery)
  - Jardín de la Danza (Dance's Garden)
  - Jardín de Troya (Troy's Garden)
  - Jardín de la Galera (The Galley's Garden)
  - Jardín de las Flores (Flowers' Garden)
  - Jardín del Príncipe (Prince's Garden)
  - Jardín de las Damas (Ladies' Garden)
  - Pabellón de Carlos V (Charles V's Pavilion)
  - Cenador del León (Lion's Gloriette)
  - Jardín Inglés (English Garden)
  - Jardín del Marqués de la Vega-Inclán (Marquis of la Vega-Inclán's Garden)
  - Jardín de los Poetas (The Poets' Garden)
- Apeadero (Mounting-block)
  - Patio de Banderas (Flags' Courtyard)
- Walls of the Alcázar

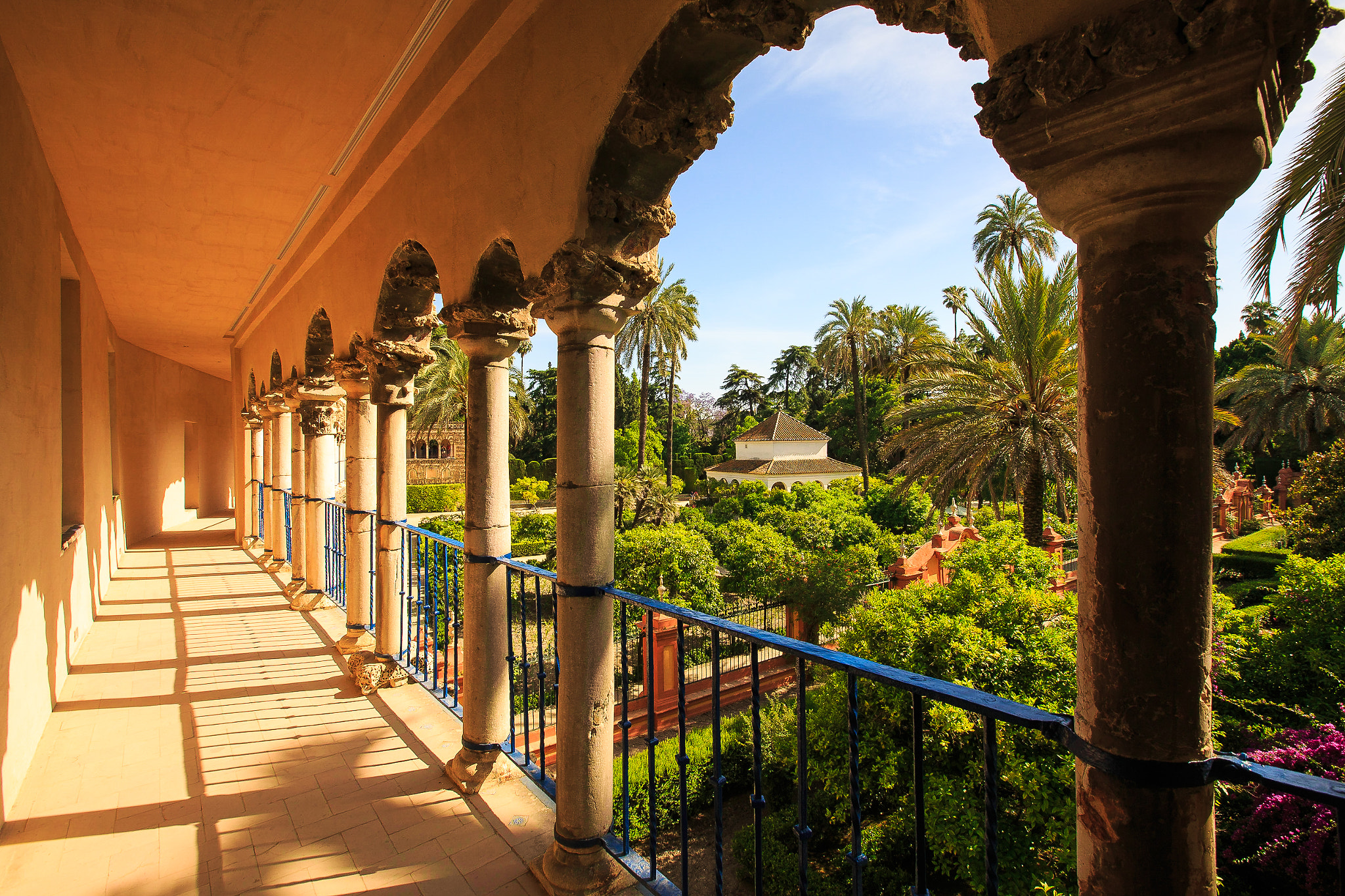
Gallery of the Grottoesque

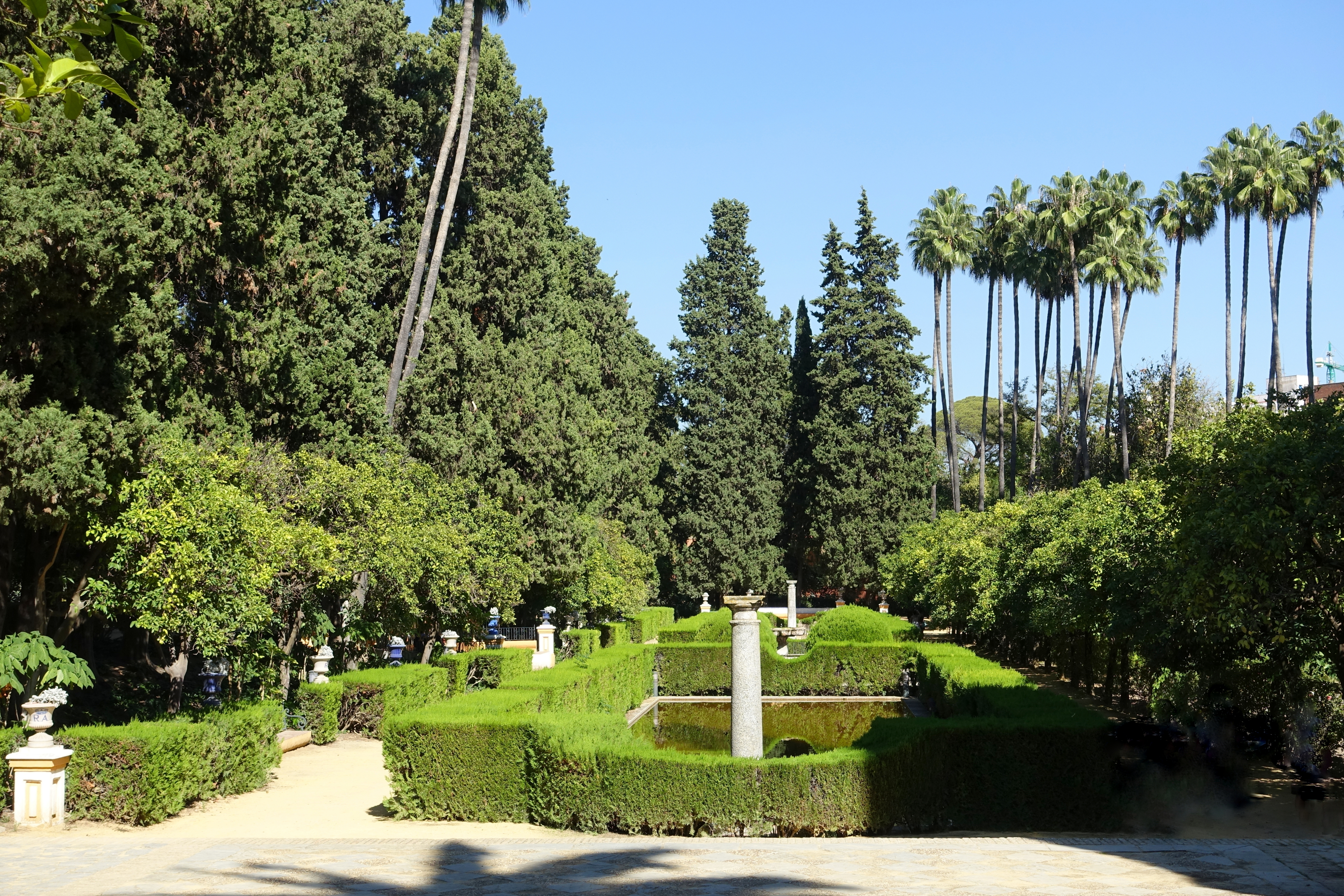
Garden of the poets

== The gardens ==
All the palaces of Al Andalus had garden orchards with fruit trees, horticultural produce and a wide variety of fragrant flowers. The garden-orchards not only supplied food for the palace residents but had the aesthetic function of bringing pleasure. Water was ever present in the form of irrigation channels, runnels, jets, ponds and pools.

The gardens adjoining the Alcázar of Seville have undergone many changes. In the 17th century during the reign of Philip III the Italian designer Vermondo Resta introduced the Italian Mannerist style. Resta was responsible for the Galeria de Grutesco (Grotto Gallery) transforming the old Muslim wall into a loggia from which to admire the view of the palace gardens.

== In popular culture ==
- In 1962 the Alcázar was used as a set for Lawrence of Arabia.
- The Alcázar was used as the set for the court of the King of Jerusalem in the 2005 movie Kingdom of Heaven.
- Part of the fifth season of Game of Thrones was shot in several locations in the province of Seville, including the Alcázar.

== See also ==
- The Virgin of the Navigators
- Azulejo
- High medieval domes
- Late medieval domes
