= Humaitá, Porto Alegre =

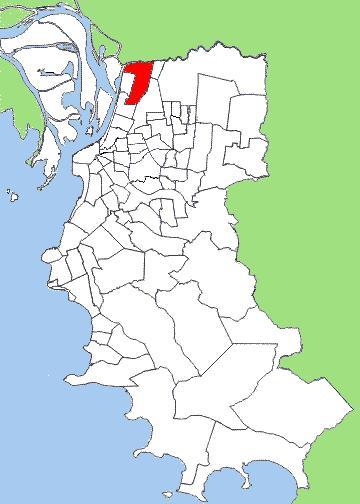
Humaitá compared to other neighborhoods in Porto Alegre

Humaitá is a neighbourhood (bairro) in the city of Porto Alegre, the state capital of Rio Grande do Sul, in Brazil. It was created by Law 6218 from November 17, 1988.

The Arena do Grêmio, home stadium of Grêmio Foot-Ball Porto Alegrense is located in the neighbourhood.

Humaitá is next to the municipality of Canoas.
