= Port of Porto Alegre =

The Port of Porto Alegre
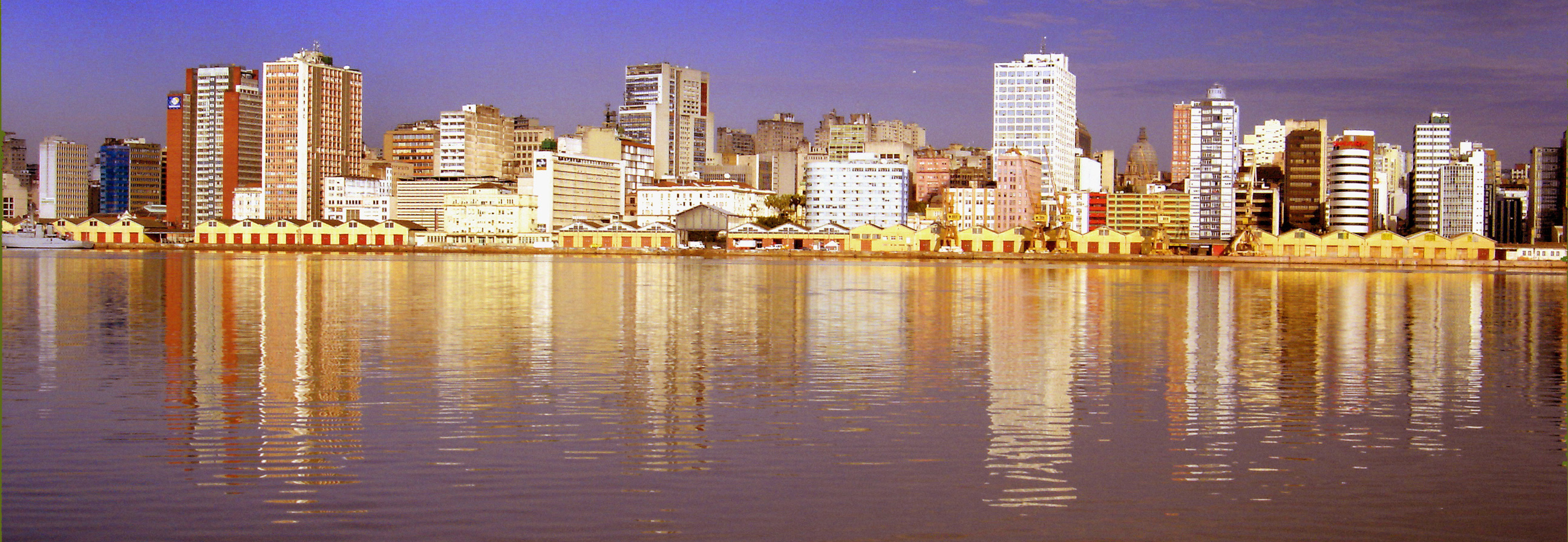
- The port on the far end

Location
- Country: Brazil
- Location: Porto Alegre, Rio Grande do Sul
- Coordinates: 30°1′3″S 51°13′42″W

Details
- Opened: 1921
- Operated by: Administração do Porto de Porto Alegre
- Type of harbour: Riverport
- Size: Medium
- Port Director: Paulo Ricardo Lomando

Statistics
- Website; The Port of Porto Alegre

The Port of Porto Alegre is an inland port located in Guaíba Lake in Porto Alegre, Rio Grande do Sul, Brazil. It is connected to Downtown Porto Alegre. Superintendência de Portos e Hidrovias (SPH) was established to manage and distribute cargoes throughout the State of Rio Grande do Sul.
