= Segredinho Creek =

Location
- Country: Brazil
- State: Rio Grande do Sul
- Municipality: Ipê

Physical characteristics
- Source
  - location: Vila Segredo, Ipê
  - coordinates: 28°43′51.2″S 51°16′47.3″W
- Mouth: Humatã River

Basin features
- River system: Bacia Hidrográfica Taquari-Antas

The Segredinho Creek (Portuguese: Arroio Segredinho), also known as the Segredinho River, is a river in Brazil in the state of Rio Grande do Sul, a tributary of the left bank of the Humatã River.

== See also ==
- Leão River
- Prata River
- Ituim River
- Da Telha River
