= Banhados do Delta Biological Reserve =

Biological reserve in the Jacuí River delta, Rio Grande do Sul, Brazil

- Reserva Biológica dos Banhados do Delta do Jacuí
- IUCN category Ia (strict nature reserve)
- Location within Brazil
- Nearest city: Porto Alegre
- Coordinates: 30.014°S 51.248°W
- Designation: Biological reserve
- Created: 14 January 1976
- Administrator: SEMA Rio Grande do Sul

Banhados do Delta do Jacuí Biological Reserve (Portuguese: Reserva Biológica dos Banhados do Delta do Jacuí) is a biological reserve in the Jacuí River delta in Rio Grande do Sul, Brazil.

== History ==
The Jacuí Delta State Park (Portuguese: Parque Estadual do Delta do Jacuí) was established on 14 January 1976. The islands of Pólvora and Pombas were designated as a Biological Reserve, and other areas could be expropriated. The park covered 17,245 hectares (42,610 acres). It is located in the Porto Alegre metropolitan region in the municipalities of Eldorado do Sul, Nova Santa Rita, Canoas, Triunfo, Charqueadas and Porto Alegre.

In February 2004 the state's Department of the Environment presented a proposal to create the Jacuí Delta Environmental Protection Area (APA), which would include the state park with the addition of 9,755 hectares (24,110 acres) to give a total area of 26,269 hectares (64,910 acres). The proposal would include creating the Banhados do Delta Biological Reserve, with an area of 13,369 hectares (33,040 acres), to be used only for scientific studies, with full protection of species.

The state park's limits were redefined on 11 November 2005. The outcome was that the APA, which covers 22,826 hectares (56,400 acres) including privately owned land, supports the use of natural resources in a sustainable manner according to a management plan. The State Park portion, which covers 14,242 hectares (35,190 acres) all of which is publicly owned, aims to preserve the natural landscape and ecosystem for scientific, educational and recreational use.

== Environment ==
The area containing the biological reserve is a water complex formed by the rivers Caí, Sinos, Gravataí and Jacuí, which form Lake Guaíba. There are thirty islands and mainland areas. Where the rivers meet the Gravataí is heavily polluted by urbanization and industry, and the Caí and Sinos are heavily polluted by environmental waste. The boundaries of the islands are constantly shifting. The vegetation is typical of wetlands in the region. Despite the proximity to the city, endangered species are found in the delta including otter, capybara and broad-snouted caiman.

== Sources ==
- Parque e APA Estadual do Delta do Jacuí (PDF) (in Portuguese), Pontifícia Universidade Católica do Rio Grande do Sul, archived from the original (PDF) on 2016-05-30
- Pedro Saldanha Frantz (25–31 July 2010), LEGISLAÇÃO ENVOLVENDO OS CARROCEIROS DO DELTA DO JACUÍ (in Portuguese), Porto Alegre, ISBN 978-85-99907-02-3, archived from the original on 21 December 2016
- Representantes das Ihas Conhecem Proposta de Nova APA do Delta (in Portuguese), Secretaria do Ambiente e Desenvolvimento Sustentável do Rio Grande do Sul, 26 February 2004, archived from the original on 2016-05-09
