= Segredo River =

Location
- Country: Brazil
- State: Rio Grande do Sul

Physical characteristics
- Source
  - location: Vila Segredo, Ipê
- Mouth: Humatã River

Basin features
- River system: Taquari-Antas Hydrographic Basin
- Cities: Ipê, Antônio Prado
- Bridges: Segredo Bridge

The Segredo River (Portuguese: Rio Segredo) is a river in Brazil in the state of Rio Grande do Sul, a tributary of the left bank of the Humatã River.

It also forms part of the border between the municipalities of Ipê and Antônio Prado.

In September 2023, due to heavy rainfall, the Segredo River experienced a significant rise in its narrow bed, resulting in the erosion of the bridge abutment in the Caravaggio locality. The event caused structural damage to the bridge and the embankment on both banks.

== See also ==
- Leão River
- Prata River
- Ituim River
- Da Telha River
