= Piraçupiá River =

Santa Rita River

Location
- Country: Brazil

Physical characteristics
- Source
  - location: Rio Grande do Sul state
- Mouth: Humatã River
  - location: Muitos Capões
  - coordinates: 28°12′12″S 51°09′40″W

Basin features
- River system: Taquari-Antas

The Piraçupiá River, also known as Santa Rita River (Portuguese: rio Santa Rita) is a river of Rio Grande do Sul state in southern Brazil. It is a tributary of the Humatã River.

== See also ==
- List of rivers of Rio Grande do Sul
- Das Antas river
- Da Telha river
- Ituim river
