= Hemiancistrus votouro =

Conservation status
- Least Concern (IUCN 3.1)

Scientific classification
- Kingdom: Animalia
- Phylum: Chordata
- Class: Actinopterygii
- Order: Siluriformes
- Family: Loricariidae
- Genus: Hemiancistrus
- Species: H. votouro

Binomial name
- Hemiancistrus votouro A. R. Cardoso & J. F. P. da Silva, 2004

Species of catfish

Hemiancistrus votouro is a species of freshwater ray-finned fish belonging to the family Loricariidae, the suckermouth armoured catfishes, and the subfamily Hypostominae, the suckermouth catfishes. This catfish is endemic to Brazil where it occurs in the upper drainage of the Uruguay River in the drainages of the Passo Fundo and Erechim rivers, and in the Toropi River, in Rio Grande do Sul. This species reaches a total length of 14.1 cm (5.6 in).The specific name, votouro, refers to the type locality the Votouro Indian Reserve, situated in Benjamin Constant, Rio Grande do Sul.
