= List of rivers of Rio Grande do Sul =

List of rivers in Rio Grande do Sul (Brazilian State).

The list is arranged by drainage basin from north to south, with respective tributaries indented under each larger stream's name and ordered from downstream to upstream. All rivers in Rio Grande do Sul drain to the Atlantic Ocean.

== By Drainage Basin ==
=== Atlantic Coast/Lagoa dos Patos ===
Lagoa dos Patos is connected to the Atlantic by the Rio Grande inlet.

- Mampituba River
- Três Forquilhas River
- Maquiné River
- Tramandaí River
- Lagoa dos Patos
  - Guaíba River
    - Gravataí River
    - Dos Sinos River
      - Paranhana River
      - Rolante River
    - Jacuí River
      - Caí River
        - Maratá River
        - Cadeia River
        - Forromeco River
          - Canastra River
            - Jaguari River
        - Pinhal River
        - Do Ouro River
        - Piaí River
        - Caracol River
      - Taquari River
        - Taquari-Mirim River
        - Forqueta River
          - Forquetinha River
        - Guaporé River
        - Carreiro River
          - São Domingos River
        - Das Antas River
          - Da Prata River
            - Humatã River (Turvo River)
              - Segredinho Creek
              - Segredo River
                - Tupã Creek
              - Ituim River
                - Faxinal Creek
                - Da Telha River
                  - Arroio Trabuco
              - Piraçupiá River (Santa Rita River)
          - Quebra-Dentes River
          - Lajeado Grande River
          - Tomé River
          - Tainhas River
          - Camisas River
      - Pardo River
      - Botucaraí River
      - Vacacaí River
        - São Sepe River
      - Vacacaí-Mirim River
      - Soturno River
      - Jacuizinho River
        - Dos Caixões River
      - Ivaí River
      - Jacuí-Mirim River
      - Ibirubá River
  - Camaquã River
  - São Lourenço River
  - Arroio Pelotas
  - São Gonçalo Channel
    - Piratini River
    - Lagoa Mirim
      - Jaguarão River
- Arroio Chuí

=== Uruguay Basin ===
- Uruguay River
  - Río Negro
  - Quaraí River
    - Cati River
  - Ibicuí River
    - Ibirapuitã River
      - Ibirapuitã Chico River
    - Itu River
    - Jaguari River
      - Jaguarizinho River
    - Santa Maria River
      - Cacequi River
      - Ibicuí da Armada River
        - Ibicuí da Cruz River
    - Ibicuí-Mirim River
    - Toropi River
  - Icamaquã River
  - Do Meio River
  - Piratini River
    - Piraju River
  - Ijuí River
    - Ijuizinho River
    - Conceição River
    - Caxambu River
    - Fiúza River
  - Comandaí River
  - Amandaú River
  - Santo Cristo River
  - Santa Rosa River
  - Buricá River
  - Caá-Iari River
  - Turvo River
  - Guarita River
    - Ogarantim River (Fortaleza River)
  - Da Várzea River
    - Lajeado Grande River
  - Passo Fundo River
    - Erechim River
  - Douradinho River
  - Palomas River
    - Azul River
  - Dourado River
  - Lambedor River
  - Suzana River
  - Apuaê River
  - Inhandava River (Forquilha River)
  - Pelotas River
    - Bernardo José River
    - Suçuarana River
    - Socorro River
    - Dos Touros River
    - Cerquinha River

== Alphabetically ==
- Amandaú River
- Das Antas River
- Apuaê River
- Azul River
- Bernardo José River
- Boucaraí River
- Buricá River
- Caá-Iari River
- Cacequi River
- Cadeia River
- Caí River
- Dos Caixões River
- Camaquã River
- Camisas River
- Canastra River
- Carreiro River
- Cati River
- Caxambu River
- Cerquinha River
- Arroio Chuí
- Comandaí River
- Conceição River
- Douradinho River
- Dourado River
- Erechim River
- Fiúza River
- Forqueta River
- Forquetinha River
- Forromeco River
- Lajeado Grande River
- Gravataí River
- Guaíba River
- Guaporé River
- Guarita River
- Humaitã River (Turvo River)
- Ibicuí da Armada River
- Ibicuí da Cruz River
- Ibicuí River
- Ibicuí-Mirim River
- Ibirapuitã Chico River
- Ibirapuitã River
- Ibirubá River
- Icamaquã River
- Ijuí River
- Ijuizinho River
- Inhandava River (Forquilha River)
- Itu River
- Ituim River
- Ivaí River
- Jacuí River
- Jacuí-Mirim River
- Jacuizinho River
- Jaguarão River
- Jaguari River
- Jaguari River
- Jaguarizinho River
- Lambedor River
- Mampituba River
- Maquiné River
- Maratá River
- Do Meio River
- Río Negro
- Ogarantim River (Fortaleza River)
- Do Ouro River
- Palomas River
- Paranhana River
- Pardo River
- Passo Fundo River
- Pelotas River
- Arroio Pelotas
- Piaí River
- Pinhal River
- Piraçupiá River (Santa Rita River)
- Piraju River
- Piratini River (Uruguay River)
- Piratini River (São Gonçalo Channel)
- Da Prata River
- Quaraí River
- Quebra-Dentes River
- Rolante River
- Santa Maria River
- Santa Rosa River
- Santo Cristo River
- São Domingos River
- São Gonçalo Channel
- São Lourenço River
- São Sepe River
- Dos Sinos River
- Socorro River
- Soturno River
- Suçuarana River
- Suzana River
- Tainhas River
- Taquari River
- Taquari-Mirim River
- Da Telha River
- Tomé River
- Toropi River
- Dos Touros River
- Tramandaí River
- Três Forquilhas River
- Turvo River
- Uruguay River
- Vacacaí River
- Vacacaí-Mirim River
- Da Várzea River
