= Jaguari River (Canastra River tributary) =

Location
- Country: Brazil

Physical characteristics
- Source
  - location: Rio Grande do Sul state
- Mouth: Canastra River
  - coordinates: 29°23′S 51°21′W

The Jaguari River (Canastra River) is a river in the state of Rio Grande do Sul in southern Brazil. It is a tributary of the Canastra River, and therefore indirectly of the Caí River.

== See also ==
- List of rivers of Rio Grande do Sul
