= Da Telha River =

Location
- Country: Brazil

Physical characteristics
- Source
  - location: Rio Grande do Sul state
- Mouth: Humaitã River
  - coordinates: 28°38′S 51°24′W

Basin features
- Cities: Vacaria, Muitos Capões, Ipê

The Rio da Telha is a river in Brazil located in the Northeast region of the state of Rio Grande do Sul, in the geographical area of the Campos de Cima da Serra. It is a component of the Taquari-Antas River Hydrographic Basin.

== Geography and Hydrography ==
The river's course is established on the border and territory of municipalities in the Serra Gaúcha, including Ipê and Muitos Capões.

Hydrographically, the Rio da Telha is a significant tributary of the Rio Saltinho, which in turn flows into the Rio Turvo, integrating the system of the Rio das Antas and, consequently, the Taquari-Antas Basin.

== See also ==
- Rio Leão
- Rio da Prata
- List of rivers of Rio Grande do Sul
