= Arroio Upacaraí =

Coordinates: 30°51′S 55°02′W

Location
- Country: Brazil

Physical characteristics
- Source
  - location: Rio Grande do Sul state
- Mouth
  - location: Santa Maria River

Arroio Upacaraí is a river of Rio Grande do Sul state in southern Brazil.

== See also ==
- List of rivers of Rio Grande do Sul
