= Lajeado Grande River (Das Antas River tributary) =

Location
- Country: Brazil

Physical characteristics
- Source
  - location: Rio Grande do Sul state
- Mouth: Das Antas River
  - coordinates: 28°50′S 50°51′W

The Lajeado Grande River is a river in the state of Rio Grande do Sul, Brazil. The river empties into the Das Antas River, the upper reaches of the Taquari River.

== See also ==
- List of rivers of Rio Grande do Sul
