= Hypostomus spiniger =

Scientific classification
- Kingdom: Animalia
- Phylum: Chordata
- Class: Actinopterygii
- Division: Teleostei
- Order: Siluriformes
- Family: Loricariidae
- Genus: Hypostomus
- Species: H. spiniger

Binomial name
- Hypostomus spiniger (Hensel, 1870)

Synonyms
- Plecostomus spiniger; Hypostomus limosus; Plecostomus limosus

Species of fish

Hypostomus spiniger, sometimes known as the spiny plated pleco, is a disputed species of catfish in the family Loricariidae with a complex history of classification.

== Description ==
Hypostomus spiniger reaches 28.3 cm (11.1 inches) in standard length and is believed to be a facultative air-breather. It is known to feed on detritus.

== Distribution and habitat ==
Hypostomus spiniger is native to South America, where it occurs in the Uruguay River and the Lagoa Dos Patos system in Argentina, Brazil, and Uruguay. It is usually found in areas with moderate current and sandy substrates. The water in which H. spiniger can be found typically has a temperature of 19.8 to 25.3 °C (67.6 to 77.5 °F), a turbidity of 22.4 to 74.2 NTU, a pH of 7.6 to 8.3, an oxygen concentration of 8.4 to 9.0 mg/L, and a conductivity of 567 to 1909 μS/cm.

== Taxonomy ==
Hypostomus spiniger was originally described by Hensel in 1870 as Plecostomus spiniger based on material from the Cadeia River, although Franz Steindachner synonymized it with Hypostomus commersoni in 1877. In 1888, Carl H. Eigenmann and Rosa S. Eigenmann described Plecostomus limosus from the Brazilian state of Rio Grande do Sul. In 1989, Malabarba listed H. limosus (which had been transferred into the genus Hypostomus after the invalidation of Plecostomus) as another synonym of H. commersoni.

In 2019, a taxonomic review conducted by Y. P. Cardoso, F. Brancolini, L. Protogino, A. Paracampo, S. Bogan, P. Posadas, and J. I. Montoya-Burgos found the H. commersoni species complex to consist of two distinct species: H. commersoni from the basins of the Paraná River, the Paraguay River, and the Río de La Plata, as well as a second species from the Uruguay River and the Lagoa Dos Patos. Of the two names originally assigned to specimens from the Dos Patos system, H. spiniger has priority, and as such it was revalidated. H. limosus is not considered a valid name by this 2019 review, although ITIS and GBIF list it as valid and H. spiniger as invalid.
