= Da Várzea River =

Da Várzea River may refer to:

- Da Várzea River (Iguazu River)
- Da Várzea River (Negro River)
- Da Várzea River (Rio Grande do Sul)
