= Santa Rosa River =

The Santa Rosa River may refer to:

- Santa Rosa River (Acre) in the state of Acre, Brazil
- Santa Rosa River (Rio Grande do Sul) in the state of Rio Grande do Sul, Brazil
