= Itu River =

Coordinates: 29°24′37″S 55°51′2″W

Location
- Country: Brazil

Physical characteristics
- Source
  - location: Rio Grande do Sul state
- Mouth
  - location: Ibicuí River

The Itu River (Portuguese, Rio Itu) is a river of Rio Grande do Sul state in southern Brazil. It is a tributary of the Ibicuí River, which in turn is a tributary of the Uruguay River.

== See also ==
- List of rivers of Rio Grande do Sul
