= Jaguarizinho River =

Location
- Country: Brazil

Physical characteristics
- Source
  - location: Rio Grande do Sul state
- Mouth: Jaguari River
  - coordinates: 29°31′S 54°46′W

The Jaguarizinho River is a river of Rio Grande do Sul state in southern Brazil. It is a tributary of the Jaguari River.

== See also ==
- List of rivers of Rio Grande do Sul
