= Tainhas River =

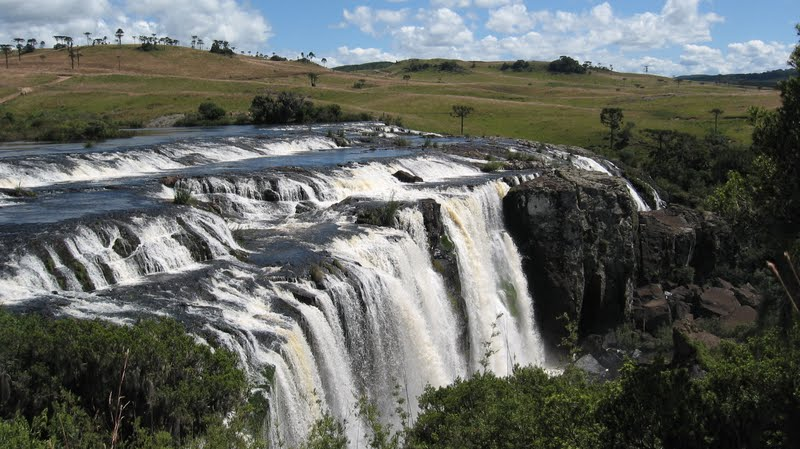
- Passo do "S"

- Tainhas River (Brazil)
- Native name: Rio Tainhas (Portuguese)

Location
- Country: Brazil

Physical characteristics
- Mouth
  - coordinates: 28.811888°S 50.604302°W

Basin features
- River system: Das Antas River.

Rio Tainhas (Portuguese: Rio Tainhas) is a river in the state of Rio Grande do Sul, Brazil. It is a left tributary of the Das Antas River. (Note: The Antas is known as the Taquari River further downstream.)

Part of the course of the river, including the Cachoeira do Passo do S, a waterfall, is protected by the 6,655-hectare (16,440-acre) Tainhas State Park, created in 1975.

== See also ==
- List of rivers of Rio Grande do Sul
