= Ogarantim River =

Ogarantim River Fortaleza River

Location
- Country: Brazil

Physical characteristics
- Source
  - location: Rio Grande do Sul state
- Mouth: Guarita River
  - coordinates: 27°37′S 53°23′W

The Ogarantim or Ogaratim River, also known as the Fortaleza River, is a river of Rio Grande do Sul state in southern Brazil.

== See also ==
- List of rivers of Rio Grande do Sul
