= Fiúza =

Fiúza is a surname. Notable people with the surname include:

- Joaquim Fiúza (1908–2010), Portuguese sailor
- Odete Fiúza (born 1972), Portuguese Paralympic athlete
- Yedo Fiúza (1894–1975), Brazilian politician

== See also ==
Fiúza River
