= Maratá River =

Location
- Country: Brazil

Physical characteristics
- Source
  - location: Rio Grande do Sul state
- Mouth: Caí River
  - coordinates: 29°39′S 51°26′W

The Maratá River is a river of Rio Grande do Sul state in southern Brazil. It is a tributary of the Caí River.

== See also ==
- List of rivers of Rio Grande do Sul
