= Ipê, Rio Grande do Sul =

Municipality in Rio Grande do Sul, Brazil

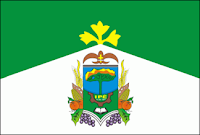
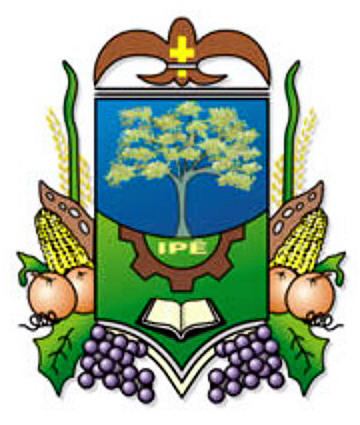
- Flag Coat of arms
- Motto(s): Ipê, uma cidade para todos
- Anthem: s:Hino do município de Ipê

- Location in Brazil
- Coordinates: 28°49′12″S 51°16′44″W
- Country: Brazil
- Region: South
- State: Rio Grande do Sul
- Founded: 15 December 1987

Government
  - Mayor: José Mario Grazziotin (MDB)

Area
  - City: 599.361 km^{2} (231.415 sq mi)
  - Urban: 3.78 km^{2} (1.46 sq mi)
- Lowest elevation: 750 m (2,460 ft)

Population (2022)
  - City: 5,399
  - Estimate (2025): 5,490
  - Density: 9.008/km^{2} (23.33/sq mi)
- Demonym: Ipean (Ipeense)
- Time zone: UTC-3 (UTC-3)
  - Summer (DST): Does not observe DST
- Postal Code: 95240-000
- Area code: +55 54
- HDI (2010): 0.728– high
- Website: www.pmipe.rs.gov.br

Ipê (Portuguese pronunciation: [ipe]) is a municipality in the state of Rio Grande do Sul, Brazil. As of 2020, the estimated population was 5,325.

== Geography ==
It is located at a latitude of 28º49'12" south and a longitude of 51º16'45" west, with an altitude of 750 meters.

It has an area of 599.36 km^{2} and its estimated population in 2022 was 5,325 inhabitants.

Ipê is one of the municipalities located in the Região da Uva e Vinho, where there is a significant presence of vineyards in the southern part of the municipality.

=== Hydrography ===
The hydrography of the municipality of Ipê is composed of a dense network of rivers, streams, and brooks, belonging entirely to the Taquari-Antas River Basin. The rugged terrain of the region favors the emergence of numerous springs that make up the local drainage. The territorial limits are defined by several watercourses, notably the Humatã River, the Da Telha River, and the Ituim River, which act as boundary elements alongside the Arroio Trabuco and the Arroio Pessegueiro.

Internally, the Segredo River, which originates in the Vila Segredo region and used to mark the boundary with Ipê, when both were districts of Vacaria. Its course passes through the locality of Avante Moinho before emptying into the Humatã River. The Humatã also receives waters such as those from the Arroio Segredinho, which defines part of the boundary between Vila Segredo and Vila São Paulino, the Arroio Faxinal with its headwaters in Vila São Paulino, and the Arroio Goiabeira, originating in Vila Segredo. The latter, together with the Humatã, is known to cause flooding in the Camping D'Alsasso area during periods of high water. The Leão River also integrates the municipality's water system.

In addition to the main cataloged rivers and streams, the rural area of Ipê is crisscrossed by a vast quantity of uncataloged or small-sized streams and brooks. These small watercourses are crucial for maintaining the water table and feeding the larger rivers, acting as the backbone of the drainage system of the Atlantic Forest present in the municipality.

=== Environmental Issues ===
The Leão River is the main focus of local environmental concern, as it receives the discharge of untreated sanitary effluents, resulting in the compromise of its water quality. Although the pollution problem is frequently reported in the area of the neighboring municipality of Antônio Prado, the contribution of effluents originating from the territory of Ipê is a factor in the river's degradation, which indicates the absence or insufficiency of basic sanitation infrastructure in the catchment area.

=== Dialects ===
- Brazilian Portuguese
- Talian

== History ==
The history of the municipality of Ipê began in the late 19th century, around 1880, with the passage and resting of muleteers who, departing from the fields of Vacaria, headed through the Serra do Rio das Antas towards São Leopoldo. Until then, the ancient forests that covered the lands of Ipê remained almost untouched, with only indigenous people traversing the region, which was covered with vast pine groves from which they derived sustenance.

Gradually, the region began to be settled by farmers who cultivated corn and built various rudimentary houses, inhabited by Luso-Brazilians who were descendants of slaves from cattle ranches. These houses were made of beaten earth, split planks, and roofed with small boards.

Later, Italian immigrants, arriving from São Sebastião do Caí, would reach the region by boat, then travel on foot or horseback to settle in the Colony of Antônio Prado and the area that would become the Municipality of Ipê.

The Italian colonists who arrived in the area contributed to its prosperity. On December 31, 1890, the Municipal Chamber of Vacaria created the 4th District, which, due to the abundant presence of the beautiful Ipê tree, was named Vila Ipê.

As the community grew, ideas of emancipation began to surface. In 1985, the then parish priest of the São Luiz Rei Parish, Frei Augusto Denardi, initiated the formation of the Community Commission for Emancipation. On September 6, 1985, in a meeting held at the Ideal Club with local leaders and residents of Vila Ipê, Vila Segredo, and Vila São Paulo, respectively, the 4th, 9th, and 11th districts of Vacaria, the Emancipation Commission was chosen by acclamation, with the following members: Osmar Vargas dos Santos (President), Frei Casimiro Zaffonato (vice-president), Cirilo Ciotta (1st Secretary), Carlos Antonio Zanotto (2nd Secretary), Uldérico Marcon (1st Treasurer), Darci Luiz Lovatel (2nd Treasurer), Delvino Magro (Subcommission of Vila Segredo), and Luiz Antônio Salvador (Subcommission of Vila São Paulo).

On September 21, 1987, the result of the plebiscite proclaimed the victory of "YES," with 2,604 votes in favor and 465 against. On December 15, 1987, a law was promulgated by then-Governor Pedro Simon, which created the Municipality of Ipê, constituted by the districts of Vila Ipê, Vila Segredo, and Vila São Paulo, which previously belonged to the Municipality of Vacaria. The seat of the new municipality was established in Vila Ipê.

On January 1, 1989, the Municipality of Ipê was administratively installed, with Mr. Protázio Duarte Guazzelli serving as the first elected mayor.

The demonym for the residents of Ipê is "ipeense."

=== Administrative Formation ===
- The district of São Luiz de França was created by municipal act number 696 on December 31, 1890, under the jurisdiction of the Municipality of Vacaria.
- In 1938, the district was named Colônia São Luís de França.
- In 1938, the district was named Ipê.
- In the administrative divisions of 1960, 1983, 1993, and 2007, the district of Ipê remained under the jurisdiction of the Municipality of Vacaria.
- In 1987, Law 8,482 was promulgated, creating the Municipality of Ipê, separated from Vacaria. The municipality included the districts of Vila Ipê, Vila Segredo, and Vila São Paulo. The seat of the new municipality was located in Vila Ipê.
- The administrative installation of the Municipality of Ipê occurred on January 1, 1989.

=== Nomenclatures ===
Nomenclatures	Years
Formigueiro	1886
São Luiz	1890
Vila Ipê	1936
Ipê*	1987

1: Meaning "anthill", a derogatory name given by Italian immigrants to the cluster of farm workers' shacks.

== Education ==
Education Basic education in Ipê is structured and divided between the municipal and state networks. The municipal network is responsible for the majority of Early Childhood Education and Primary School I (first cycle of Elementary School), while the state network complements Elementary School and offers primarily High School.

In 2024, the municipality had 6 Elementary School establishments and 1 High School establishment. The teaching staff consisted of 74 teachers who served a total of 728 students in these stages. In 2022, the schooling rate for the age group of 6 to 14 years old was 96.84%.

Regarding the Basic Education Development Index (IDEB) in the public network, the 2023 results for Ipê were 6.1 for the Initial Years of Elementary School and 5.4 for the Final Years, placing the municipality in the 267th and 120th state positions, respectively.

The School Performance Rates, relative to the 2022 Census, demonstrate a high approval rate in Elementary School. In the initial years of this stage, the approval rate was 99.7%. In the final years, the approval rate was 98.4%. In High School, the approval rate was 88.2%, with a 10.5% failure rate and a 1.3% dropout rate.

== Leaders ==
Municipal mayor List
Nº	Name	Start of term	End of term	Observation
1	Protázio Duarte Guazzeli	1989	1992	
2	Enaudy Sartor	1993	1996	
3	Darci Zanotto	1997	2000	
4	Darci Zanotto	2001	2004	
5	Carlos Antônio Zanotto	2005	2008	
6	Carlos Antônio Zanotto	2000	2012	
7	Valerio Ernesto Marcon	2013	2016	
8	Valerio Ernesto Marcon	2017	2020	
9	Cassiano de Zorzi Caon	2021	*2023	Incomplete mandate
9.1	José Mário Grazziotin	2023	2024	Swearing-in of the Vice Mayor

a: Death of the Mayor in the Midst of the Term

== Subdivisions ==
District	Population
Ipê	3700
Vila São Paulo	800
Vila Segredo	1200

Vila São Paulo

Was established as a district on August 5, 1953, covering an area of 180 square kilometers. The landscape of this district is characterized by hilly terrain, with small and mini rural properties being predominant. Larger properties are rare, especially in the flat area known as the 'campo.' Approximately 95% of the population in Vila São Paulo is involved in agricultural and livestock activities, while 2% are engaged in commerce, 2% in industry, and 1% in the provision of services. In the headquarters of the 3rd District, which is Vila São Paulo, there are various commercial, service, and industrial establishments to serve the population.

Vila Segredo

Was established as a district on February 7, 1924, covering an area of 295 square kilometers. The region is characterized by its hilly terrain, primarily composed of small and mini rural properties. About 90% of the population in Vila Segredo is involved in agricultural and livestock activities, 2% in commerce, 3% in industry, and 5% in the provision of services. The main source of income for the district is the cultivation of apples and grapes, which are permanent crops well suited to the rugged topography of the region. Similar to Vila São Paulo, the headquarters of the 2nd District, which is Vila Segredo, has a variety of commercial, service, and industrial establishments.

== See also ==
- List of municipalities in Rio Grande do Sul
- Museu Histórico de Ipê
- Campos de Cima da Serra
- Igreja Matriz São Luiz Rei
