= Arroio das Caneleiras =

Coordinates: 31°33′S 52°32′W

The Arroio das Caneleiras is a watercourse which drains in the municipality of Pelotas, a town in the state of Rio Grande do Sul, Brazil. It rises in the municipality of Canguçu, and enters the territory of Pelotas from the North-West. When it joins with the Arroio do Quilombo, it becomes the Arroio Pelotas.
