= Machadinho Hydroelectric Power Plant =

Machadinho Dam
- Location within Brazil
- Official name: Machadinho Hydroelectric Power Plant
- Location: Machadinho, Santa Catarina/Rio Grande do Sul, Brazil
- Coordinates: 27°31′31″S 51°47′07″W
- Construction began: March 2, 1998
- Opening date: 2002
- Construction cost: $1.4 billion USD
- Owner: Machadinho Energetica

Dam and spillways
- Type of dam: Embankment, concrete face rock-fill
- Impounds: Pelotas River
- Height: 126 m (413 ft)
- Length: 700 m (2,300 ft)
- Spillway type: Service, controlled
- Spillway capacity: 35,703 m^{3}/s (1,260,800 cu ft/s)

Reservoir
- Creates: Itá Reservoir
- Total capacity: 3,300×10^{6} m^{3} (2,700,000 acre⋅ft)
- Catchment area: 32,500 km^{2} (12,500 sq mi)
- Surface area: 79 km^{2} (31 sq mi)

Power Station
- Commission date: 2002
- Type: Conventional
- Turbines: 3 x 380 MW (510,000 hp) Francis turbines
- Installed capacity: 1,140 MW (1,530,000 hp)
- Website; Machadinho Energetica

The Machadinho Hydroelectric Power Plant is a dam and hydroelectric power plant on the Pelotas River near Machadinho on the border of Santa Catarina and Rio Grande do Sul, Brazil. The power station has a 1,140 MW (1,530,000 hp) capacity and is supplied with water by a concrete face rock-fill embankment dam. It is owned and operated by Machadinho Energetica and produces the equivalent of 37% of the energy consumed in Santa Catarina.

== Background ==
Since 1966 and 1981, a series of studies were carried out on the Machadinho Dam and by 1982 a design was submitted and approved. The plant was slated to being commercial operations in 1993 but the project was delayed because of environmental concerns. The designers reevaluated the project and moved the dam's location further upstream on the river. After a new series of studies and new design were submitted, the project was approved in 1995. The design was prepared by Coyne et Bellier. Construction began on March 2, 1998 and by October 26, 1999, the river diversion was complete. By August 28, 2001, the dam was near completion and it began to impound the Pelotas River. On February 16, 2002, the first generator began to operate and by August 31, 2002 the dam was completed.

== Machadinho Dam ==
The Machadinho Dam is a 700-metre (2,300 ft) long and 126-metre (413 ft) high concrete face rock-fill embankment dam with a crest elevation of 480 metres (1,570 ft) above sea level. The dam's reservoir has a capacity of 3,300×10^{6} m^{3} (2,700,000 acre⋅ft), a surface area of 79 square kilometres (31 sq mi) and a catchment area of 32,500 square kilometres (12,500 sq mi). The dam supports a spillway with eight floodgates measuring 21.8 metres (72 ft) wide and 18 metres (59 ft) tall with maximum capacity of 35,703 cubic metres per second (1,260,800 cu ft/s).

== Power plant ==
The above ground power station is 130.2 metres (427 ft) long and 37.5 metres (123 ft) wide and contains three 136 ton, 380 megawatts (510,000 hp) generators powered by Francis turbines. The first generator was commissioned February 16, 2002, the second on April 30 and the final on December 7 of that same year.

== See also ==
- List of power stations in Brazil
