= Ibirapuitã Chico River =

Coordinates: 30°16′40″S 55°40′30″W

Location
- Country: Brazil

Physical characteristics
- Source
  - location: Rio Grande do Sul state

The Ibirapuitã Chico River is a river of Rio Grande do Sul state in southern Brazil. It is a tributary of the Ibirapuitã River.

== See also ==
- List of rivers of Rio Grande do Sul
