= Guaporé River (Rio Grande do Sul) =

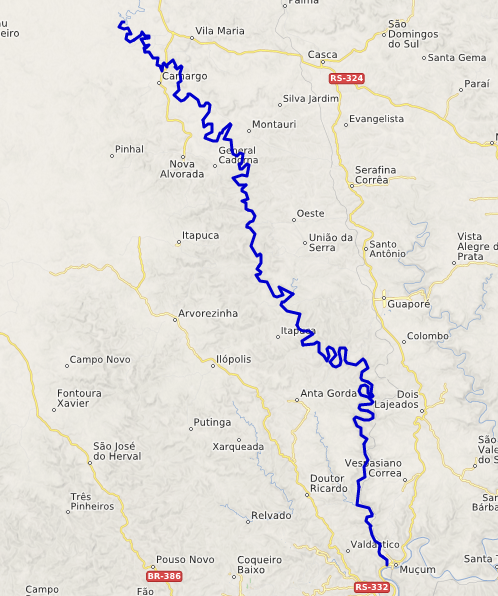

Location
- Country: Brazil

Physical characteristics
- Source
  - location: Rio Grande do Sul state
- Mouth: Taquari River
  - coordinates: 29°10′S 51°53′W

The Guaporé River is a river of Rio Grande do Sul state in southern Brazil.

== See also ==
- List of rivers of Rio Grande do Sul
