= Carreiro =

Carreiro may refer to:

== People ==
- Carreiro (footballer), João Baptista Siqueira Lima, Brazilian football midfielder
- Dylan Carreiro (born 1995), Canadian soccer player
- Júnior Carreiro (born 1991), Brazilian footballer

== Other ==
- Carreiro River (Rio Carreiro), a river in the state of Santa Catarina, Brazil
