= Azul River (Rio Grande do Sul) =

Location
- Country: Brazil

Physical characteristics
- Source
  - location: Rio Grande do Sul state
- Mouth: Palomas River
  - coordinates: 27°25′S 52°25′W

The Azul River is a river in Rio Grande do Sul in southern Brazil. It is a right tributary of the Palomas River. The name is shared by multiple rivers, including one in Argentina, another that flows through southern Brazil's Paraná state and is a tributary of the Piquiri River. Yet another river by the same name, in western Brazil's Acre state, is a tributary of the Môa River.

== See also ==
- List of rivers of Rio Grande do Sul
