= Dos Touros River =

Location
- Country: Brazil

Physical characteristics
- Source
  - location: Rio Grande do Sul state
- Mouth: Pelotas River
  - coordinates: 28°25′S 50°30′W

The Dos Touros River is a river of Rio Grande do Sul state in southern Brazil. Astyanax taurorum is a species of fish found in the river.

== See also ==
- List of rivers of Rio Grande do Sul
