= Dos Caixões River =

Location
- Country: Brazil

Physical characteristics
- Source
  - location: Rio Grande do Sul state
- Mouth: Jacuizinho River
  - coordinates: 29°11′S 53°4′W

The Dos Caixões River is a river of Rio Grande do Sul state in southern Brazil. It is a tributary of the Jacuizinho River.

== See also ==
- List of rivers of Rio Grande do Sul
