= São Domingos River (Rio Grande do Sul) =

Location
- Country: Brazil

Physical characteristics
- Source
  - location: Rio Grande do Sul state
- Mouth: Carreiro River
  - coordinates: 28°35′S 51°51′W

The São Domingos River is a river of Rio Grande do Sul state in southern Brazil.

== See also ==
- List of rivers of Rio Grande do Sul
