= Paranhana River =

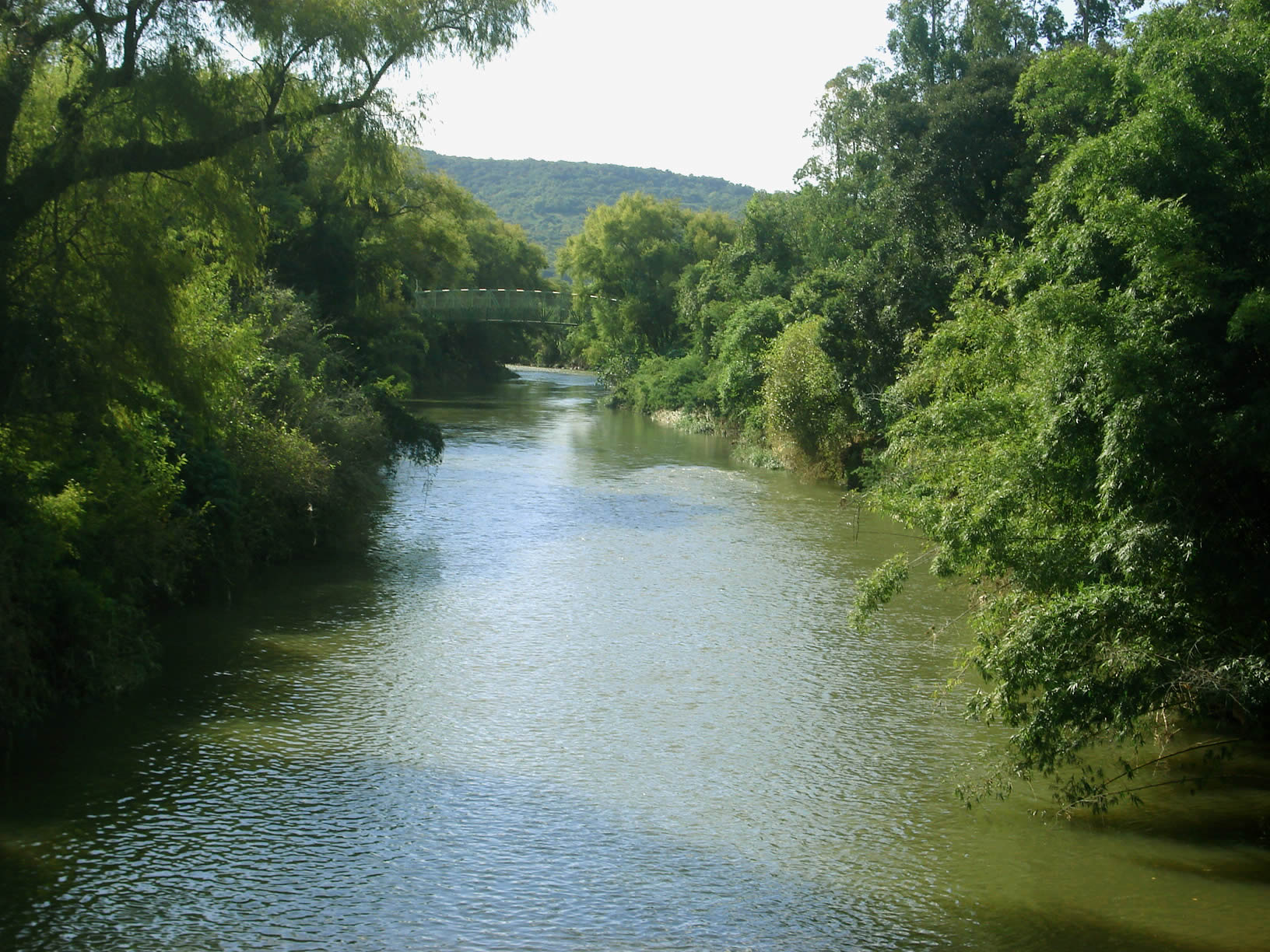

Location
- Country: Brazil

Physical characteristics
- Source
  - location: Rio Grande do Sul state
- Mouth: Rio dos Sinos
  - coordinates: 29°41′S 50°49′W

The Paranhana River is a river of Rio Grande do Sul state in southern Brazil.

== See also ==
- List of rivers of Rio Grande do Sul
