= Tomé River =

Brazilian river

Location
- Country: Brazil

Physical characteristics
- Source
  - location: Rio Grande do Sul state
- Mouth: Das Antas River
  - coordinates: 28°48′S 50°47′W

The Tomé River is a river of Rio Grande do Sul state in southern Brazil.

== See also ==
- List of rivers of Rio Grande do Sul
