= Inhandava River =

Inhandava River Forquilha River

Location
- Country: Brazil

Physical characteristics
- Source
  - location: Rio Grande do Sul state
- Mouth: Guarita River
  - coordinates: 27°31′S 51°49′W

The Inhandava or Inhanduva River, also known as the Forquilha River, is a river of Rio Grande do Sul state in southern Brazil.

== See also ==
- List of rivers of Rio Grande do Sul
