= Quebra-Dentes River =

Coordinates: 28°47′25″S 50°57′30″W

Location
- Country: Brazil

Physical characteristics
- Source
  - location: Rio Grande do Sul state

The Quebra-Dentes River is a river of Rio Grande do Sul state in southern Brazil.

== See also ==
- List of rivers of Rio Grande do Sul
