= Comandaí River =

Location
- Country: Brazil

Physical characteristics
- Source
  - location: Rio Grande do Sul state
- Mouth: Uruguay River
  - coordinates: 27°51′S 55°3′W

The Comandaí River is a river located in the Rio Grande do Sul state in southern Brazil.

== See also ==
- List of rivers of Rio Grande do Sul
