= Ibirubá River =

River in Rio Grande do Sul state, Brazil

Location
- Country: Brazil

Physical characteristics
- Source
  - location: Rio Grande do Sul state
- Mouth: Jacuí River
  - coordinates: 28°46′S 53°2′W

The Ibirubá River is a river of Rio Grande do Sul state in southern Brazil.

== See also ==
- List of rivers of Rio Grande do Sul
