= Jacuí-Mirim River =

Location
- Country: Brazil

Physical characteristics
- Source
  - location: Rio Grande do Sul state
- Mouth: Jacuí River
  - coordinates: 28°51′S 53°7′W

The Jacuí-Mirim River is a river of Rio Grande do Sul state in southern Brazil.

== See also ==
- List of rivers of Rio Grande do Sul
