= Do Meio River (Rio Grande do Sul) =

Location
- Country: Brazil

Physical characteristics
- Source
  - location: Rio Grande do Sul state
- Mouth: Uruguay River
  - coordinates: 28°26′S 55°42′W

The Do Meio River is a river of Rio Grande do Sul state in southern Brazil. It is a tributary of the Uruguay River.

== See also ==
- List of rivers of Rio Grande do Sul
