= Pardo River (Rio Grande do Sul) =

Coordinates: 29.9942°S 52.3822°W

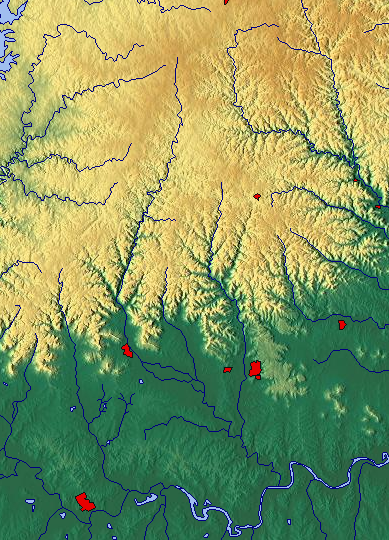

Location
- Country: Brazil

Physical characteristics
- Source
  - location: Rio Grande do Sul state

The Pardo River is a river of Rio Grande do Sul state in southern Brazil.

== See also ==
- List of rivers of Rio Grande do Sul
