= Tramandaí River =

River in Rio Grande do Sul, Brazil

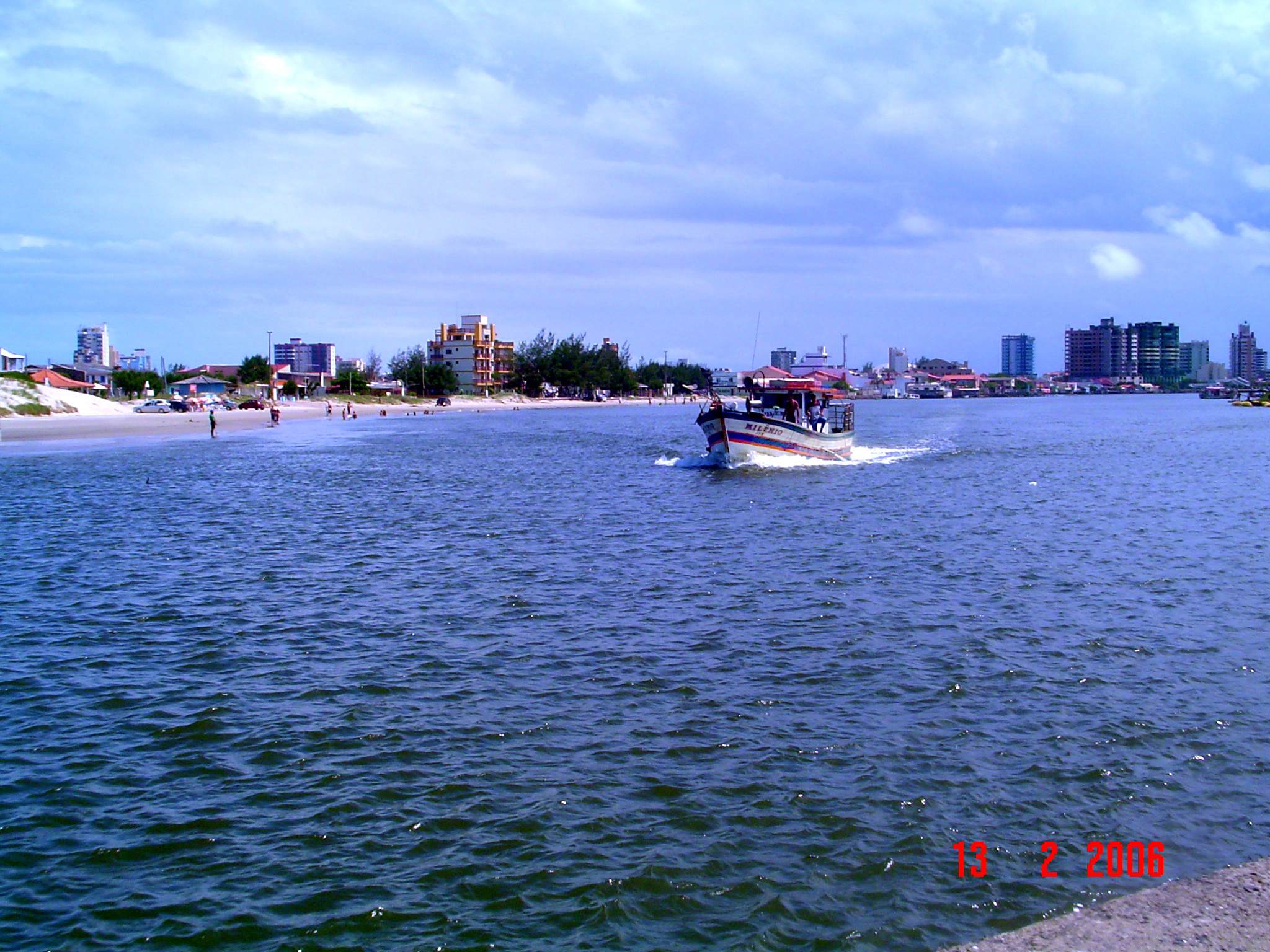

Location
- Country: Brazil

Physical characteristics
- Source
  - location: Rio Grande do Sul state
- Mouth: Atlantic Ocean
  - coordinates: 29°59′S 50°7′W

The Tramandaí River is a river of Rio Grande do Sul state in southern Brazil.

== See also ==
- List of rivers of Rio Grande do Sul
