= Jaguari River (Ibicuí River tributary) =

River in Rio Grande do Sul, Brazil

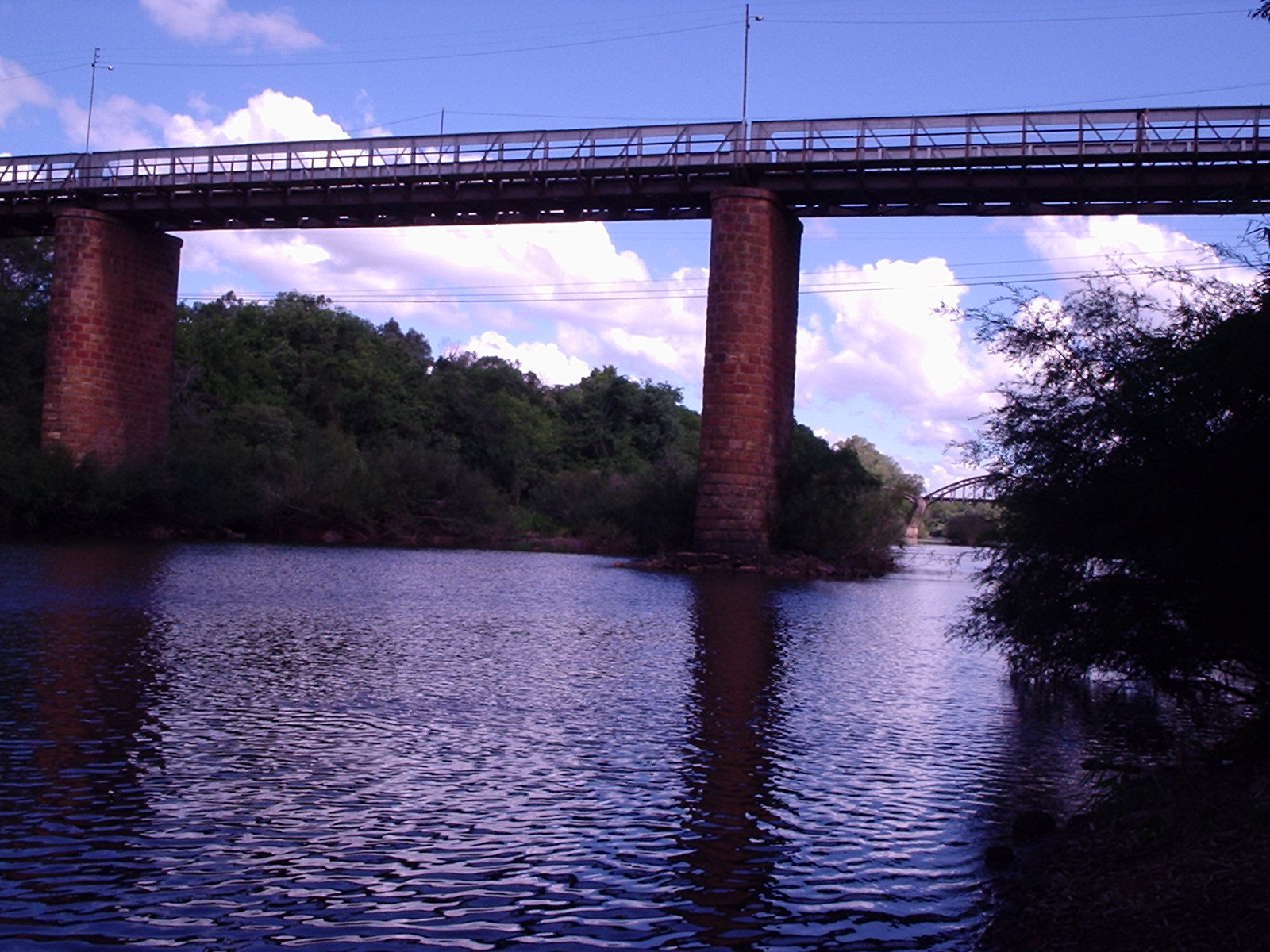
- Jaguari River in Rio Grande do Sul
- Native name: Rio Jaguari (Portuguese)

Location
- Country: Brazil

Physical characteristics
- Source
  - location: Rio Grande do Sul, Brazil
- Mouth: Ibicuí River
  - location: Rio Grande do Sul, Brazil
  - coordinates: 29°41′41″S 55°07′52″W

The Jaguari River (Portuguese: Rio Jaguari) is a river of the Rio Grande do Sul state in southern Brazil. It is a tributary of the Ibicuí River, which in turn is a tributary of the Uruguay River.

== See also ==
- List of rivers of Rio Grande do Sul
