= Toropi River =

Location
- Country: Brazil

Physical characteristics
- Source
  - location: Rio Grande do Sul state
- Mouth: Ibicuí River
  - coordinates: 29°45′S 54°30′W

The Toropi River is a river of Rio Grande do Sul state in southern Brazil. It merges with the Ibicuí-Mirim River to form the Ibicuí.

== See also ==
- List of rivers of Rio Grande do Sul
