= Ibirapuitã River =

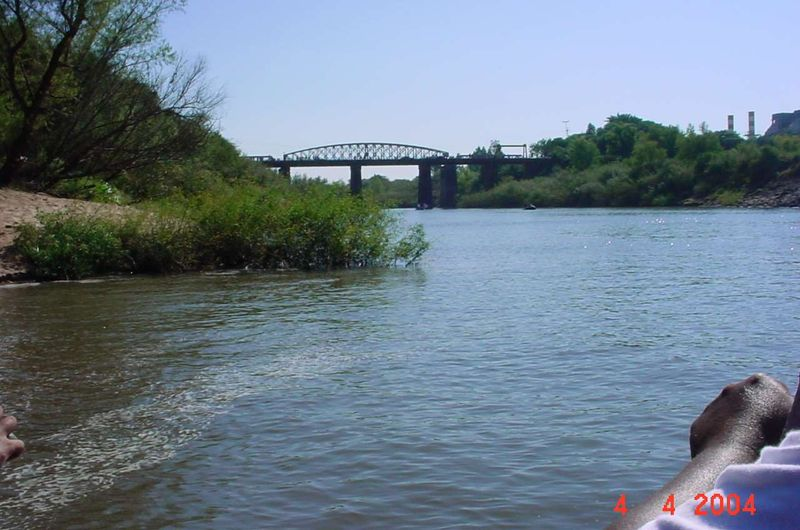

Location
- Country: Brazil

Physical characteristics
- Source
  - location: Rio Grande do Sul state
- Mouth: Ibicuí River
  - coordinates: 29°22′S 55°57′W

The Ibirapuitã River is a river of Rio Grande do Sul state in southern Brazil.

== See also ==
- List of rivers of Rio Grande do Sul
