= Caá-Iari River =

Coordinates: 27°24′S 54°13′W

Location
- Country: Brazil

Physical characteristics
- Source
  - location: Rio Grande do Sul state

The Caá-Iari River is a river of Rio Grande do Sul state in southern Brazil.

== See also ==
- List of rivers of Rio Grande do Sul
