= Dourado River (Rio Grande do Sul) =

Location
- Country: Brazil

Physical characteristics
- Source
  - location: Rio Grande do Sul state
- Mouth: Uruguay River
  - coordinates: 27°19′S 52°14′W

The Dourado River is a river of Rio Grande do Sul state in southern Brazil.

== See also ==
- List of rivers of Rio Grande do Sul
