= Ijuizinho River =

Coordinates: 28°20′59″S 54°22′10″W

Location
- Country: Brazil

Physical characteristics
- Source
  - location: Rio Grande do Sul state

The Ijuizinho River is a river of Rio Grande do Sul state in southern Brazil.

== See also ==
- List of rivers of Rio Grande do Sul
