= Apuaê River =

Location
- Country: Brazil

Physical characteristics
- Source
  - location: Rio Grande do Sul state
- Mouth: Uruguay River
  - coordinates: 27°32′S 51°51′W

The Apuaê River is a river of Rio Grande do Sul state in southern Brazil. It is one of the main courses that make up the Apuaê-Inhandava river basin. Its source is formed by the confluence with the Peixe River.

== See also ==
- List of rivers of Rio Grande do Sul
