= Santa Maria River (Rio Grande do Sul) =

Coordinates: 29°48′13″S 54°55′20″W

Location
- Country: Brazil

Physical characteristics
- Source
  - location: Rio Grande do Sul state
- Mouth
  - location: Ibicuí River

The Santa Maria River (Portuguese, Rio Santa Maria) is a river of Rio Grande do Sul state in southern Brazil. It joins the Ibicuí-Mirim River to form the Ibicuí River.

== See also ==
- List of rivers of Rio Grande do Sul
