= Ibicuí da Cruz River =

Coordinates: 30°34′S 55°07′W

Location
- Country: Brazil

Physical characteristics
- Source
  - location: Rio Grande do Sul state

The Ibicuí da Cruz River is a river of Rio Grande do Sul state in southern Brazil.

== See also ==
- List of rivers of Rio Grande do Sul
