= Icamaquã River =

Coordinates: 28°34′2″S 56°0′13″W

Location
- Country: Brazil

Physical characteristics
- Source
  - location: Rio Grande do Sul state
- Mouth
  - location: Uruguay River
- Length: 250 km (160 mi)
- Basin size: 5,044 km^{2} (1,947 sq mi)

The Icamaquã River (Portuguese, Rio Icamaquã) is a river of Rio Grande do Sul state in southern Brazil. It is a tributary of the Uruguay River.

== See also ==
- List of rivers of Rio Grande do Sul
