= Turvo River (Rio Grande do Sul) =

Turvo River Rio Turvo (Portuguese)
- Location within Brazil

Location
- Country: Brazil

Physical characteristics
- Source
  - location: Rio Grande do Sul state
- Mouth
  - coordinates: 27.264843°S 54.052666°W

Basin features
- River system: Uruguay River

The Turvo River (Portuguese: Rio Turvo) is a river of Rio Grande do Sul state in southern Brazil. It is a tributary of the Uruguay River.

The Turvo River defines the western boundary of the 17,491 hectares (43,220 acres) Turvo State Park, created in 1947.

== See also ==
- List of rivers of Rio Grande do Sul
