= Ivaí River (Rio Grande do Sul) =

Location
- Country: Brazil

Physical characteristics
- Source
  - location: Rio Grande do Sul state
- Mouth: Jacuí River
  - coordinates: 29°8′S 53°16′W

The Ivaí River (Rio Grande do Sul) is a river of Rio Grande do Sul state in southern Brazil.

== Aquatic Wildlife ==
The Ivaí River basin has a wide variety of wildlife residing therein, especially fish. Over 100 species have been documented, originating from the basin itself, from neighboring bodies of water, and "exotic" fish from entirely disconnected regions.

== See also ==
- List of rivers of Rio Grande do Sul
