= Machadinho =

Municipality in Rio Grande do Sul, Brazil

Coordinates: 27°34′S 51°40′W

- Municipality
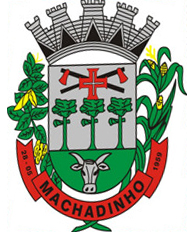
- Flag Coat of arms
- Interactive map of Machadinho
- Country: Brazil
- Time zone: UTC−3 (BRT)

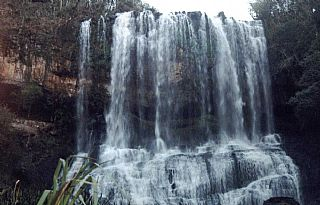

Machadinho is a municipality in the state of Rio Grande do Sul, Brazil. It was raised to municipality status in 1959, the area being taken out of the municipality of Lagoa Vermelha. As of 2020, the estimated population was 5,427.

== See also ==
- List of municipalities in Rio Grande do Sul
