= Santa Rosa River (Rio Grande do Sul) =

Coordinates: 27°33′28″S 54°39′57″W

Location
- Country: Brazil

Physical characteristics
- Source
  - location: Rio Grande do Sul state
- Mouth
  - location: Uruguay River

The Santa Rosa River (Portuguese, Rio Santa Rosa) is a river of Rio Grande do Sul state in southern Brazil. It is a tributary of the Uruguay River.

== See also ==
- List of rivers of Rio Grande do Sul
