= Arroio Pelotas =

Coordinates: 31°46′S 52°17′W

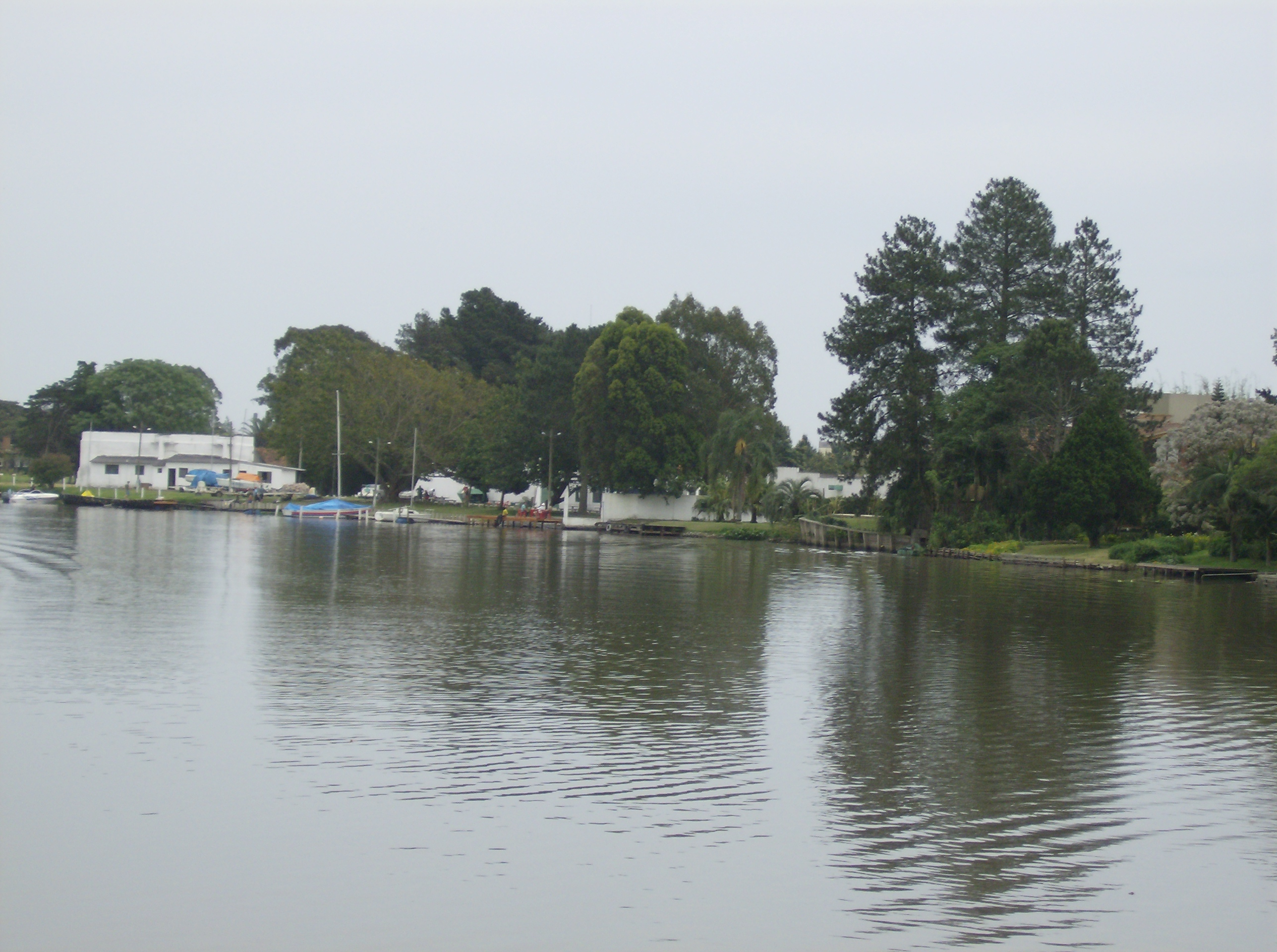

Location
- Country: Brazil

Physical characteristics
- Source
  - location: Rio Grande do Sul state

The Arroio Pelotas is a river of Rio Grande do Sul state in southern Brazil.

== See also ==
- List of rivers of Rio Grande do Sul
