= Palomas River =

Location
- Country: Brazil

Physical characteristics
- Source
  - location: Rio Grande do Sul state
- Mouth: Uruguay River
  - coordinates: 27°17′S 52°25′W

The Palomas River is a river of Rio Grande do Sul state in southern Brazil. It is a tributary of the Uruguay River, which forms parts of the boundaries of Brazil, Argentina, and Uruguay.

== See also ==
- List of rivers of Rio Grande do Sul
