= Leão River (Rio Grande do Sul) =

Location
- Country: Brazil
- State: Rio Grande do Sul

Physical characteristics
- Source
  - location: Ipê
  - elevation: 1,200 m (3,900 ft)
- Mouth: Das Antas River
  - coordinates: 28°55′29″S 51°16′39″W
  - elevation: 100 m (330 ft)

Basin features
- Cities: Ipê Antônio Prado

The Leão River (Portuguese: Rio Leão) is a river of Rio Grande do Sul state in southern Brazil. The Leão River flows from Ipê, passes through Antônio Prado, and empties into the Das Antas River.

== See also ==
- List of rivers of Rio Grande do Sul
