= Passo Fundo River =

Coordinates: 27°17′8″S 52°41′26″W

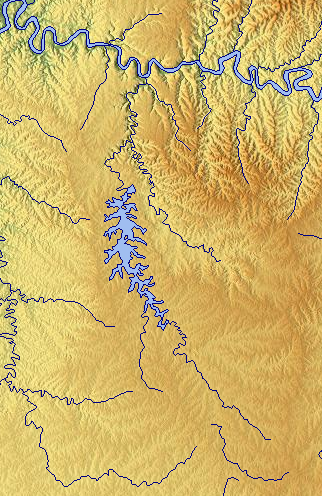

Location
- Country: Brazil

Physical characteristics
- Source
  - location: Rio Grande do Sul state
- Mouth
  - location: Uruguay River

The Passo Fundo River (Portuguese, Rio Passo Fundo) is a river of Rio Grande do Sul state in southern Brazil. It is a tributary of the Uruguay River.

== See also ==
- List of rivers of Rio Grande do Sul
- Tributaries of the Río de la Plata
