= Rio da Várzea =

Coordinates: 27°12′48″S 53°19′33″W

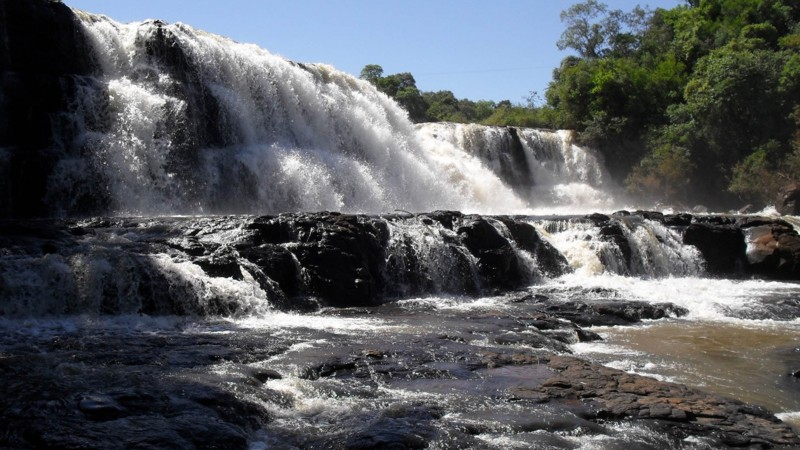
- Rio da Várzea

Location
- Country: Brazil

Physical characteristics
- Source
  - location: Rio Grande do Sul state
- Mouth
  - location: Uruguay River

The Rio da Várzea is a river of Rio Grande do Sul state in southern Brazil. It is a tributary of the Uruguay River.

== See also ==
- List of rivers of Rio Grande do Sul
- Tributaries of the Río de la Plata
