= Triunfo, Rio Grande do Sul =

Municipality of Rio Grande do Sul, Brazil

Triunfo
- Municipality
- Municipality of Triunfo
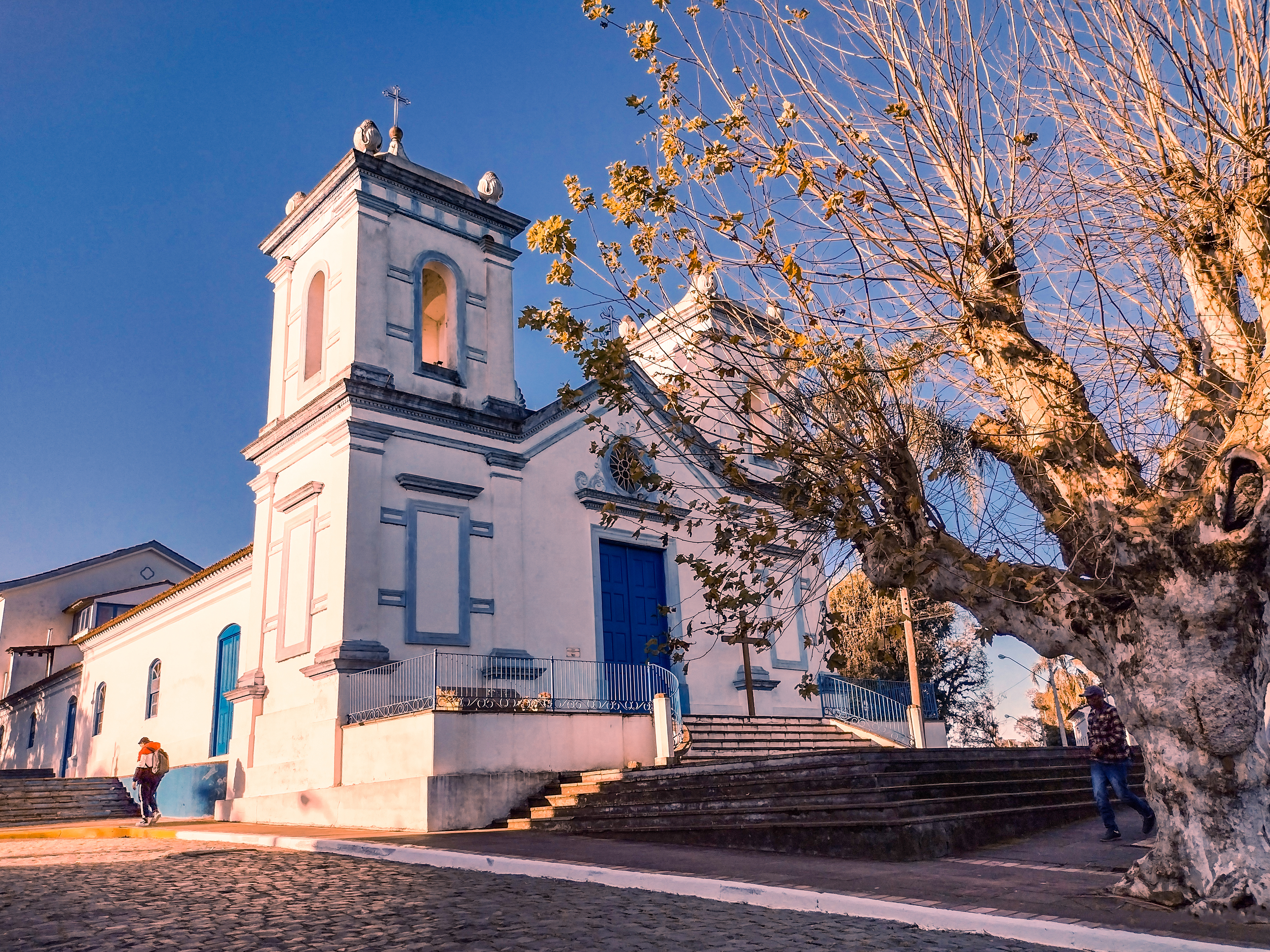
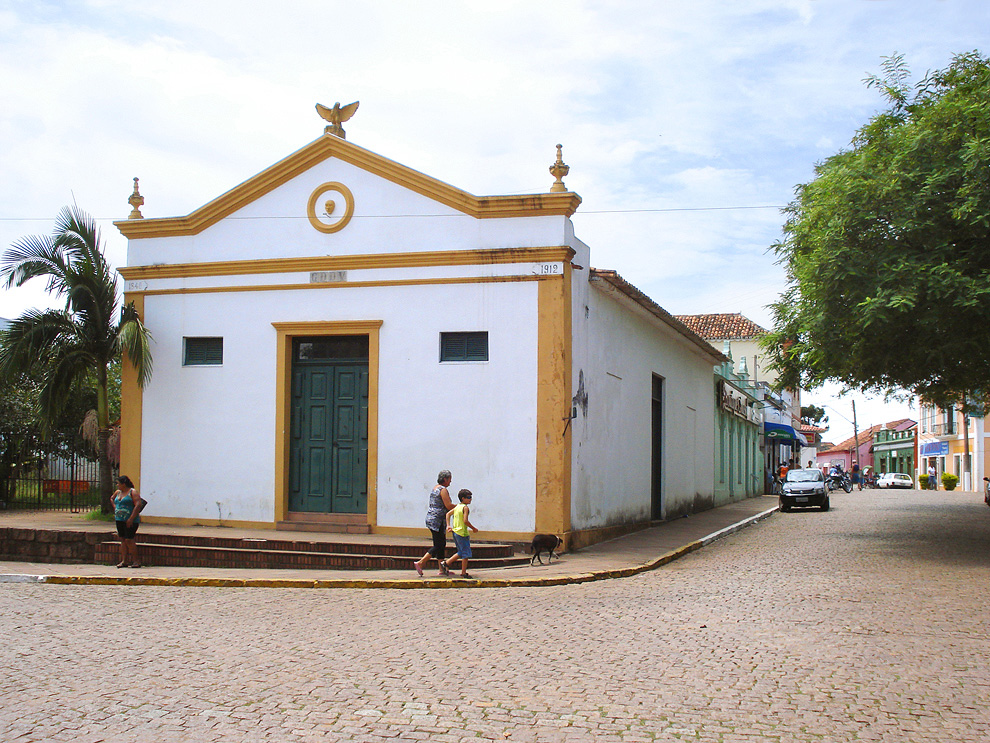
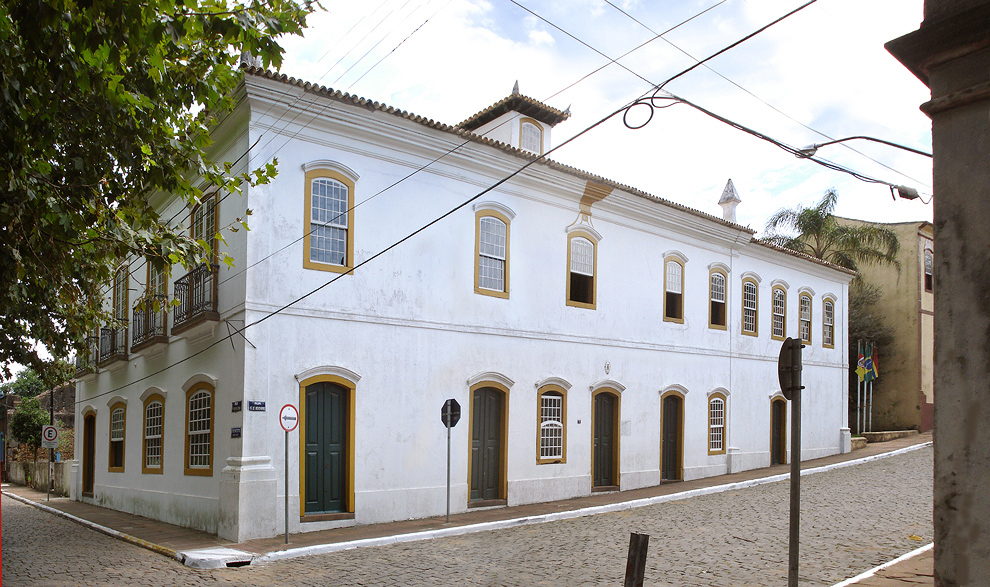
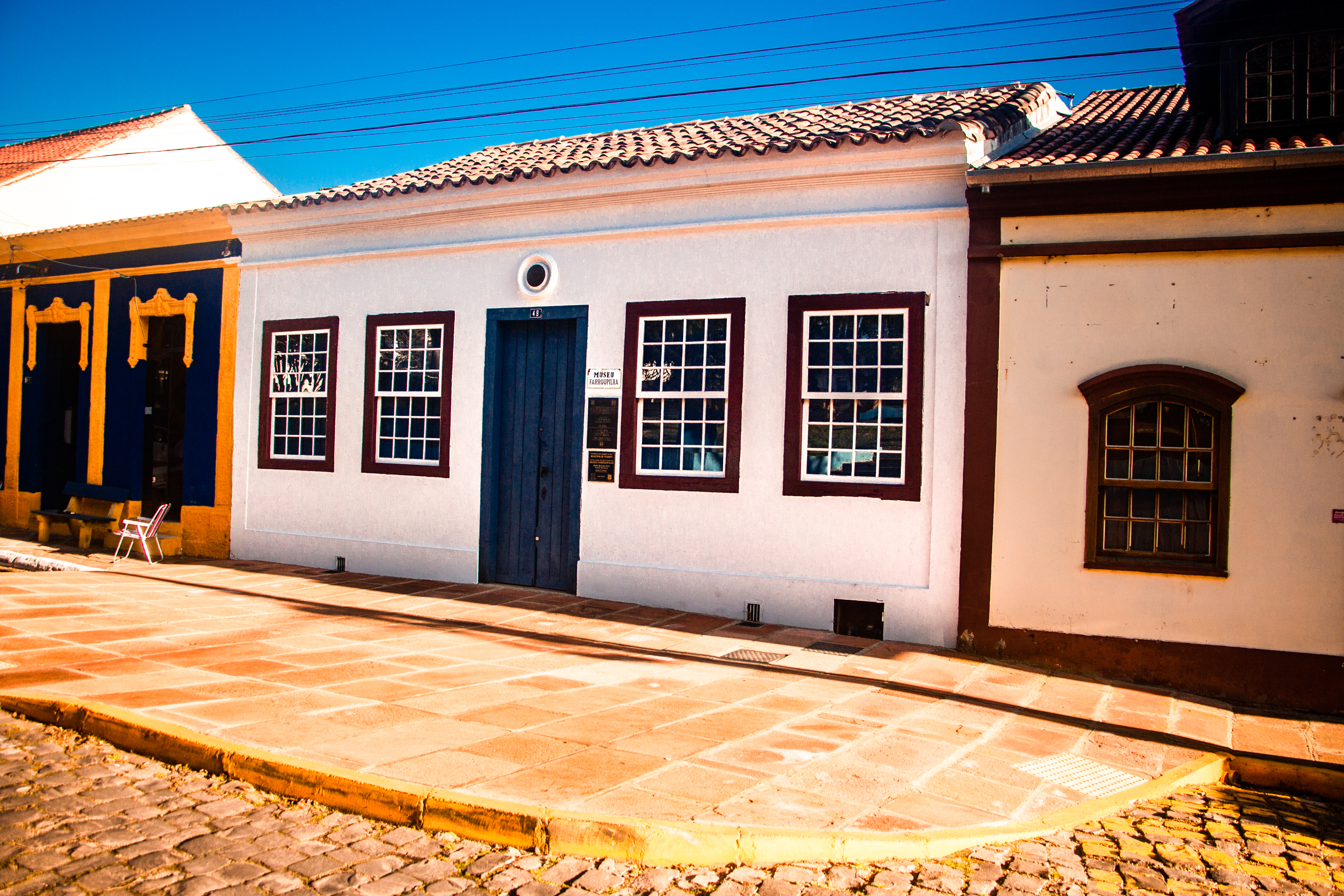
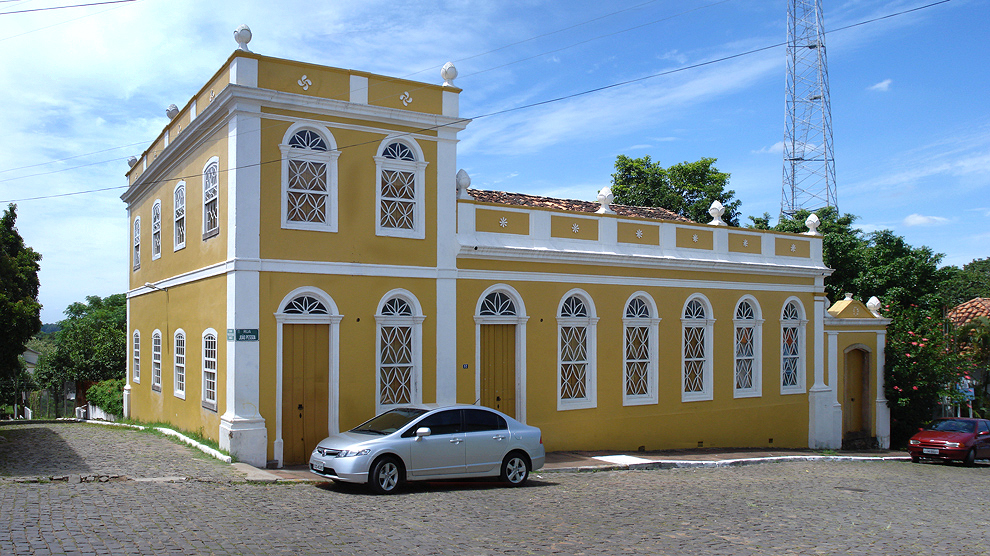
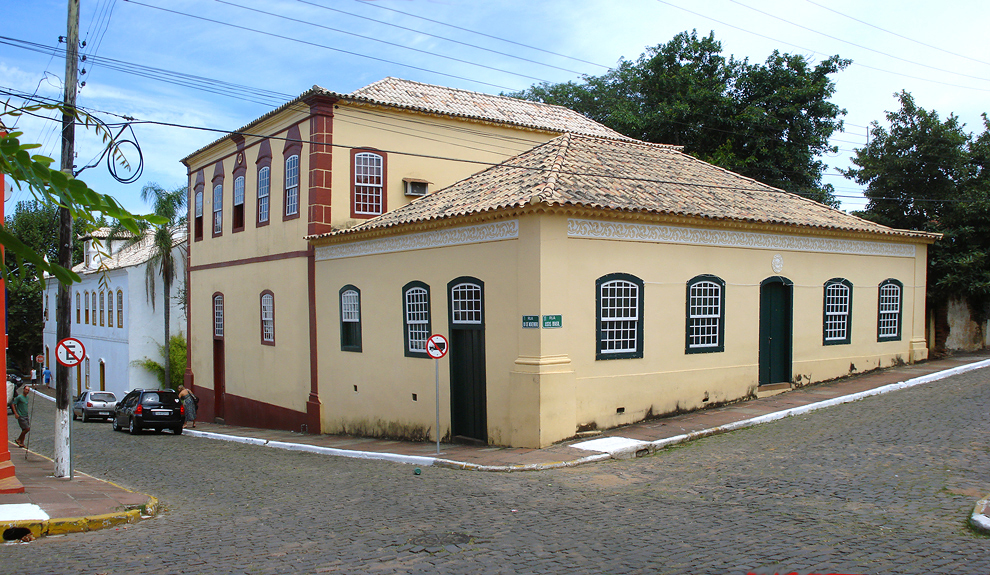

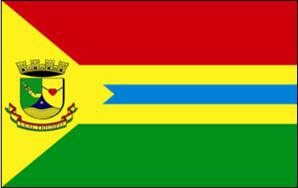
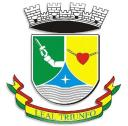
- Flag Coat of arms

- Location in Rio Grande do Sul

- Location in Brazil
- Coordinates: 29°56′34″S 51°43′04″W
- Country: Brazil
- Region: South
- State: Rio Grande do Sul

Area
  - Total: 818.80 km^{2} (316.14 sq mi)

Population (2020)
  - Total: 29,856
  - Density: 36.463/km^{2} (94.439/sq mi)
- Time zone: UTC−3 (BRT)
- HDI (2010): 0.733 – high

Triunfo is a municipality in the state of Rio Grande do Sul, Brazil. The population is 29,856 (2020 est.) in an area of 818.80 km². It is situated at the confluence of the rivers Taquari and Jacuí. It is the richest municipality in Brazil, with a per capita income of R$122,750 (US$65,275).

== Geography ==
=== Climate ===
Climate data for Triunfo, Rio Grande do Sul (1981–2010)
Month	Jan	Feb	Mar	Apr	May	Jun	Jul	Aug	Sep	Oct	Nov	Dec	Year
Mean daily maximum °C (°F)	30.9 (87.6)	30.4 (86.7)	29.5 (85.1)	26.3 (79.3)	22.4 (72.3)	19.9 (67.8)	19.6 (67.3)	21.4 (70.5)	22.5 (72.5)	25.3 (77.5)	27.8 (82.0)	30.2 (86.4)	25.5 (77.9)
Daily mean °C (°F)	24.6 (76.3)	24.1 (75.4)	23.1 (73.6)	20.1 (68.2)	16.6 (61.9)	14.4 (57.9)	14.0 (57.2)	15.4 (59.7)	16.7 (62.1)	19.3 (66.7)	21.5 (70.7)	23.5 (74.3)	19.4 (66.9)
Mean daily minimum °C (°F)	19.6 (67.3)	19.3 (66.7)	18.5 (65.3)	15.6 (60.1)	12.3 (54.1)	10.3 (50.5)	9.5 (49.1)	10.8 (51.4)	12.0 (53.6)	14.4 (57.9)	16.2 (61.2)	18.2 (64.8)	14.7 (58.5)
Average rainfall mm (inches)	114.1 (4.49)	112.7 (4.44)	103.1 (4.06)	104.6 (4.12)	109.1 (4.30)	145.5 (5.73)	147.7 (5.81)	125.8 (4.95)	154.9 (6.10)	152.2 (5.99)	120.3 (4.74)	117.3 (4.62)	1,507.3 (59.34)
Average precipitation days (≥ 1.0 mm)	9	9	7	8	8	9	9	9	10	9	8	9	104
Average relative humidity (%)	79.1	81.2	82.0	83.9	85.3	86.6	84.9	84.0	83.3	80.7	78.7	77.6	82.3
Source: Instituto Nacional de Meteorologia

== See also ==
- List of municipalities in Rio Grande do Sul
