= Vacacaí River =

Location
- Country: Brazil

Physical characteristics
- Source
  - location: Rio Grande do Sul state
  - coordinates: 30°44′S 54°10′W
- Mouth: Jacuí River
  - coordinates: 29°56′S 53°5′W

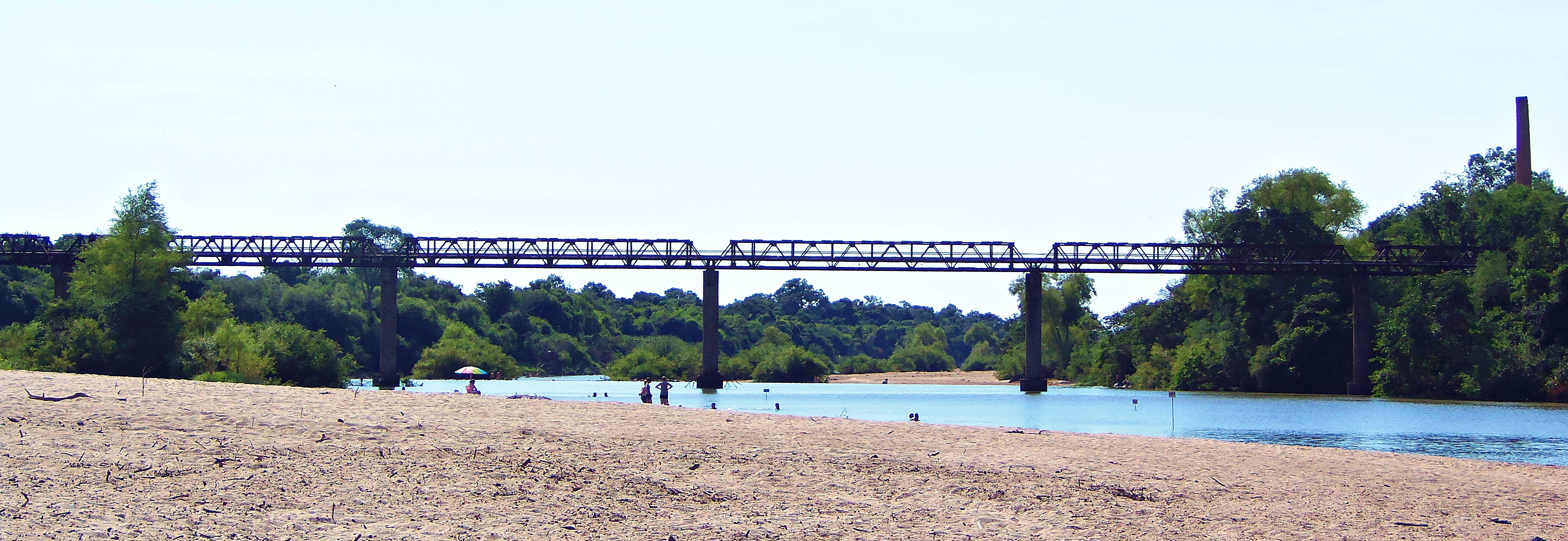
Bridge over the River Vacacai

The Vacacaí River (Portuguese pronunciation: [vakakaˈi]) is a river of Rio Grande do Sul state in southern Brazil.

== See also ==
- List of rivers of Rio Grande do Sul
