= Carreiro River =

Location
- Country: Brazil

Physical characteristics
- Source
  - location: Rio Grande do Sul state
- Mouth: Taquari River
  - coordinates: 29°5′S 51°43′W

Rio Carreiro is a river in the state of Rio Grande do Sul in Brazil. The source of the river is between the municipalities of Ibiraiaras and Lagoa Vermelha, whence it flows generally south until it joins the Das Antas River to form the Taquari, near São Valentim do Sul.
