= Rio dos Sinos =

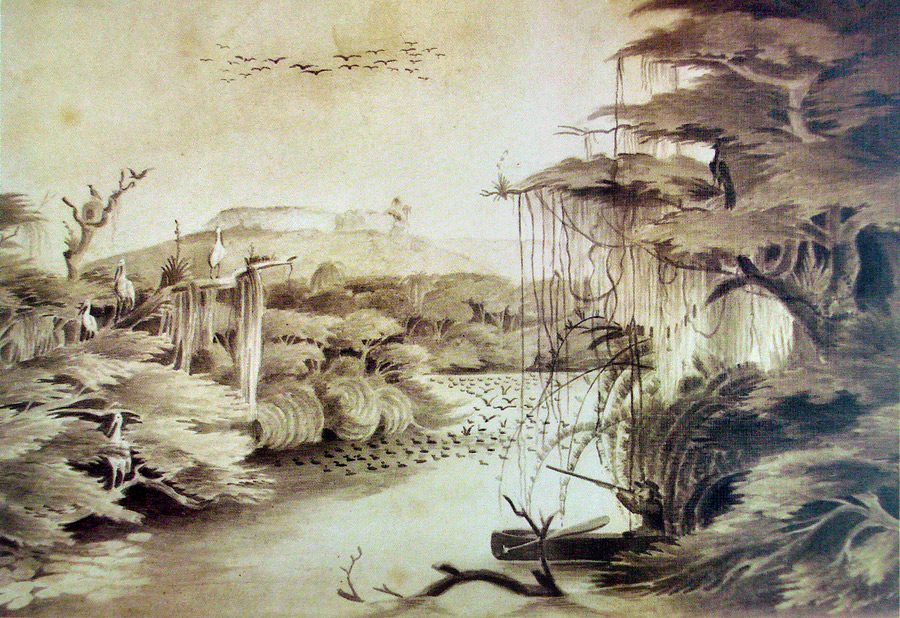
- Rio dos Sinos by Herrmann Wendroth, c. 1852

- Location within Brazil

Location
- Country: Brazil

Physical characteristics
- Source
  - location: Rio Grande do Sul state
  - elevation: 695 m (2,280 ft)
- Mouth
  - location: Canoas
  - coordinates: 29.934444°S 51.235833°W
  - elevation: 5 m (16 ft)
- Length: 190 km (120 mi)
- Basin size: 3,820 km^{2} (1,470 sq mi)

Rio dos Sinos is a river in the state of Rio Grande do Sul, southern Brazil. It rises in the hills east of Caraá (130 kilometres (81 mi) away from Porto Alegre) at elevations above 600 metres (2,000 ft) and covers a distance of about 190 kilometres (120 mi), flowing into the delta Jacuí in Canoas, at an elevation of only 5 metres (16 ft).

The river basin contains the São Francisco de Paula National Forest, a 1,616-hectare (3,990-acre) sustainable use conservation area created in 1968.

== See also ==
- List of rivers of Rio Grande do Sul
