= Ijuí River =

Coordinates: 27°58′3″S 55°20′1″W

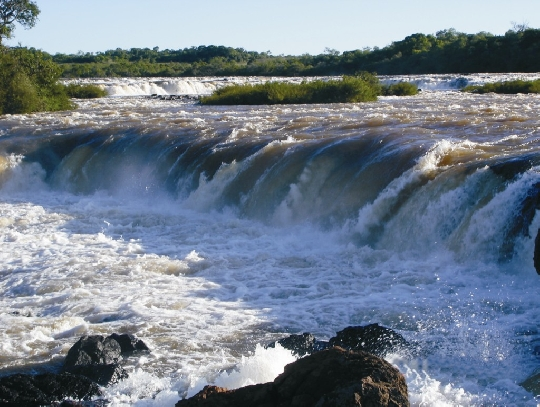

Location
- Country: Brazil

Physical characteristics
- Source
  - location: Rio Grande do Sul state
- Mouth
  - location: Uruguay River
- Length: 541.7 km (336.6 mi)
- Basin size: 10,724 km^{2} (4,141 sq mi)

The Ijuí River (Portuguese, Rio Ijuí) (Portuguese pronunciation: [ʁiw iʒuˈi]) is a river of Rio Grande do Sul state in southern Brazil. It is a tributary of the Uruguay River.

The name Ijuí (the earlier spelling Ijuhy is to be found in older documents and maps), like many geographical names and names of topographical features in Brazil, originated from the Guarani language.

== See also ==
- List of rivers of Rio Grande do Sul
- Cerro do Inhacurutum
