= Gravataí River =

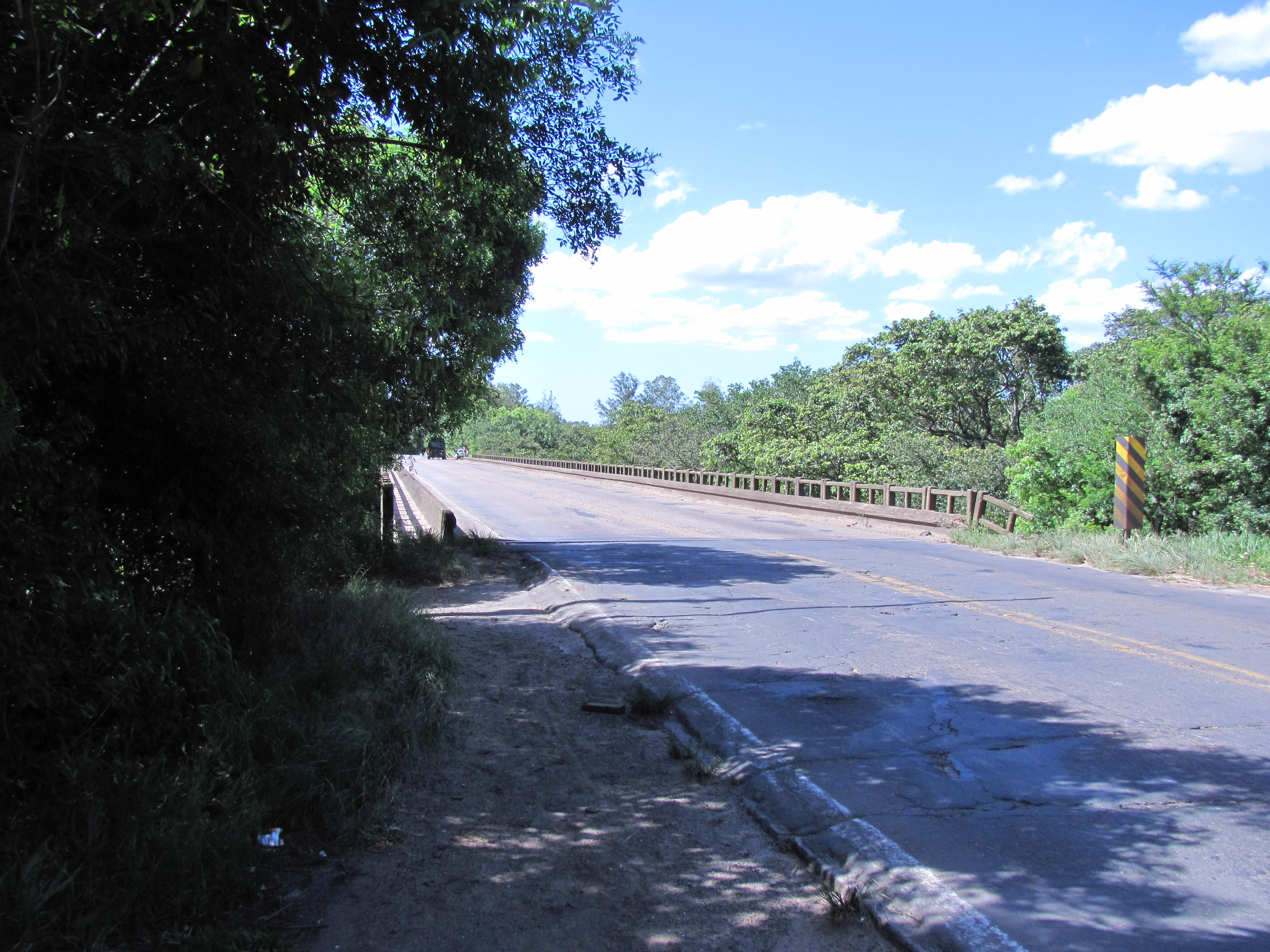

Location
- Country: Brazil

Physical characteristics
- Source
  - location: Rio Grande do Sul state
- Mouth: Guaíba River
  - coordinates: 29°58′S 51°12′W

Gravataí River (Portuguese pronunciation: [ɡɾavataˈi]) is a river that runs along Gravataí (a city located in the metropolitan area of Porto Alegre city).
