= Da Prata River (Rio Grande do Sul) =

Location
- Country: Brazil

Physical characteristics
- Source
  - location: Rio Grande do Sul state
- Mouth: Das Antas River
  - coordinates: 29°1′S 51°29′W

The Da Prata River is a river of Rio Grande do Sul state in southern Brazil. It is a tributary of the Das Antas River.

== See also ==
- List of rivers of Rio Grande do Sul
