= Ibicuí River =

River in Brazil

Coordinates: 29°25′16″S 56°46′20″W

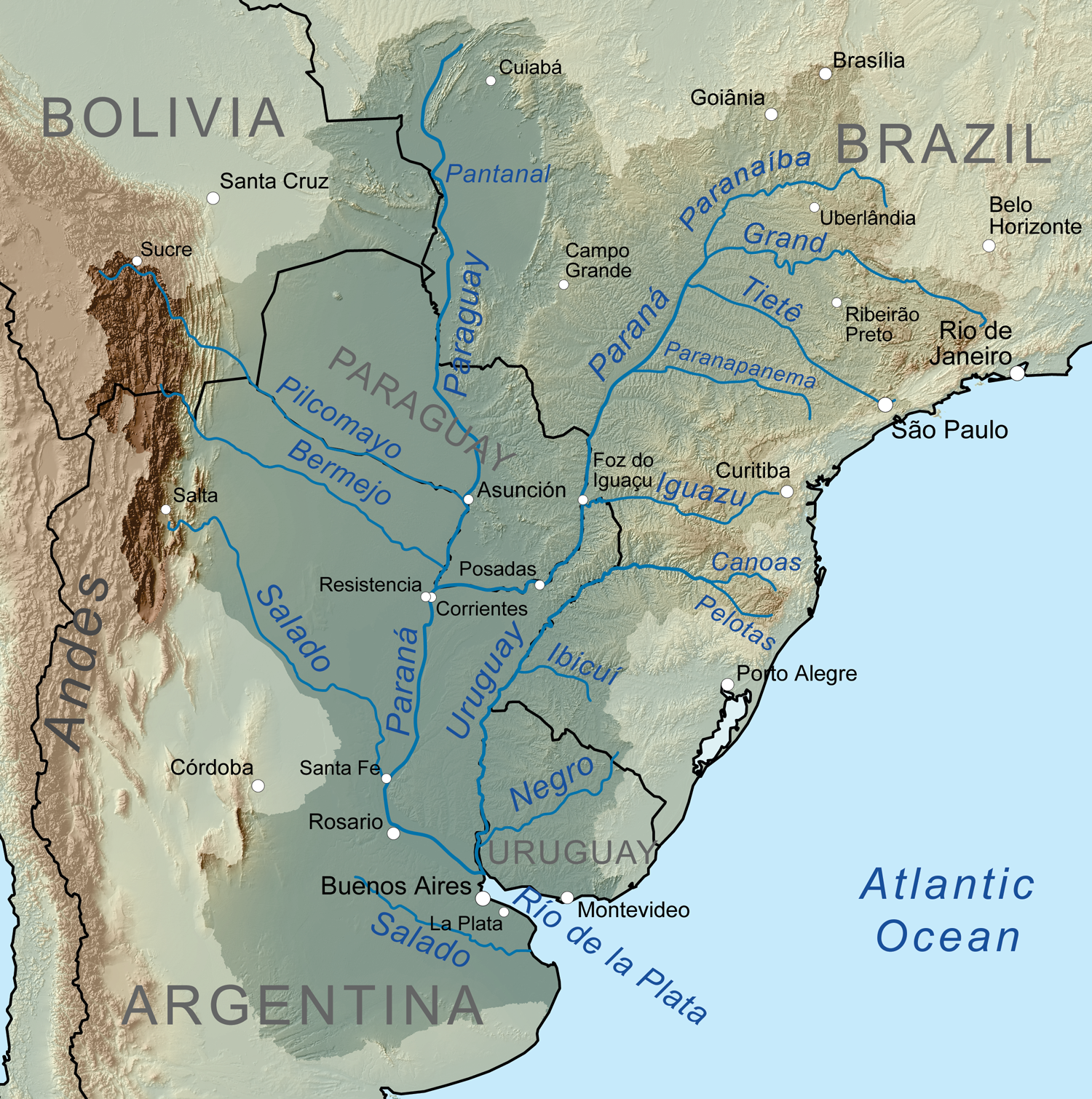
Map of the Rio de la Plata Basin, showing the Ibicuí River joining the Uruguay River.

The Ibicuí River (Portuguese, Rio Ibicuí) (Portuguese pronunciation: [ibikuˈi]) is a river in Rio Grande do Sul state of southern Brazil. The Ibicuí is 290 km in length, and is the main tributary of the Uruguay River. It is formed by the confluence of the Ibicuí-Mirim River and Santa Maria River at the city of Cacequi. The Ibicuí divides the cities of Uruguaiana and Itaqui.

The river's name, Ibicuí, means "ground of sand" in the Tupi language.

== See also ==
- List of rivers of Rio Grande do Sul
