= Humatã River =

Humatã River Turvo River

Location
- Country: Brazil

Physical characteristics
- Source
  - location: Rio Grande do Sul state
- Mouth: Da Prata River
  - coordinates: 28°53′S 51°28′W

The Humatã River, also known as the Turvo River, is a river of Rio Grande do Sul state in southern Brazil. It is a tributary of the Da Prata River.

== See also ==
- List of rivers of Rio Grande do Sul
