= Taquari River (Rio Grande do Sul) =

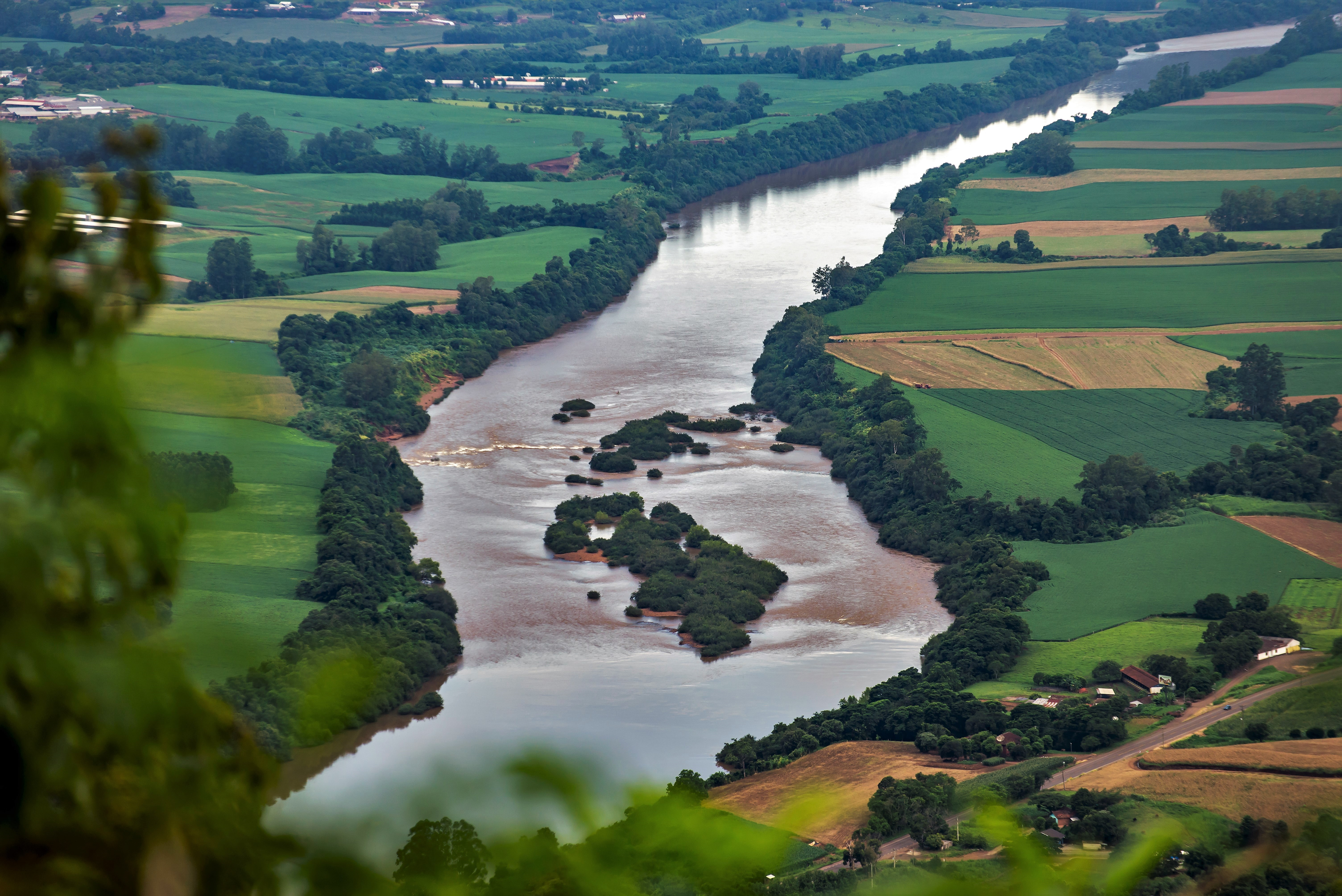

Location
- Country: Brazil

Physical characteristics
- Source
  - location: Rio Grande do Sul state
- Mouth
  - location: Jacuí River
  - coordinates: 29.9469°S 51.7265°W

The Taquari River (Portuguese: Rio Taquari) is a river of Rio Grande do Sul state in southern Brazil. It is a left tributary of the Jacuí River, into which it flows at Triunfo. In its upper course, it is called Rio das Antas.

== See also ==
- List of rivers of Rio Grande do Sul
