= Ituim River =

Coordinates: 28°38′21″S 51°23′54″W

Location
- Country: Brazil

Physical characteristics
- Source
  - location: Rio Grande do Sul state

The Ituim River, popularly known as the Saltinho River, is a river of Rio Grande do Sul state in southern Brazil.

== See also ==
- List of rivers of Rio Grande do Sul
