= Pelotas River =

River in southern Brazil

Coordinates: 27°36′31″S 51°27′22″W

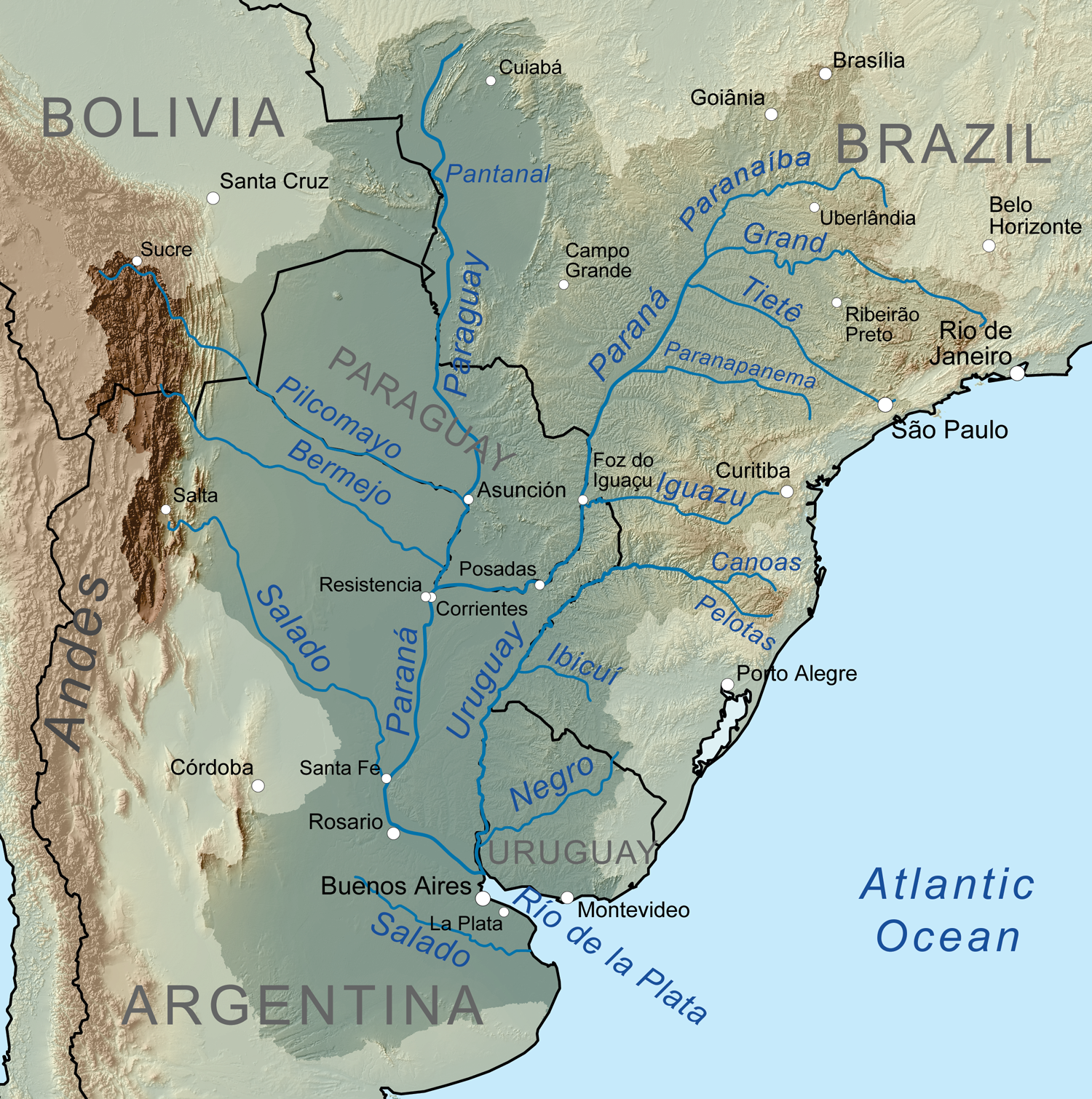
Map of the La Plata Basin, showing the Pelotas River joining the Canoas River to form the Uruguay River.

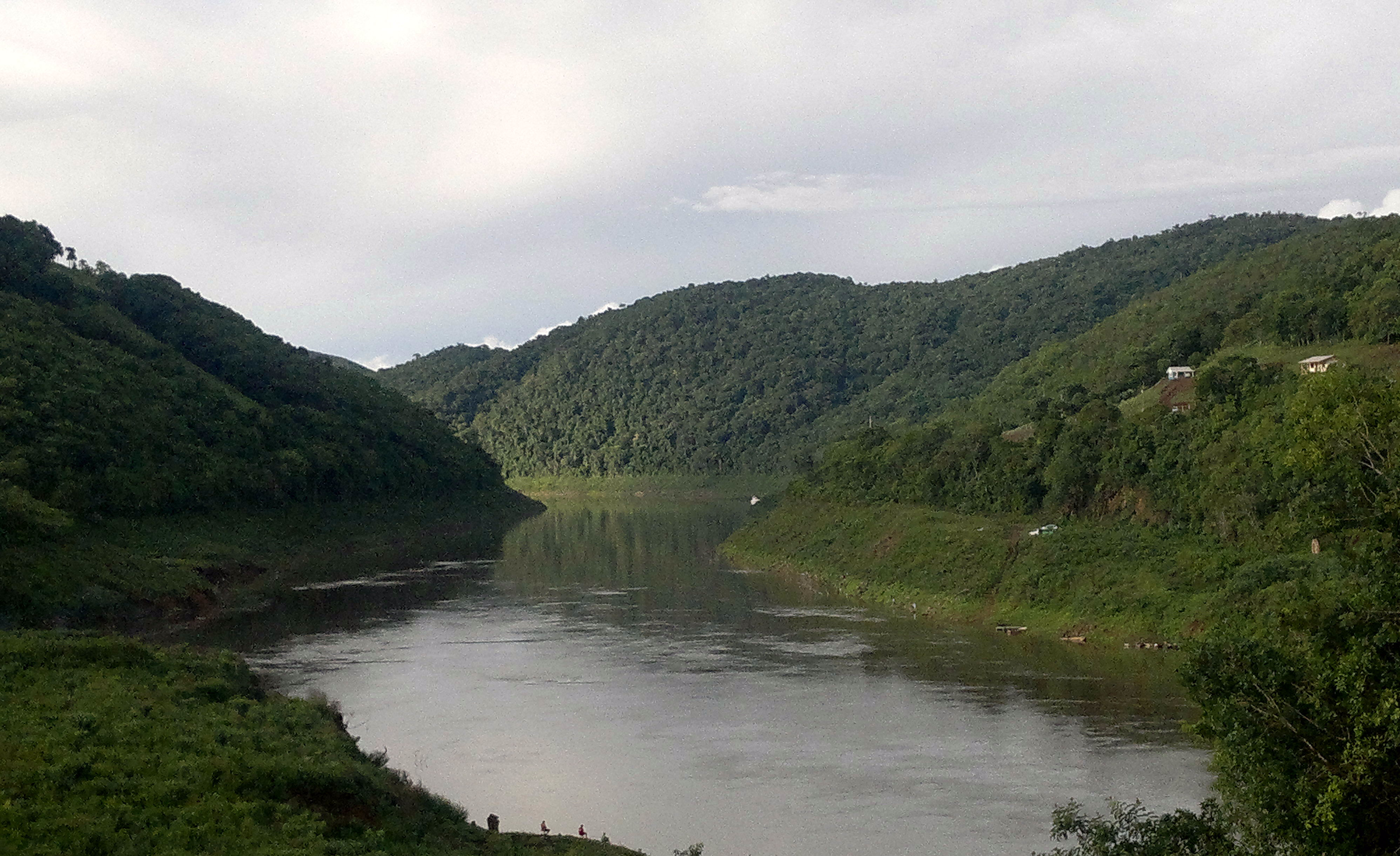
Near Vacaria

The Pelotas River (Portuguese: Rio Pelotas [ˈʁi.u peˈlɔtɐs]) is a river in southern Brazil, and a tributary of the Uruguay River.

The river originates in the Serra Geral at Alto do Bispo and flows northeast for 450 kilometres (280 mi) before meeting the Canoas River, forming the Uruguay River. It forms the border between Rio Grande do Sul and Santa Catarina states.

The river is dammed by the Machadinho and Barra Grande Dams.

== See also ==
- List of rivers of Santa Catarina
