= Das Antas River (Rio Grande do Sul) =

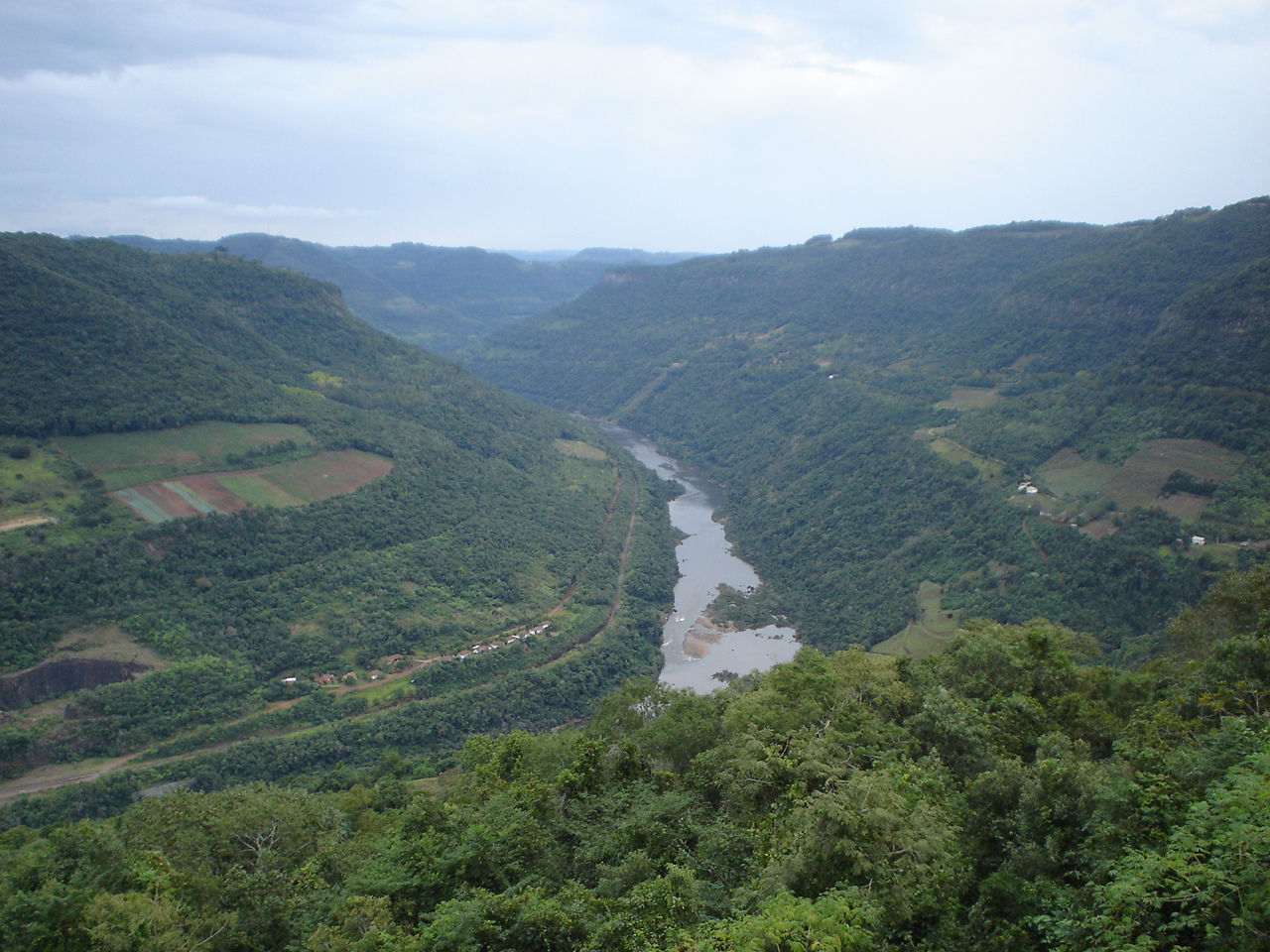

Location
- Country: Brazil

Physical characteristics
- Source
  - location: Aparados da Serra National Park
  - elevation: 1,200 m (3,900 ft)
- Mouth: Taquari River
  - coordinates: 29°5′S 51°43′W
  - elevation: 100 m (330 ft)
- Length: 390 km (240 mi)

The Das Antas River (Portuguese: Rio das Antas) is a river of Rio Grande do Sul state in southern Brazil. Below its junction with the Carreiro it forms the Taquari River.

== See also ==
- List of rivers of Rio Grande do Sul
