= Caí River =

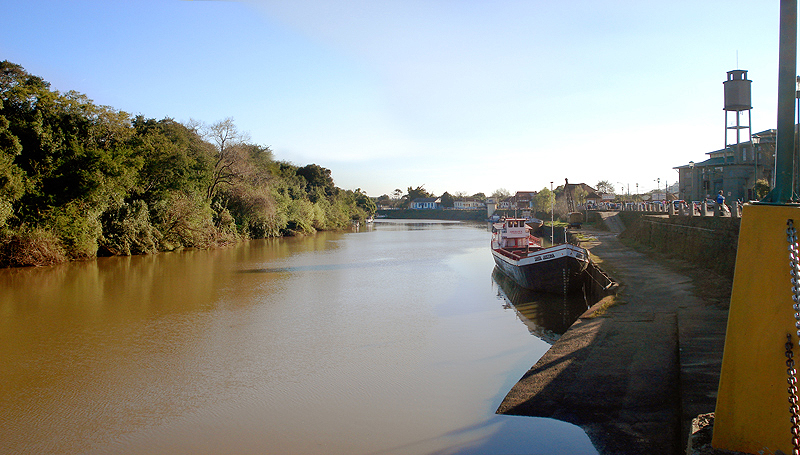

Location
- Country: Brazil

Physical characteristics
- Source
  - location: Rio Grande do Sul state
- Mouth: Jacuí River
  - coordinates: 29°56′S 51°16′W

The Caí River (Portuguese pronunciation: [kaˈi]) is a river of Rio Grande do Sul state in southern Brazil. It is a tributary of the Jacuí River, just above the junction with the Guaíba.

== See also ==
- List of rivers of Rio Grande do Sul
