= National Route 14 (Argentina) =

Highway in Argentina

National Route 14
- Ruta nacional 14

Route information
- Length: 1,127 km (700 mi)

Major junctions
- South end: Ceibas (33°29′59.8″S 58°48′2.3″W)
- RN 12 in Ceibas, RN 136 in Gualeguaychú, RP 39 in Concepción del Uruguay, RN 135 in Colón, RN 130 in San José, RN 18 and RN A015 near Concordia, RN 119 and RN 127 at the "paraje Cuatro Bocas", RN 117 near Paso de los Libres, RN 122 near Yapeyú, RN 121 in Santo Tomé, RN 120 near Gobernador Virasoro, RN 105 in San José and RN 101 in Bernardo de Irigoyen
- North end: Bernardo de Irigoyen (26°15′17.1″S 53°38′39.2″W)

Location
- Country: Argentina

Highway system
- Highways in Argentina

The Ruta Nacional 14 General José Gervasio Artigas (Decree Law 26859/10 jun 2013) is a major road in Argentina. It starts in the small city of Ceibas, in the Entre Ríos province. Route 14 diverges from Ruta Nacional 12, following the río Uruguay coast and ending in the city of Bernardo de Irigoyen, Misiones. It is one of the busiest roads of the country, mainly because of tourists going to Brazil and Uruguay, and because it receives most of the former's trade.

The road is being widened between Gualeguaychú and Paso de los Libres. Almost the entire route is fully paved, except for the Gramado (near San Pedro) and Dos Hermanas stretch, which is due to be paved in February 2011. The road's length is 1,127 km.

Lately, this road has gained a bad reputation due to frequent traffic accidents, being colloquially dubbed "La Ruta de la Muerte" (The Road of Death).

This route passes by the El Palmar National Park, which is known for its Yatay Palm trees, whose entrance is 6 km south of Ubajay, in the Entre Ríos province. It also passes by the Parque Provincial Cruce Caballero northeast from the city of San Pedro in the Misiones province.

== Destinations ==
These are some of the cities with 5000 inhabitants or more that RN 14 passes by:

=== Entre Ríos Province ===
Stretch: 343 km (km 0 to 343)

- Ibicuy Islands: There are no cities with more than 5000 inhabitants.
- Gualeguaychú Department: access to Gualeguaychú by RP 16 (km 56), Urquiza street(km 59) and RP 20 (km 72).
- Uruguay Department: access to Concepción del Uruguay (km 125)
- Colón Department: access to Colón (RN 135) (km 151), San José (Km 156) and Villa Elisa (RN 130) (km 163)
- Concordia Department: access to Concordia (km 253)
- Federación Department: access to Federación (km 296) and Chajarí (km 329)

=== Corrientes Province ===
Stretch: 441 km (km 343 to 784)

- Monte Caseros Department: Mocoretá (km 345) and access to Monte Caseros by RP 129 (km 384)
- Curuzú Cuatiá Department: There are no cities with more than 5000 inhabitants.
- Paso de los Libres Department: access to Paso de los Libres by RN 117 (km 496)
- San Martín Department: There are no cities with more than 5000 inhabitants, but the road passes through La Cruz (km 592). At km 551 is the RN 122 junction from which people can gain access to the historic town of Yapeyú.
- General Alvear Department: Alvear (km 602)
- Santo Tomé Department: Santo Tomé (km 683) and Gobernador Virasoro (km 744)
- Ituzaingó Department: There are no cities with more than 5000 inhabitants.

=== Misiones Province ===
Stretch: 343 km (km 784 to 1127).

- Apóstoles Department: There are no cities with more than 5000 inhabitants.
- Capital: There are no cities with more than 5000 inhabitants.
- Leandro N. Alem Department: Leandro N. Alem (km 848)
- Oberá Department: Oberá (km 873) and Campo Viera (km 894)
- Cainguás Department: Campo Grande (km 914) and Aristóbulo del Valle (km 930)
- Guaraní Department: San Vicente (km 975)
- San Pedro Department: San Pedro (km 1048). The unpaved section is generally avoided using paved provincial routes 20 and 19 in the town of Dos Hermanas in the General Manuel Belgrano Department.
- General Manuel Belgrano Department: Bernardo de Irigoyen (km 1126)

=== Toll booths and services ===
References:

- km 5: Shell Gas Station (Ceibas)
- km 48: Shell Gas Station (Gualeguaychú)
- km 54: Posta Parador (Gualeguaychú)
- km 56: El Tagüe Hotel & Parador (Gualeguaychú)
- km 83: Gas Station
- km 100: Toll booth (Colonia Elía)
- km 100: Petrobras Gas station (Concepción del Uruguay)
- Km 124: ACA gas station (Colonia Elía)
- km 143: YPF Gas station (Colón)
- km 150: ACA gas station (Colón)
- km 151: Shell Gas Station (Colón)
- km 205: Parador Gastiazoro (Ubajay)
- km 240: Toll booth (Yeruá)
- km 248: YPF Gas station (Concordia)
- km 264: Restaurant "El Bagual"
- km 296: YPF Gas station (Federación)
- km 320: YPF Gas station (Chajarí)
- km 321: Esso Gas station (Chajarí)
- km 323: Estación de servicio Shell (Chajarí)
- km 363: Toll booth (Piedritas)
- km 406: YPF Gas station (Cuatro Bocas)
- km 469: Gas station (Bonpland)
- km 495: Gas station (San Joaquín)
- km 744: Shell Gas Station (Gobernador Virasoro)
- km 791: YPF Gas station (San José)
- km 848: YPF Gas station (Leandro N. Alem)
- km 877: Shell Gas Station (Oberá)
- km 975: Shell Gas Station (San Vicente)
- km 1126: YPF Gas station (Bernardo de Irigoyen)
