= 2022 Corrientes wildfires =

Wildfires in Corrientes Province, Argentina

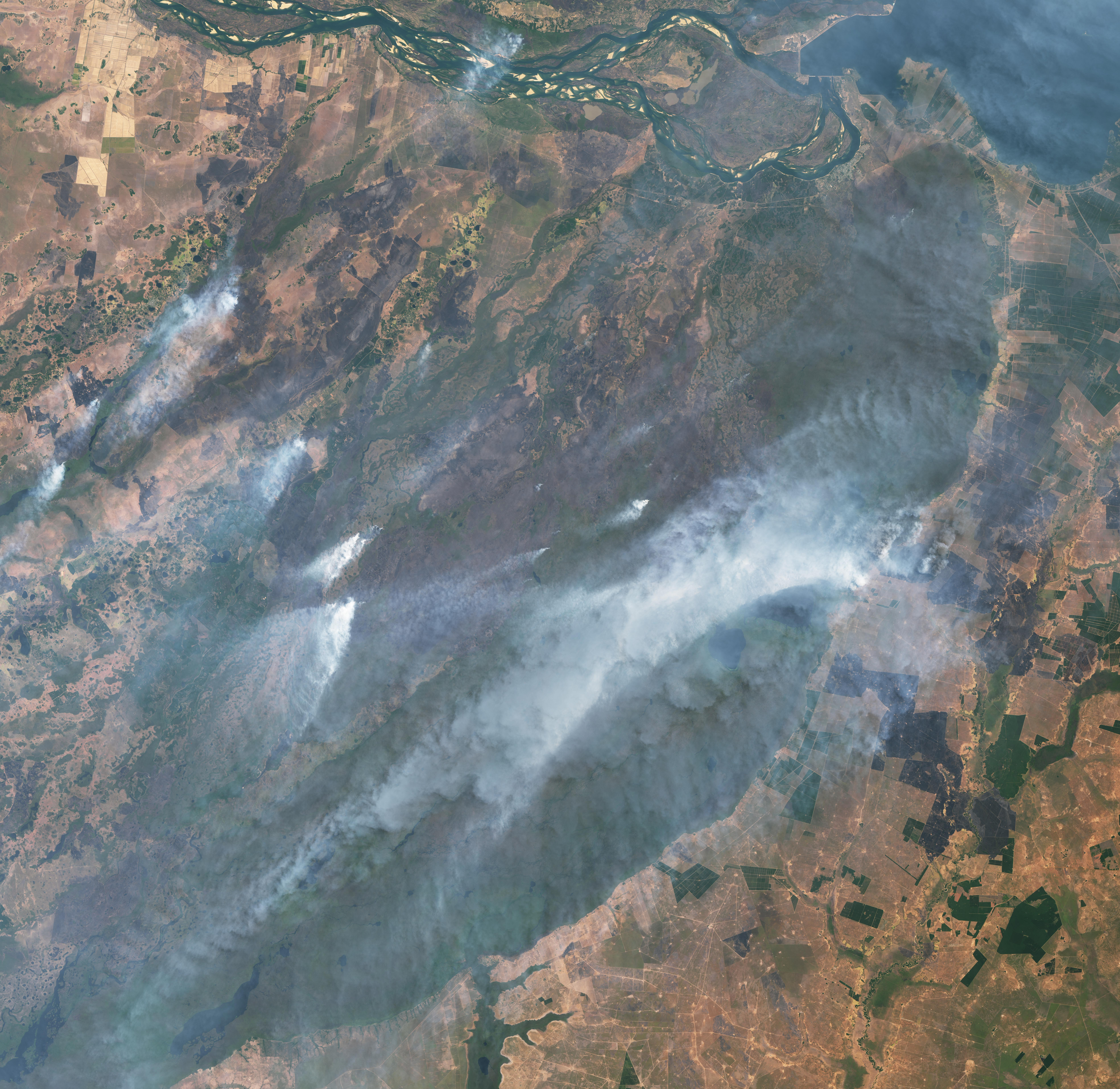

Statistics
- Total area: 800,000 hectares (2,000,000 acres)

The 2022 Corrientes wildfires were a series of wildfires burning throughout the Corrientes Province in Argentina. It began in January of that year and continued to be active in many parts of the province, having consumed more than 800,000 hectares, which is equivalent to approximately ten percent of the province. The fire advanced over fields, mountains, wetlands and nature reserves, including the Iberá Wetlands, and has caused material damage estimated at between 25 and 40 billion pesos.

The reasons for the fires include a natural disaster caused by high temperatures, water stress and lack of humidity in the environment, as well as man-made actions, either by starting intentional or negligent fires.

== Affected areas ==
The fires occurred throughout the province, identifying various different scopes and magnitude in the departments and municipalities of Concepción, San Miguel, Curuzú Cuatiá, Ituzaingó, Santo Tomé, Loreto, Gobernador Virasoro, Bella Vista, San Martín, General Paz, San Antonio de Itatí, Villa Olivari, Mercedes, Monte Caseros, San Luis del Palmar, Goya and Saladas. The advance of the fire even caused cuts in inter-jurisdictional circulation routes such as National Route 14 and Provincial Route 5, and generated interruptions in fiber optic internet connectivity in Caá Catí.

According to a survey carried out by the Natural Resources Group of INTA in Corrientes, the Ituzaingó Department has the largest area affected by the fires, exceeding 138,000 hectares burned. In turn, considered proportionally to the total surface, it is the San Miguel Department that presents the highest percentage of its affected surface, with more than 30%. Between 7 and 16 February, the rate of growth of the fire was 30,000 hectares per day, an area 33% larger than Buenos Aires.

== Response ==
Governor Gustavo Valdés issued Decree 200/22 declaring the entire province of Corrientes in a state of agricultural emergency and, later, the province was established as an ecological and environmental disaster zone. In this context, tax and credit benefits and the possibility of direct assistance for rural producers were provided. Valdés also said that Juan Cabandié, the nation's minister of environment and sustainable development, called him concerning about political positioning to complain about criticism made by Mauricio Macri.

More than 2,600 firefighters and brigade members were deployed throughout Corrientes. The provincial governments of Mendoza, Jujuy, Córdoba, Chaco, Buenos Aires, Misiones, Santiago del Estero, San Juan and Entre Ríos sent personnel and equipment, as did the national government and that of the City of Buenos Aires. The head of the Buenos Aires government, Horacio Rodríguez Larreta, and the Buenos Aires Minister of Security, Sergio Berni, personally attended the coastal province as part of the assistance provided by their districts.

At the international level, the president of Brazil, Jair Bolsonaro, announced that the federal government of the neighboring country would send firefighters to fight the flames. Similarly, the Bolivian government arranged a delegation of brigadistas to collaborate with the tasks of fighting against fire. For his part, Valdés announced that he had requested help from the United States government through its ambassador in Argentina, Marc Stanley. Different well-known personalities from the media called for solidarity donation campaigns such as influencer Santiago Maratea who, in less than 20 hours, raised more than 100 million pesos.

At the judicial level, although the existence of intentional fires was made known, few actions were initiated and, in most cases, those responsible have not been identified. In this context, a group of local producers in Loreto criminally sued the alleged perpetrators of fires that arose in the area of National Route 118.

On 1 March 2022, Valdés announced that there were no active outbreaks.

== Consequences ==
According to official organizations and private entities, the material losses are estimated at a sum of at least 25,000 million pesos, although the calculations of the Ministry of Production of the Government of Corrientes foresee that the amount is around 40,000 million. The regional economies were strongly affected in the areas of livestock, agriculture, forestry and ecotourism.

In terms of environmental and ecological damage, the consequences have not yet been measured, but there is knowledge of a great impact on the ecosystem and biodiversity, especially in the Iberá area. The native flora and fauna was seriously damaged by the fire, which caused the death of wild animals such as capybaras, maned wolves, alligators, marsh deer and other species, as well as their flight from the areas where they usually live.

== See also ==
- 2020s in environmental history
