= Villa del Rosario, Entre Ríos =

Villa del Rosario
- City
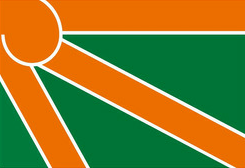
- Flag

- Location of Villa del Rosario in Argentina
- Coordinates: 30°47′S 57°55′W
- Country: Argentina
- Province: Entre Ríos
- Department: Federación

Population (2010)
  - Total: 3,973
- Time zone: UTC−3 (ART)
- CPA base: E3229
- Dialing code: +54 3456

Villa del Rosario is a city in the northeast of the province of Entre Ríos, Argentina. It has 3,973 inhabitants as per the 2010 census [INDEC]. It lies about 9 km from the western banks of the Uruguay River near the mouth of the Mocoretá River and the reservoir of the Salto Grande Dam, and 23 km north of Federación.
