= Federación =

- Federación, Entre Ríos, Argentina
- Federación Department, Argentina
- Federación Municipality, Falcón State, Venezuela
