= National Route 120 (Argentina) =

Highway in Argentina

Coordinates: 27°37′04″S 56°23′49″W

National Route 120
- Ruta nacional 120

Route information
- Length: 58 km (36 mi)

Major junctions
- E end: 9 kilometres (6 mi) N of Gobernador Virasoro
- N end: 31 kilometres (19 mi) E of Ituzaingó

Location
- Country: Argentina

Highway system
- Highways in Argentina

National Route 120 is a national road in Argentina, running NW in Corrientes. It starts at the joining with National Route 14, 9 kilometres (6 mi) north of the town of Gobernador Virasoro and runs for 58 kilometres (36 mi) until it connects to National Route 12 31 kilometres (19 mi) east of Ituzaingó. The road is marked in red in the map. Previously this road was known as Provincial Route 38 and changed to national jurisdiction in an agreement between Dirección Nacional de Vialidad and the provincial transport authorities, signed by Law # 5152 of Corrientes Province on 3 April 1997

The whole length of the road is within Corrientes Province, crossing through Santo Tomé Department and Ituzaingó Department.

== Old road ==
In previous times there was a road with this number on the West of Corrientes Province. With a length of 45 kilometres (28 mi), it ran eastwards from the city of Goya. Today this older road is part of National Route 12. This section is marked in green on the map.
