= Chajarí =

- City
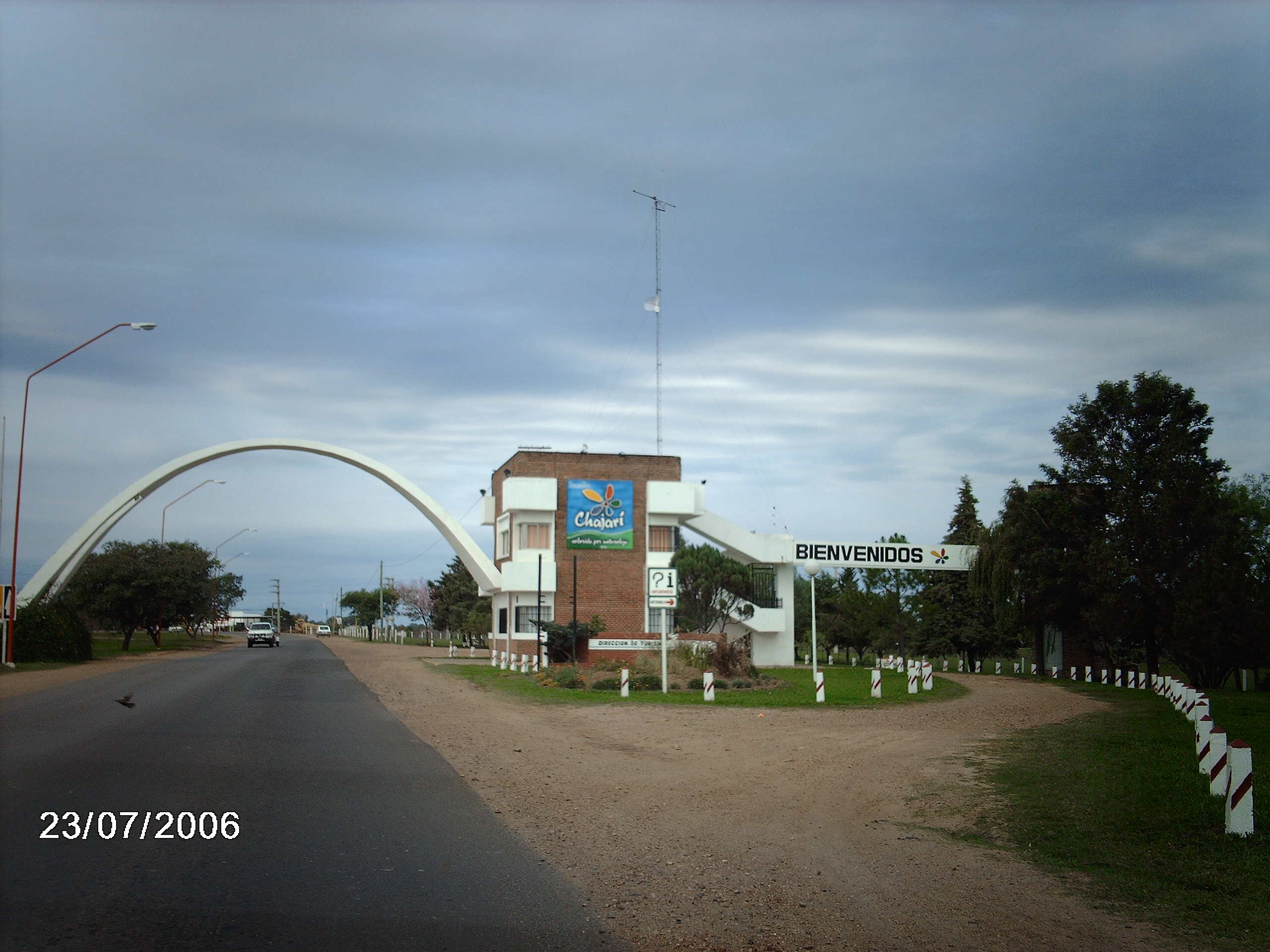

- Location of Chajarí in Argentina
- Coordinates: 30°46′S 57°59′W
- Country: Argentina
- Province: Entre Ríos
- Department: Federación
- Founded: May 28, 1872
- Elevation: 34 m (112 ft)

Population (2010 census)
  - Total: 32,734
- Time zone: UTC−3 (ART)
- CPA base: E3228
- Dialing code: +54 3456
- Website: Official website

Chajarí is a city in the northeast of the province of Entre Ríos, Argentina. It has 45.000 inhabitants per the 2010 census [INDEC], and it is the largest city in the Federación Department. It lies on Provincial Route 2, about 2 km east of the intersection with National Route 14 and west of the Salto Grande reservoir on the Uruguay River, 330 km from the provincial capital Paraná.

The settlement of Chajarí was populated after joint efforts of the provincial and national governments to encourage colonization. The original town, called Villa Libertad, was founded on 28 May 1872; colonists began arriving in 1876 from several regions of Europe. The municipal government was established in 1889, and in 1934 the town changed its name to match that of its railway station, Chajarí.

Chajarí has hot springs, like many other towns and cities in the east of Entre Ríos, and in September 2001 it opened facilities for visitors interested in the therapeutic properties of its waters. It also has a camping site by the artificial Salto Grande lake, 15–20 km from the city proper, which can be used for fishing and water sports.
