= National Route 119 (Argentina) =

Highway in Argentina

National Route 119
- Ruta nacional 119

Route information
- Length: 109 km (68 mi)

Major junctions
- S end: Paraje Cuatro Bocas
- N end: National Route 123 in Mercedes

Location
- Country: Argentina

Highway system
- Highways in Argentina

National Route 119 is a national road in Argentina, running north in the Center-South of Corrientes Province. It starts at the crossing with national routes 14 and 127 running for 109 kilometres (68 mi) until it crosses National Route 123 in Mercedes. The road is marked in red in the map. The whole length of the road is within Corrientes Province, crossing through Monte Caseros Department, Curuzú Cuatiá Department, and Mercedes Department.

== Old road ==
In previous times there was a road with this number in the same province. With a length of 108 kilometres (67 mi) this unpaved road joined the town of La Cruz near the Uruguay River with the old Route 14 (today Provincial Route 40). By agreement of 27 July 1971] this road fell under the provincial control as Provincial Route 114, still unpaved. This section is marked in green on the map.
