= National Route 101 (Argentina) =

Highway in Argentina

National Route 101
- Ruta nacional 101

Route information
- Length: 145 km (90 mi)

Major junctions
- S end: Bernardo de Irigoyen
- N end: Puerto Iguazú

Location
- Country: Argentina

Highway system
- Highways in Argentina

National Route 101 is a national road in the northwest of Misiones Province, Argentina ending at Iguazu National Park. It runs for 145 km (90 mi) near the border between Argentina and Brazil crossing the Misiones Province Departments of General Manuel Belgrano and Iguazú.

After decades of difficult travel on this road, especially after rains, it was decided to pave it starting from the south end. The work was contracted with a financial agreement with the federal government and under the technical supervision and administration of the Dirección Provincial de Vialidad (Provincial Dept. of Transportation).

In 2006 the Dirección Provincial de Vialidad paved the section between Bernardo de Irigoyen and San Antonio. The next 30 km (19 mi) until the rural area known as Piñalito Norte were completed in mid-2007. The section between Piñalito Norte and Provincial Route 19 is under construction. The following 44 km (27 mi) until Puerto Iguazú International Airport is unpaved, while the section from the airport to the junction with National Route 12 is paved.
