= Santo Antônio do Sudoeste =

Municipality in Paraná, Brazil

Coordinates: 26°04′S 53°44′W

- Municipality
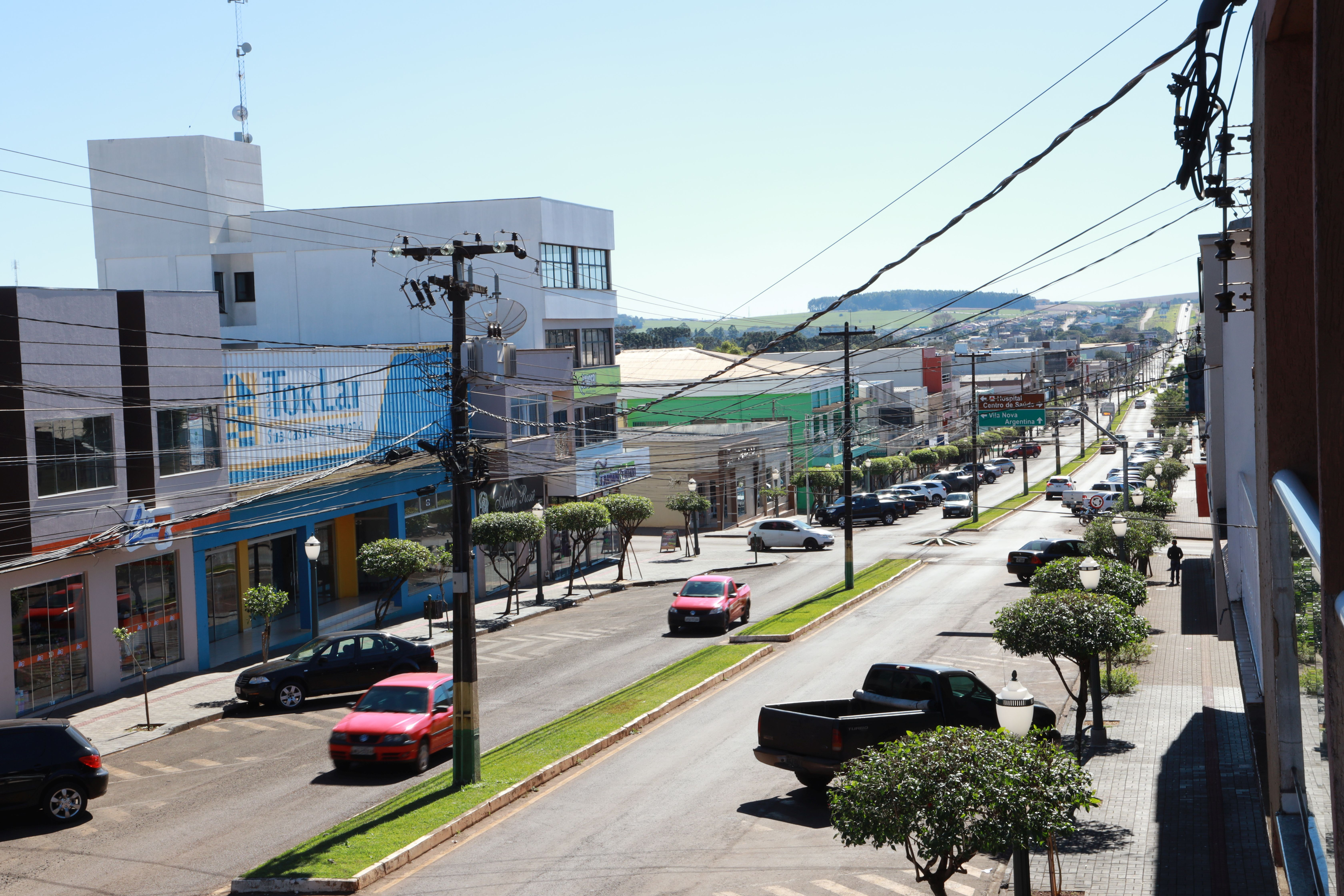
- View of the town

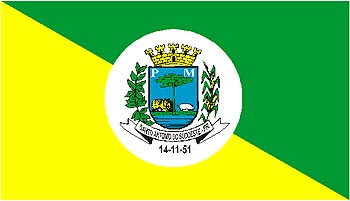
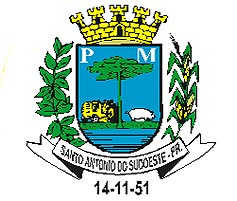
- Flag Coat of arms
- Interactive map of Santo Antônio do Sudoeste
- Country: Brazil
- Time zone: UTC−3 (BRT)

Santo Antônio do Sudoeste (lit. 'Saint Anthony of the Southwest') is a municipality in the state of Paraná, Brazil with a population of 20,261 inhabitants. It is on the border between Argentina and Brazil, opposite the Argentine city of San Antonio, Misiones. The San Antonio River separates the two cities.

== See also ==
- List of municipalities in Paraná
