= Villa del Rosario =

Villa del Rosario is the name of several places:

- Villa del Rosario, Córdoba, Argentina
- Villa del Rosario, Entre Ríos, Argentina
- Villa del Rosario, the former name of present-day Rosario, Santa Fe, Argentina
- Villa del Rosario, Norte de Santander, Colombia
- Villa del Rosario, Paraguay, San Pedro, Paraguay
- Villa del Rosario, Uruguay, village in Lavalleja Department, Uruguay
- Villa del Rosario, Venezuela, town in the Zulia State.
