= National Route 105 (Argentina) =

Highway in Argentina

National Route 105
- Ruta nacional 105

Route information
- Length: 35 km (22 mi)

Major junctions
- North end: Near Villalonga
- South end: National Route 14

Location
- Country: Argentina

Highway system
- Highways in Argentina

National Route 105 is a national road in the SW of Misiones Province, Argentina. From its start National Route 12 in Villalonga outside of the capital city of Posadas until its end at National Route 14, it has a total length of 35 kilometres (22 mi). The road is marked in red in the map.

Before Decree #1595 of 1979, Provincial Route 1 went from Villalonga to Azara, going through San José and Apóstoles. The aforementioned decree transferred the road north of Route 14 to federal jurisdiction.

Milestones:

- Capital Department: Villalonga (km 0), Parada Leis (km 16), junction provincial route 205 in Fachinal (km 21)
- Toll booth in Fachinal (km 23)
- Apóstoles Department: Pindapoy (km 34) and San José

== Management ==
The Dirección Provincial de Vialidad (Provincial Dept. of Transportation) has the concession to manage and maintain this road. In 2002 it installed the toll booths in Fachinal.

== History ==
Before 1979 there was another road with this number in the province. It went from Santa Ana to the small town of Santa Rita, crossing through the town of Oberá, shown in green on the map. Federal Law #23153 of 9 November 1984 transferred jurisdiction of the road to the federal government and renamed it as National Route 103, as another route already had the number 105 on the west side of Misiones Province. It was transferred back to the province in 1993 and is today part of route 103. The paving of the section between Oberá and Alba Posse was done after the transfer.
