= Dos Hermanas, Argentina =

Dos Hermanas
- Village
- Location of the village in Argentina Dos Hermanas (Argentina)
- Coordinates: 26°17′39″S 53°45′26″W
- Country: Argentina
- Province: Misiones
- Department: General Manuel Belgrano

Population (2010)
  - Total: 1,956
- Time zone: UTC−3 (ART)

Dos Hermanas is a village located in the General Manuel Belgrano Department in the Misiones Province in northeastern Argentina. Administratively, it is part of the municipality of Bernardo de Irigoyen, from whose urban center is about 11 km (6.8 mi). The area corresponds to mountains of more than 700 meters of altitude, being the highest part of the province.
