= Juan Pujol =

Juan Pujol may refer to:

- Juan Pujol, Argentina, a town in Argentina
- Juan Pujol García (1912–1988), Spanish spy and double agent
- Juan Pujol (cyclist) (born 1952), Spanish racing cyclist
