= Autoroute 5 =

Autoroute 5 may refer to:

- A5 autoroute, in France
- Quebec Autoroute 5, in Quebec, Canada

== See also ==
- A5 road
- List of A5 roads
- List of highways numbered 5
