= National Route 121 (Argentina) =

Highway in Argentina

National Route 121
- Ruta nacional 121

Route information
- Maintained by Mercovias
- Length: 8.3 km (5.2 mi)
- Existed: 1997–present

Major junctions
- W end: National Route 14
- E end: Brazilian border

Location
- Country: Argentina

Highway system
- Highways in Argentina

National Route 121 is a national road in Argentina, running East in Corrientes. In its 8.3 kilometres (5 mi) paved length, it joins Km 683 marker of National Route 14, near the town of Santo Tomé and the Puente de la Integración ("Integration Bridge") of 1,403 metres (4,603 ft) over the Uruguay River crossing the border into Brazil to the town of São Borja.

== Main Points ==
- km 2.2: access to Santo Tomé
- km 5.3: toll booth
- km 5.5: border crossing and immigration booth
- km 7.6: international bridge

The road was built in 1997 by the Mercovias company along with the international bridge in a 25-year public lease.
