= Daymán River =

Coordinates: 31°30′16″S 58°1′56″W

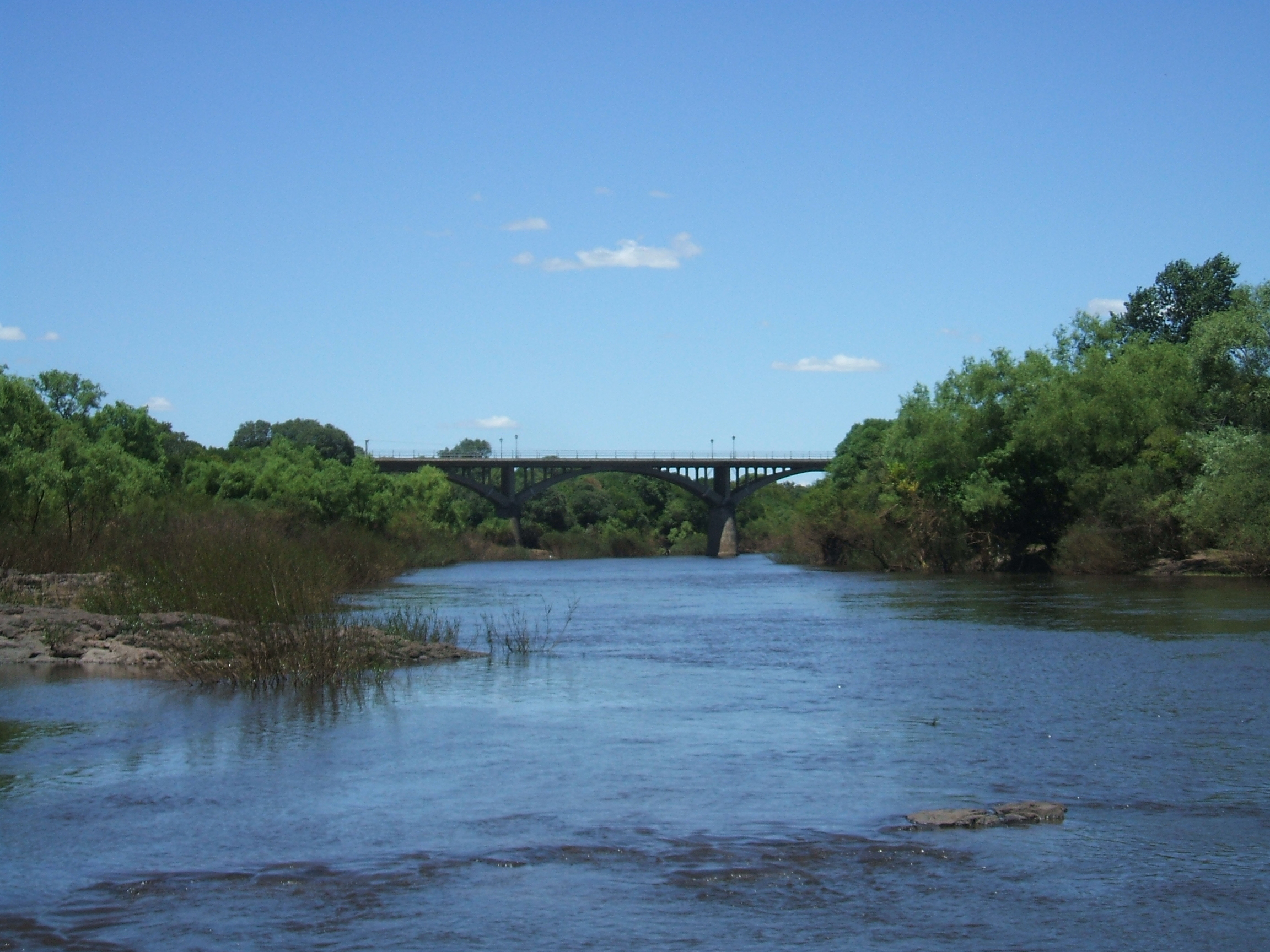

Location
- Country: Uruguay

Physical characteristics
- Mouth
  - location: Uruguay River

The Daymán River (Spanish, Río Daymán) is a river of Uruguay. It is a tributary of the Uruguay River.

== See also ==
- List of rivers of Uruguay
