= National Route A009 (Argentina) =

Highway in Argentina

- Ruta nacional A009

Route information
- Length: 12 km (7.5 mi)

Major junctions
- E end: Puerto Reconquista
- W end: Reconquista

Location
- Country: Argentina

Highway system
- Highways in Argentina

National Route A009 is a highway in the northeast of Santa Fe Province, Argentina. It has a length of 12 km (7 mi) joining Puerto Reconquista on the east side of the Paraná River with National Route 11 at km marker 787, in the city of Reconquista, in General Obligado Department.

In 1990 the most travelled national roads were offered as concessions with toll-collection rights, in public bids, dividing them in areas calles "Corredores Viales" (Road Corridors). In the same year, the Servicios Viales company won the maintenance and administration contact for Corredor Vial 8, which includes this road.

In 2003 the contracts expired so a new round of public bidding was called for the concessions of the Corredores Viales. The numbering system was changed and a contract was signed with the Vial company for the newly renumbered Corredor Vial 3.
