= National Route A003 (Argentina) =

Highway in Argentina

- Ruta nacional A003
- Acceso a Tigre

Route information
- Length: 8.8 km (5.5 mi)

Major junctions
- South end: Boulogne
- North end: Tigre

Location
- Country: Argentina

Highway system
- Highways in Argentina

National Route A003, also known as Tigre Access, is an 8.8-kilometre-long (5.5 mi) four-lane highway. It goes from the junction with National Route 9 and Camino de Cintura (Provincial Route 4) to the town of Tigre, passing the towns of:

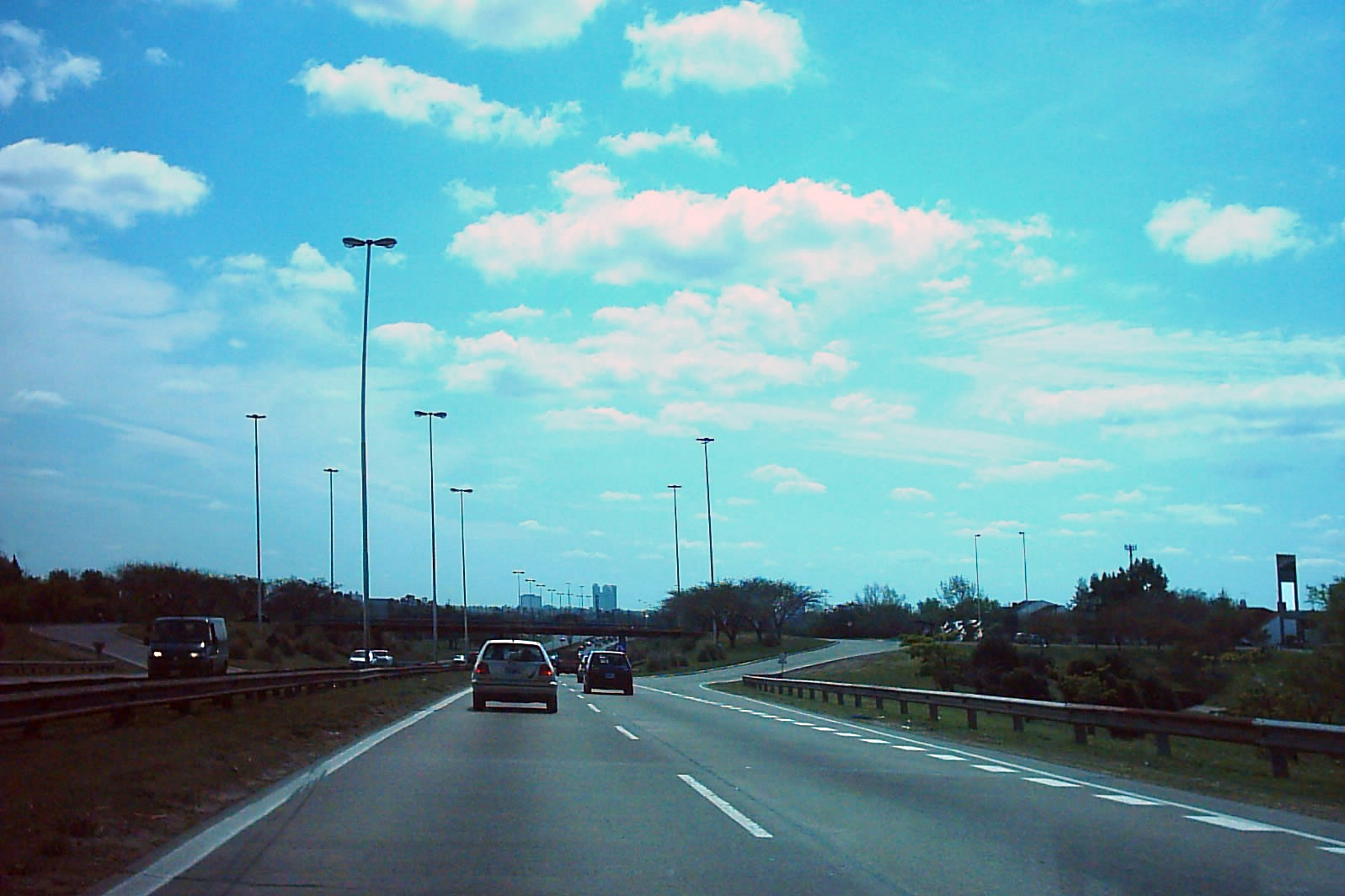
National Route A003 in Lomas de San Isidro.

- Boulogne
- San Isidro
- Béccar
- Victoria
- Virreyes
- San Fernando

== Administration ==
In 1993 the Federal Government opened a bid for the Buenos Aires road access network. The winner for the maintenance contract for the North Access roads was Autopistas del Sol. North Access includes Avenida General Paz, National Route A003, and a portion of National Route 8, National Route 9.

Autopistas del Sol signed the Concession Contract on 26 May 1994. Tolls started being collected in August 1996, after the company finished the road improvements according to the contract.

The Concession Contract ended on 31 December 2020.
