= National Route 18 (Argentina) =

Highway in Argentina

National Route 18 is an Argentine paved highway, which crosses the province of Entre Ríos from west to east. Beginning in San Benito, a few km east of Paraná, at km 451 of National Route 12, it ends 25 km southwest of Concordia, at km. 240 of National Route 14 . Its route is 227 km. It has been in the process of being transformed into a highway since 2015 .

== Cities ==
The cities and towns with more than 1,500 inhabitants that are accessed by this route from west to east are the following:

- Paraná
- Villaguay
- San Salvador
- Concordia

== History ==
In the original national route numbering plan of September 3, 1935, National Route 18 ran between Concordia and Paso de los Piuquenes, between the Province of San Juan and the neighboring Republic of Chile, although the westernmost section was the one built in 1927 that through a cornice road linked the City of San Juan and Calingasta. The stretch west of the last town was never built.

In 1943 the National Highway Directorate made a numbering change for national routes, whereby National Route 18 was reduced to the Province of Entre Ríos, while the rest was divided between National Route 19 (east of the city of Córdoba) and National Route 20 (to the west of said city).

In 2010, this road joined the Road Corridor 4 for the bidding, with the temporary union of companies Carreteras Centrales de Argentina winning. He took charge of it on April 22 of that year. Previously, this route was part of four networks of the recovery and maintenance contract system.

== The Transformation into a highway ==
In the last days of June 2008, the President of Argentina Cristina Fernández de Kirchner, and the Governor of the province, Sergio Daniel Urribarri, signed the Historic Infrastructure Reparation Act for Entre Ríos. Made up of more than 115 works, extracted from the strategic infrastructure plan, it represents an investment of more than 3,200 million pesos.

The implementation of the project to transform national route 18 into a highway constitutes a shared effort between the Nation and the Province, together with the start of pre-investment studies for the future physical link over the Paraná river in the metropolitan area of Paraná and Santa Fe, to consolidate and strengthen the central biooceanic corridor of the Argentine Republic.

In the area of bridges, the expansion of existing structures or the construction of new bridges in a length of more than 1500 meters is proposed, of which the vast majority correspond to an average width of between 8 m and 9.00 m to new bridges of 17 meters. Wide. The widening of the existing culverts has been planned for a total length of more than 2,000 meters, of which half is planned as a widening centered on a missing width of 12.00m on average and the rest towards one of the sides on average width to build 9.00m.

The different crossings with the existing routes were designed, through distributors and interchanges type: cloverleaf, diamond, crossing over level and roundabouts of different proportions.

In the accesses to Viale and Villaguay, high-level solutions have been planned, as well as in the trunk railway. While the level intersections solve the crossings with the provincial routes No. 32, in the Paraná department a few kilometers from Viale, with the No. 6 that crosses the province from north to south in the central region, with the No. 20 coincides with the access to Villaguay, with No. 23 at the height of San Salvador and with No. 37 at the access to General Campos. The other roundabout-type intersections allow accessibility with the network of secondary and local roads. In all the main meetings, the inclusion of collector streets, docks and halts for public passenger transport, public lighting and horizontal and vertical signage has been planned.

To avoid crossing the city of San Salvador, a peripheral ring road was designed with accessibility nodes at both ends and the conversion of the current route into an urban boulevard .

In general terms, the highway contemplates partial access control, collectors in strategic areas, landscape design, transport stops, service areas, access portals to the surrounding towns and returns every 5 km on average.

The work will be fully financed with resources from the National Highway Administration . It will be divided into 4 sections and its execution period will be 3 years. A total of 343 kilometers of dual carriageway were built, in five different sections, four of them divided into two sections, adding an investment of more than 3,000 million pesos. In Corrientes another 153 kilometers were executed.
