= National Route A010 (Argentina) =

Highway in Argentina

- Ruta nacional A010

Route information
- Length: 6.5 km (4.0 mi)

Major junctions
- W end: National Route 3
- E end: Puerto Madryn

Location
- Country: Argentina

Highway system
- Highways in Argentina

National Route A010 is a highway in the northeast of Chubut Province, Argentina. It has a length of 6.5 km (4.0 mi) joining National Route 3 at its km marker 1,395, with the city of Puerto Madryn, in Biedma Department.

The road continues west of National Route 3 as Provincial Route 4. By National Decree #1595 of 1979 the section of Provincial Route 4 east of National Route 3 changed to federal control.

On km marker 2.2 there is the Puerto Madryn aero-club and airfield.
