= Urugua-í Provincial Park =

Provincial park in Misiones, Argentina

- Parque Provincial Urugua-í
- IUCN category II (national park)
- Location within Argentina
- Nearest city: San Antonio, Misiones
- Coordinates: 25.842670°S 54.102169°W
- Area: 84,000 hectares (210,000 acres)
- Designation: Provincial park
- Created: 5 October 1990
- Administrator: Subsecretaría de Ecología, Misiones

The Urugua-í Provincial Park (Spanish: Parque Provincial Urugua-í) is a Provincial park in the Misiones Province in the northeast of Argentina. It protects an area of Alto Paraná Atlantic forests in the upper basin of the Urugua-í River.

== Location ==
The Urugua-í Provincial Park is in the north of Misiones Province, Argentina, divided between the municipalities of Comandante Andresito, San Antonio and Bernardo de Irigoyen. It adjoins the southeast corner of the Iguazú National Park. It has an area of 84,000 hectares (210,000 acres). This makes it the third largest protected area of the Alto Paraná Atlantic forests after Argentina's Iguazú National Park and Brazil's Iguaçu National Park. The Sierra de la Victoria crosses part of the park. The Urugua-í River flows through the southern part of the park in a southeast – northwest direction and is impounded by the Urugua-í Dam to the west of the park.

== History ==
A nature reserve was created in the area of the present park by decree 1.539 on 1982 with an area of 10,037 hectares (24,800 acres). It was Argentina's first nature reserve. In 1988 provincial decree 339 annexed an additional 74,000 hectares (180,000 acres). The present Urugua-í Provincial Park was created by provincial law 2.794 of 5 October 1990 to protect the ecosystem of the Urugua-í River basin. It compensates for the flooding of 8,800 hectares (22,000 acres) of the lower Urugua-í River basin caused by construction of the Urugua-í Dam. The park would be part of the proposed Trinational Biodiversity Corridor, which aims to provide forest connections between conservation units in Brazil, Paraguay and Argentina in the Upper Paraná ecoregion.

== Environment ==
The terrain is gently rolling in the west, with more mountainous land in the north and east where it approaches the Sierra de la Victoria, which crosses the north-southeast part of the park and forms a watershed between the Iguazu and Urugua-í rivers. The climate is subtropical rainy, with no dry season. There are five months when frosts occur. Average annual precipitation along the Urugua-í varies from 1,800 millimetres (71 in) at its mouth to 2,000 millimetres (79 in) near the town of Bernardo de Irigoyen. The park has a wide range of vegetation types in the valleys and mountains, including some remnants of Araucaria angustifolia in the southwest.

44 species of fish have been recorded, of which 6 are endemic to one of the two river basins. There are 32 species of amphibians and 29 species of reptiles. Mammals total 77 species in 26 families. These include giant anteater (Myrmecophaga tridactyla), tufted capuchin (Sapajus apella), jaguar (Panthera onca), bush dog (Speothos venaticus), South American tapir (Tapirus terrestris), white-lipped peccary (Tayassu pecari) and collared peccary (Pecari tajacu). There are about 20 globally threatened and 20 near-threatened vertebrates. There are 261 species of insects, 130 of butterflies.

346 bird species have been recorded, although some are dubious. Species include bare-faced curassow (Crax fasciolata), blue-winged macaw (Primolius maracana), blue-bellied parrot (Triclaria malachitacea), red-spectacled amazon (Amazona pretrei), purple-winged ground dove (Claravis geoffroyi), Temminck's seedeater (Sporophila falcirostris), Brazilian merganser (Mergus octosetaceus), grey-bellied hawk (Accipiter poliogaster), harpy eagle (Harpia harpyja) and canebrake groundcreeper (Clibanornis dendrocolaptoides). The park is an important site for conserving the black-fronted piping guan (Pipile jacutinga) in Argentina.

== Facilities ==
The Uruzu Ranger Station is the park's headquarters, accessible via Provincial Route 19 and staffed with rangers. It has a visitor center, trails, camping areas, electricity and drinking water. Visitors may follow interpretive trails, watch birds, and observe the tracks and specimens of animals. The Route 101 Ranger Station is accessible via National Route 101. It is a small camping area with electricity and drinking water.

== Sources ==
- Araújo Corte, Dione Angélica de; Valladares-Pádua, Cláudio Benedito (November 2007), Plano de Manejo da Estação Ecológica Mico-Leão-Preto (PDF) (in Portuguese), Brasília: ICMBio, archived from the original (PDF) on 2016-11-07
- Important Bird Areas factsheet: Parque Provincial Urugua-í (in Spanish), BirdLife International, 2016
- "Parque Provincial Urugua-í (AICA)", Ruta de la Selva (in Spanish), archived from the original on 2016-09-20
- Parque Provincial "Urugua-í" (in Spanish), Ministerio de Ecología y RNR de la Provincia de Misiones, archived from the original on 2016-08-21
- Parque Provincial URUGUA-I (in Spanish), SIFAP • Sistema Federal de Áreas Protegidas, archived from the original on 2016-03-07
