= National Route 117 (Argentina) =

Highway in Argentina

National Route 117
- Ruta nacional 117

Route information
- Length: 12.9 km (8.0 mi)

Major junctions
- West end: Near Paso de los Libres
- East end: Paso de los Libres-Uruguaiana International Bridge

Location
- Country: Argentina

Highway system
- Highways in Argentina

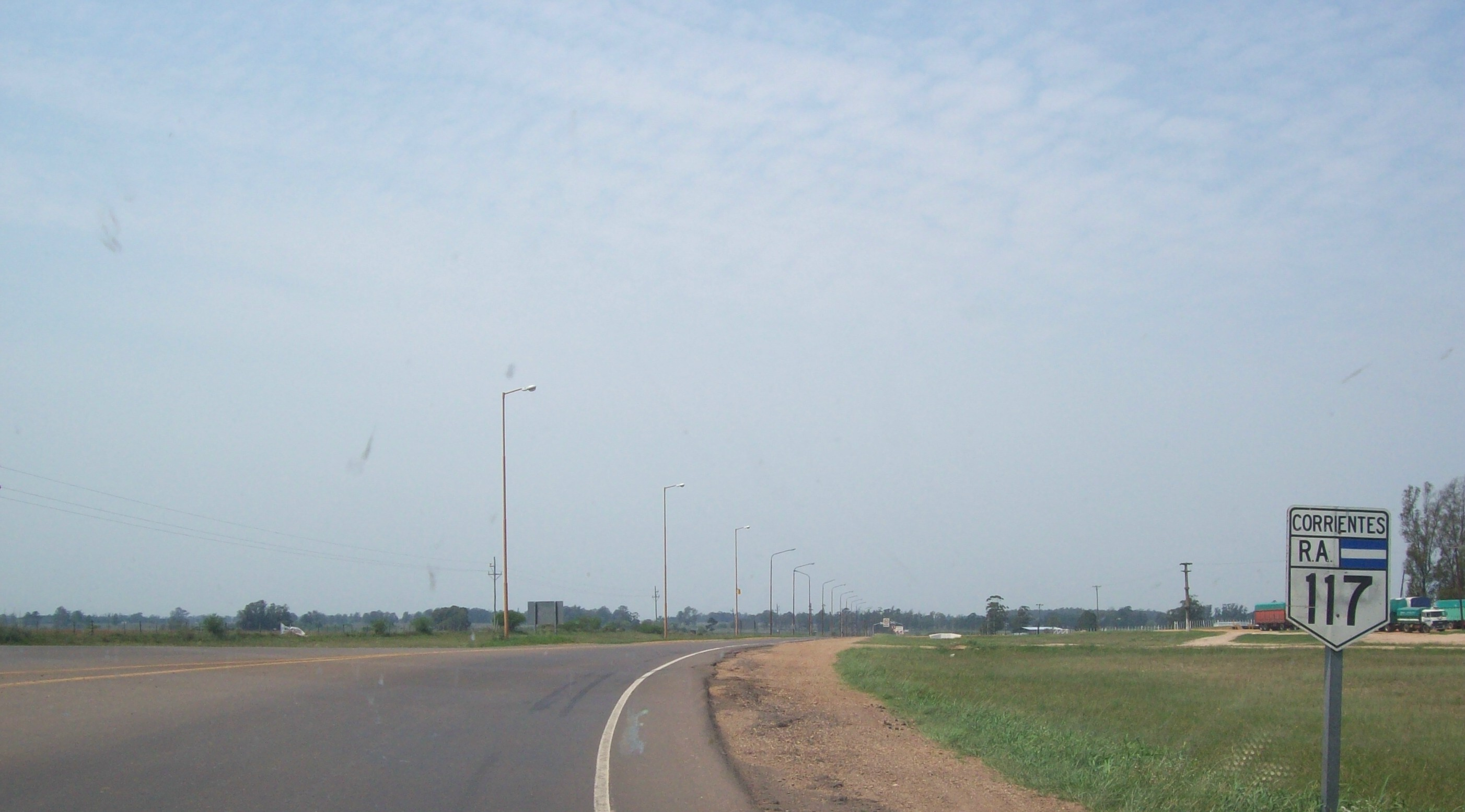
Start (km 0) of National Route 117, near Paso de los Libres

National Route 117 is a national road in Argentina, in Paso de los Libres Department in the SE of Corrientes Province. From its start in km marker 496 of National Route 14 until its end at the Paso de los Libres-Uruguaiana International Bridge (crossing the Uruguay River) unites the cities of Paso de los Libres, Argentina and Uruguaiana, Brazil for a total length of 12.9 kilometres (8 mi). The road is marked in red in the map.

Before 1980 this road was known as National Route 126.

Milestones:

- km marker 10.1: Exit to Paso de los Libres by means of Provincial Route 40
- km marker 11.2: Customs and border patrol control
- km marker 12.2: International bridge

== Management ==
In 1990 a federal law decreed the development of the most travelled national routes by means of concessions to private companies in delineated Corredores Viales (Road Corridors). Designated Corredor Vial 18, it was given to the company that had the winning bid, Caminos del Río Uruguay S.A. (CRUSA). There are no toll booths on this route.

In 1996 the concession was extended to 28 years under the condition that the winning bidder built a highway between the Zárate-Brazo Largo Bridge and Gualeguaychú. The section between the General Justo José de Urquiza Bridge and Ceibas (corresponding to National Route 12) was completed on 12 October 1999. Due to the peso devaluation in 2002, construction was stopped on the section between Gualeguaychú and National Route 14.

== History ==
Before 1980 there was another road with this number. It was the route in the NW of Corrientes Province, marked in green on the map and now called National Route 118. Decree #1595 of 1979, ceded the previous road to the administration of Corrientes Province. Decree 1715 from 1988 annuls the previous decree and this road became National Route 118 as number 117 had been used on this road.
