= Comandante Andresito =

- Municipality and village
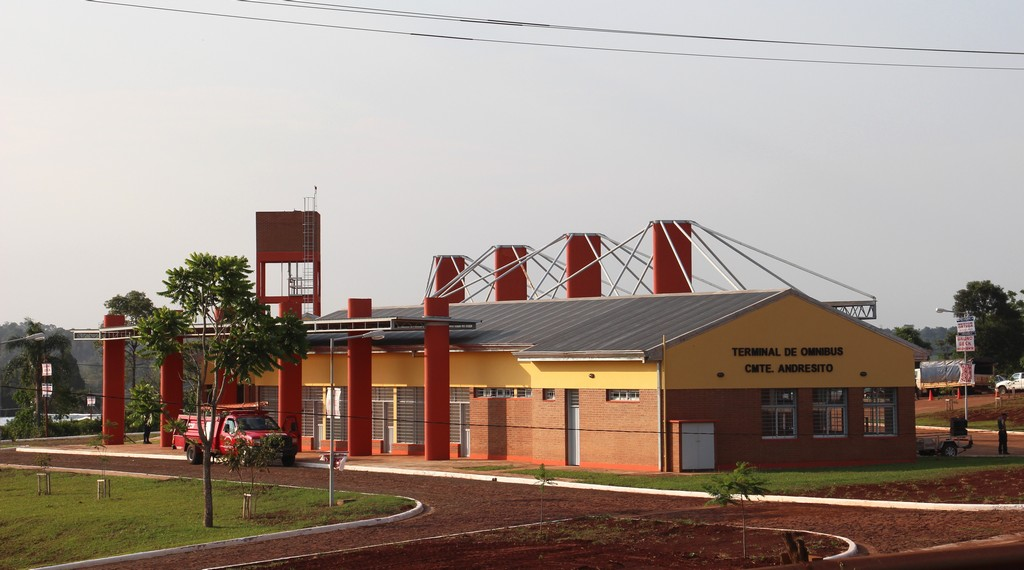

- Location within Misiones Province Location within Argentina
- Country: Argentina
- Province: Misiones Province

Government
  - Intendant: Bruno Beck
- Time zone: UTC−3 (ART)

Comandante Andresito is a village and municipality in Misiones Province in north-eastern Argentina.

The municipality contains part of the 84,000 hectares (210,000 acres) Urugua-í Provincial Park, created in 1990.
