= National Route A014 (Argentina) =

Highway in Argentina

- Ruta nacional A014

Route information
- Length: 16 km (9.9 mi)

Major junctions
- N end: National Route 40

Location
- Country: Argentina

Highway system
- Highways in Argentina

National Route A014 is a 4-lane ring-road around the city of San Juan, San Juan Province, Argentina. It goes south from its junction with National Route 40.

The road traverses the San Juan departments of Capital, Rivadavia and Santa Lucía
