= National Route A019 (Argentina) =

Highway in Argentina

- Ruta nacional A019
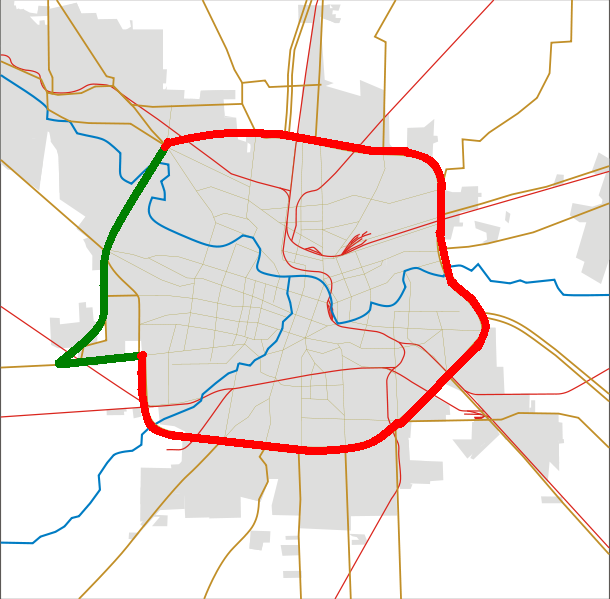

Route information
- Length: 46 km (29 mi)

Major junctions
- Beltway around Córdoba

Location
- Country: Argentina

Highway system
- Highways in Argentina

National Route A019 is a beltway road around the city of Córdoba, capital of Córdoba Province in Argentina. When the final section on the northwest sector finishes construction, it will have a length of 46 km (29 mi). As of 2006, there were a few kilometers unfinished between the access road to the Taravella (Córdoba) Airport and Provincial Route E53) and the Chateau Carreras football stadium.

== Administration ==
This road belongs to the Córdoba Road Network (Red de Accesos a Córdoba), which was given in concession to the Caminos de las Sierras company in November 1997 with a 25-year contract. It is the only road in the network that does not have toll booths.
