= National Route A007 (Argentina) =

Highway in Argentina

- Ruta nacional A007
- Avenida de Circunvalación

Major junctions
- Beltway around Santa Fe

Location
- Country: Argentina

Highway system
- Highways in Argentina

National Route A007 also known as Mar Argentino ("Argentine Sea") or Avenida de Circunvalación ("Beltway Avenue") in the city of Santa Fe, Decree #2084/1980, runs in a north–south direction, through the flood valleys of the Salado and Paraná rivers, around the city of Santa Fe.

Several sections of this road had to be dynamited to allow Salado flood waters to go through during the April 2003 floods in Santa Fe, as it was acting as a container and relief was urgently needed.
