= National Route A015 (Argentina) =

Highway in Argentina

Coordinates: 31°16′48″S 58°04′35″W

- Ruta nacional A015

Route information
- Length: 15 km (9.3 mi)

Major junctions
- Southwest end: National Route 14
- Northeast end: Salto Grande Dam access-road

Location
- Country: Argentina

Highway system
- Highways in Argentina

National Route A015 is a national highway in the northeast of Entre Ríos Province, Argentina. It runs 15 km (9 mi), fully paved, from the junction with National Route 14 at kilometre 269 in the small town of La Criolla to the access road of the Salto Grande Dam.

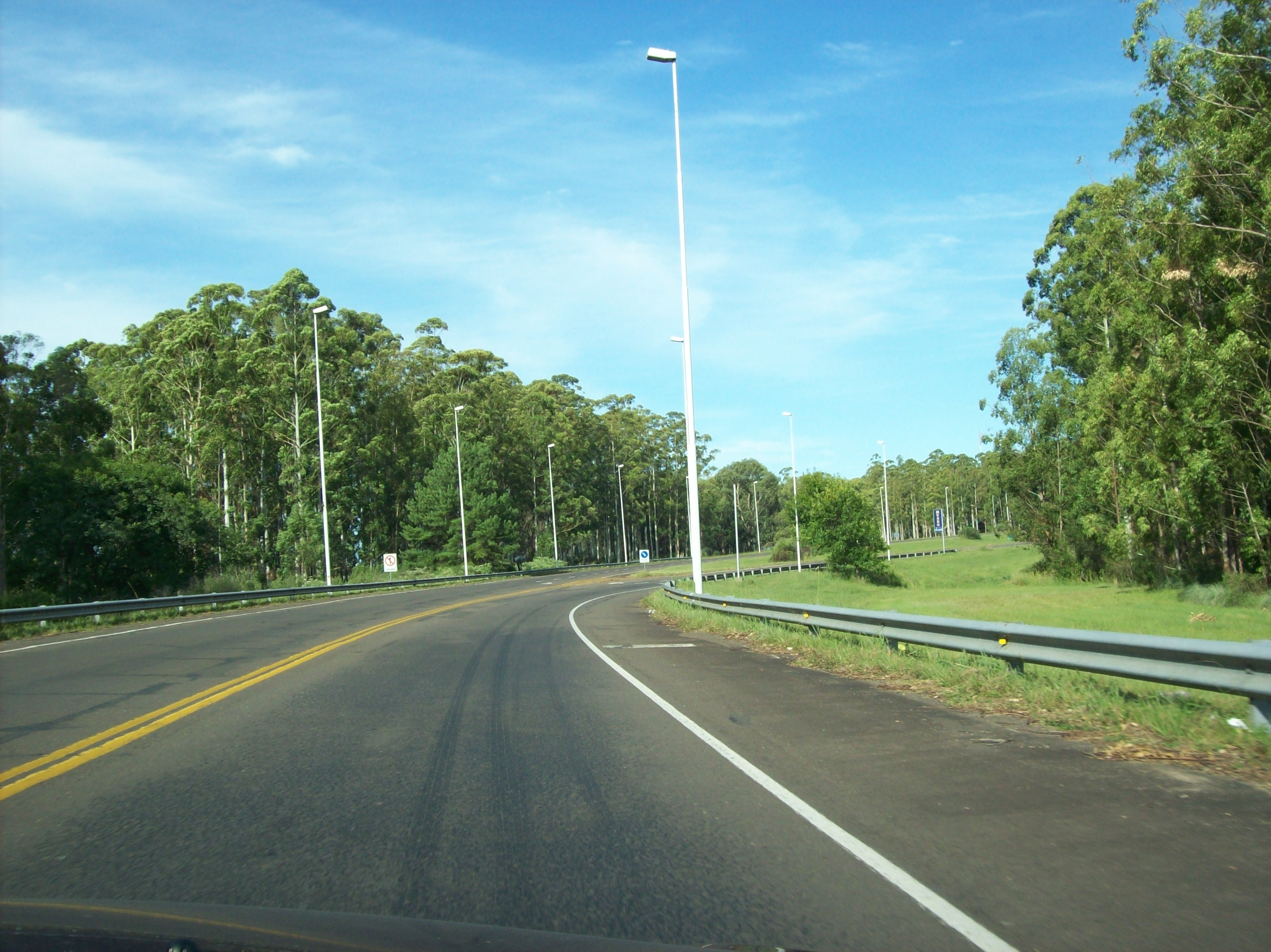
National Route A015, near the Uruguayan border.

== Route description ==
The route begins at the junction with National Route 14 in La Criolla, in the Concordia Department, and runs northeast to the access road of the Salto Grande Dam on the Uruguay River. The whole length is paved.

The route is the Argentine access to the Concordia–Salto international border crossing, whose facilities stand at the Salto Grande hydroelectric complex. The crossing connects Concordia in Argentina with Salto in Uruguay and continues as Route 3 on the Uruguayan side. Argentine agencies, including the immigration service, customs and the National Gendarmerie, operate together at the border complex on the route. The crossing is open to private vehicles 24 hours a day; freight and passenger transport cross between 7:00 and 19:00.

== Condition ==
A technical report prepared by National Road Directorate workers, describing the network at the end of 2025, listed the route among the most deteriorated national roads in Argentina. The report describes a road in poor condition, with critical sections, deficient signage, longitudinal cracking and damaged shoulders, and notes that the directorate had fined the former concessionaire over its state.
