= List of A5 roads =

A5 Road may refer to:

Africa

- A5 highway (Nigeria), a road connecting Lagos and Ibadan
- A5 road (Zimbabwe), a road connecting Harare and Bulawayo

Americas

- Quebec Autoroute 5, a road in Quebec, Canada
- County Route A5 (California) or Bowman Road, California, USA
- A005 road (Argentina), a road connecting National Route 8 and National Route 36 in the city of Río Cuarto, Córdoba Province

Asia

- A5 road (Malaysia), a road in Sabah connecting the Route A4 (Sandakan) and Tawau
- A 5 road (Sri Lanka), a road connecting Peradeniya and Chenkaladi via Badulla
- A5 road, an expressway in China connecting A4 Shanyang Interchange and Jiangsu Province Boundary

Australasia

- Leichhardt Highway, a road connecting Goondiwindi and Westwood
- Anzac Highway, a road connecting the Adelaide central business district to the beachside suburb of Glenelg
- Lake Highway, a road connecting Melton Mowbray and Deloraine

British Isles

- A5 road (Great Britain), a road connecting London in England and Holyhead in Wales
- A5 road (Isle of Man), a road connecting Douglas with Port Erin
- A5 road (Northern Ireland), a road connecting Derry and the southern border with the Republic of Ireland

Continental Europe

- A5 motorway (Austria), a road connecting Vienna and Drasenhofen on the Czech border
- A5 motorway (Bulgaria), a road connecting Varna and Burgas
- A5 motorway (Croatia), a road connecting the Hungarian border, Osijek, the A3, and the Bosnian border
- A5 motorway (Cyprus), a road connecting the A1 motorway (at the level of Kofinou village) with the A3 near Larnaca
- A5 motorway (France), a road connecting the Parisian region with the Langres area
- A5 motorway (Germany), a road connecting Hattenbach and the Swiss border near Basel
- A5 motorway (Greece), a road connecting Ioannina and Patras
- A5 motorway (Italy), a road connecting Turin and the Mont-Blanc Tunnel
- A5 road (Latvia), a road connecting Riga and Salaspils - Babīte
- A5 highway (Lithuania), a road connecting Kaunas to the Poland border
- A5 motorway (Netherlands), a road connecting Amsterdam and Hoofddorp
- A5 motorway (Portugal), a road connecting Lisbon and Cascais
- A5 motorway (Romania), a planned road intended to connect Ploieşti and Albiţa and the Moldovan border
- A5 motorway (Serbia), a road in construction, connecting the A1 near Kruševac to A2 near Čačak
- A5 motorway (Slovenia), a road connecting Dragučova A1 interchange north of Maribor and Pince at the Hungarian border
- A-5 motorway (Spain), a road connecting Madrid and Badajoz, at the Portuguese border
- A5 motorway (Switzerland), a road connecting Luterbach (Solothurn) and Yverdon

== See also ==
- List of highways numbered 5
