= Juan Pujol, Argentina =

Town in Argentina

Coordinates: 30°25′06″S 57°51′27″W

Juan Pujol is a town in Argentina in the Monte Caseros Department, of Corrientes Province. It is the capital of the Municipality of 3rd Category Juan Pujol.

It has 1,487 people inhabitants.

It is named after Governor Juan Gregorio Pujol.
