= Santo Tomé Department =

Santo Tomé Department Departamento Santo Tomé (Spanish) Tetãvore Sánto Tome (Guarani)
- Department
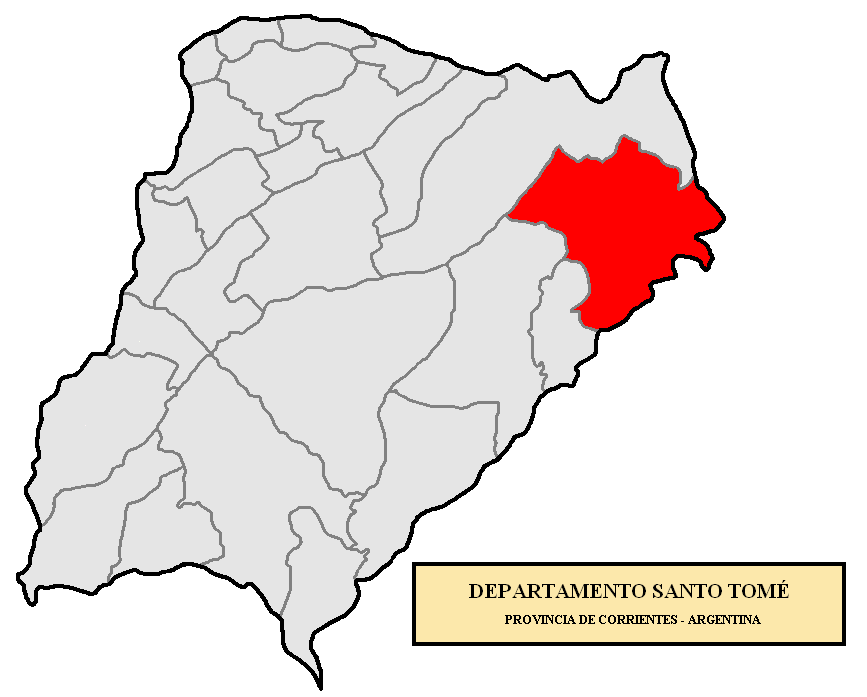
- location of Santo Tomé Department in Corrientes Province
- Coordinates: 28°33′S 56°02′W
- Country: Argentina
- Seat: Santo Tomé

Area
  - Total: 7,359 km^{2} (2,841 sq mi)

Population (2001 census [INDEC])
  - Total: 54,050
  - Density: 7.345/km^{2} (19.02/sq mi)
- Demonym: santotomeña/o
- Postal Code: W3340
- Area Code: 03756

Santo Tomé Department is a department of Corrientes Province in Argentina.

The provincial subdivision has a population of about 54,050 inhabitants in an area of 7,359 km^{2} (2,841 sq mi), and its capital city is Santo Tomé, which is located around 910 km (570 mi) from Capital Federal.

== Settlements ==
- Garruchos
- Gobernador Virasoro
- José Rafael Gómez
- Santo Tomé
