= Federación, Entre Ríos =

Federación
- City
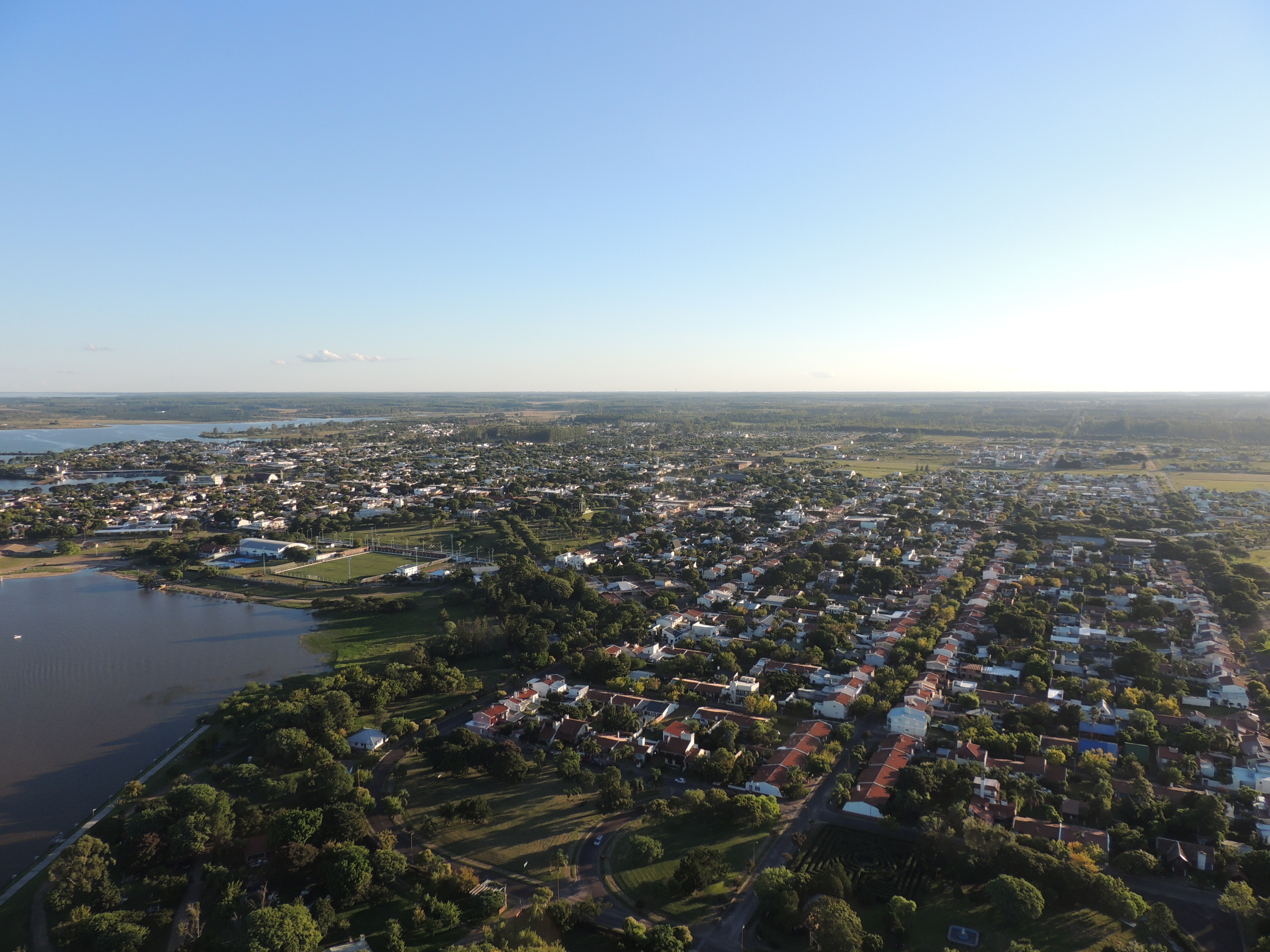
- Aerial view

- Location of Federación in Argentina
- Coordinates: 30°59′S 57°55′W
- Country: Argentina
- Province: Entre Ríos
- Department: Federación

Population (2010 census)
  - Total: 16,658
- Time zone: UTC−3 (ART)
- CPA base: E3206
- Dialing code: +54 3456

Federación is a city in the northeast of the province of Entre Ríos, Argentina. It has 16,658 inhabitants as per the 2010 census [INDEC]. It lies on the provincial and international border with Uruguay, by the reservoir of the Salto Grande Dam, on the right-hand (western) banks of the Uruguay River, about 45 km upstream from the city of Concordia and 265 km from the provincial capital Paraná, near National Route 14.

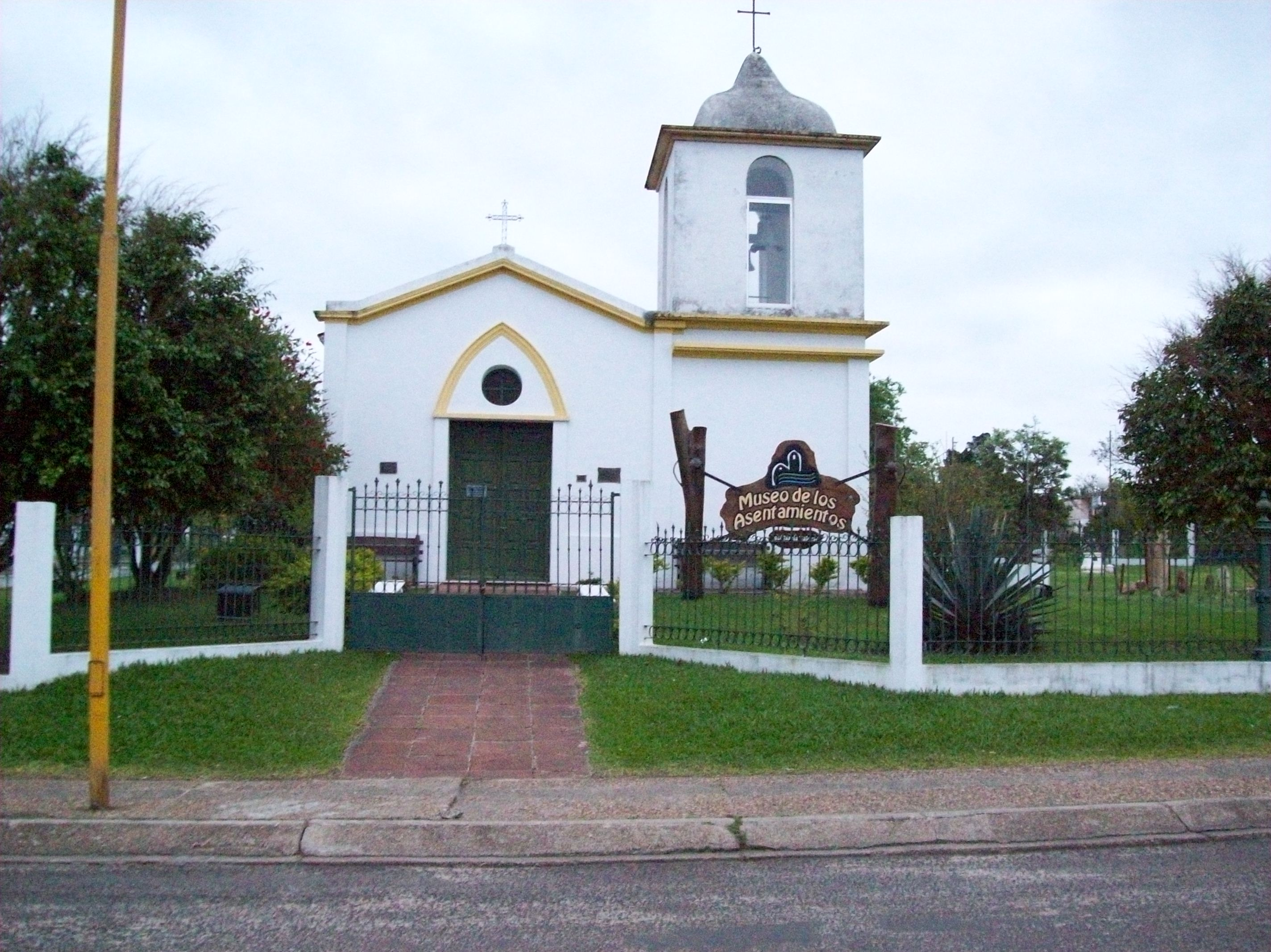
Local museum of history.

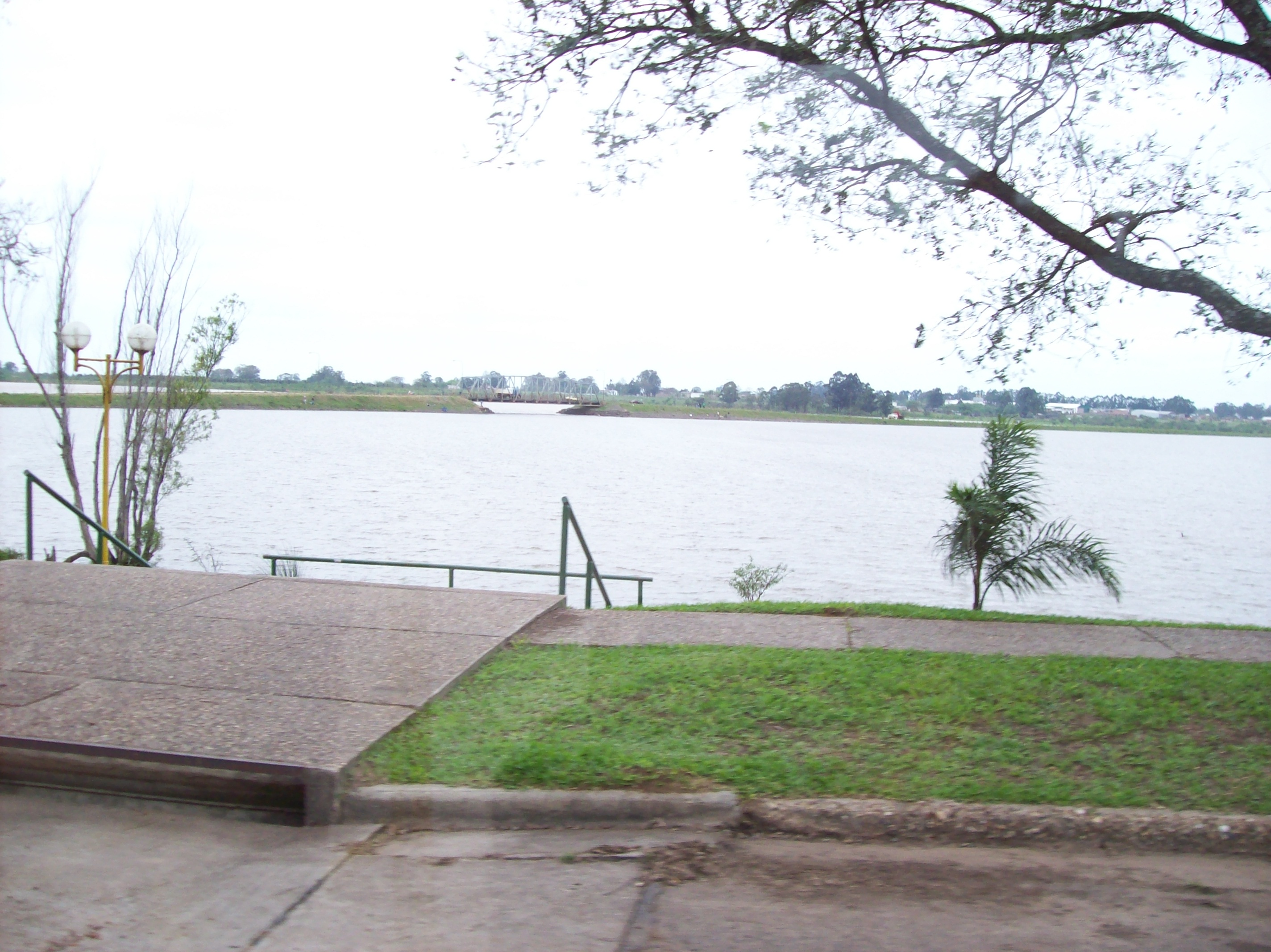
Riverwalk along the Uruguay River.

The original town was a ranch and waypost, named Mandisoví, created in 1777, which grew into a prosperous village but fell then to civil strife. A new town of Mandisoví was founded in a close location by Colonel Manuel Antonio Urdinarrain, who commanded the area, under the orders of the caudillo Justo José de Urquiza. Urdinarrain notified Urquiza about the new town and asked him to name it. Urquiza chose the name Pueblo de la Federación (Town [or People] of the Federation).

In 1974 the citizens of Federación underwent another relocation, as the latest settlement near the Uruguay River was to be flooded by the waters of Salto Grande. The city was demolished and reconstructed in two years. The new Federación was formally inaugurated in 1979 by de facto President, military dictator Jorge Rafael Videla.

The local economy is based on citrus crops and the timber industry (the city has 22 sawmills), besides small-scale beekeeping.
