= San Salvador River (Uruguay) =

Coordinates: 33°28′13″S 58°24′02″W

Location
- Country: Uruguay

The San Salvador River (Uruguay) is a river of Uruguay.

== See also ==
- List of rivers of Uruguay
