= List of highways in Argentina =

The following is a partial list of highways in Argentina, including present and past National and Provincial Routes:

== Present routes ==
Map of Argentina's national routes

Autopista Ingeniero Pascual Palazzo (Autopista Ruta Panamericana)
Justiniano Posse Freeway, Autopista Justiano Posse
East Access Freeway, Autopista Acceso Oeste
National Route A001, Avenida General Paz
National Route A002
National Route A003
National Route A004
National Route A005
National Route A006
National Route A007
National Route A009
National Route A010
National Route A011
National Route A012
National Route A014
National Route A015
National Route A016
National Route A019
National Route A023
National Route A024
National Route A025
National Route A026
National Route 1
National Route 3
National Route 5
National Route 7
National Route 8
National Route 9
National Route 11
National Route 12
National Route 14
National Route 16
National Route 18
National Route 19
National Route 20
National Route 22
National Route 23
National Route 25
National Route 26
National Route 33
National Route 34
National Route 35
National Route 36
National Route 38
National Route 40
National Route 50
National Route 51
National Route 52
National Route 60
National Route 64
National Route 65
National Route 66
National Route 68
National Route 74
National Route 75
National Route 76
National Route 77
National Route 78
National Route 79
National Route 81
National Route 86
National Route 89
National Route 95
National Route 98
National Route 101
National Route 105
National Route 117
National Route 118
National Route 119
National Route 120
National Route 121
National Route 122
National Route 123
National Route 127
National Route 130
National Route 131
National Route 135
National Route 136
National Route 141
National Route 142
National Route 143
National Route 144
National Route 145
National Route 146
National Route 147
National Route 148
National Route 149
National Route 150
National Route 151
National Route 152
National Route 153
National Route 154
National Route 157
National Route 158
National Route 168
National Route 173
National Route 174
National Route 175
National Route 177
National Route 178
National Route 188
National Route 193
National Route 205
National Route 226
National Route 228
National Route 229
National Route 231
National Route 232
National Route 234
National Route 237
National Route 242
National Route 249
National Route 250
National Route 251
National Route 252
National Route 259
National Route 260
National Route 281
National Route 288
National Route 293
North Access Freeway

== Old route designations ==
Expressway 2
National Route 2
National Route 24
National Route 53
National Route 55
National Route 56
National Route 57
National Route 59
National Route 62
National Route 63
National Route 67
National Route 90
National Route 92
National Route 93
National Route 94
National Route 103
National Route 114
National Route 126
National Route 128
National Route 129
National Route 156
National Route 166
National Route 172
National Route 191
National Route 192
National Route 195
National Route 197
National Route 200
National Route 201
National Route 202
National Route 227
National Route 240
National Route 241
National Route 243
National Route 248
National Route 253
National Route 254
National Route 256
National Route 258
National Route 270
National Route 272
National Route 273
Provincial Route 70 (Santa Fe)
Provincial Route 80 (Santa Fe)
Provincial Route 210 (Buenos Aires)
