= National Route A005 (Argentina) =

Highway in Argentina

- Ruta nacional A005

Route information
- Length: 11 km (6.8 mi)

Major junctions
- From: National Route 8
- To: National Route 36

Location
- Country: Argentina

Highway system
- Highways in Argentina

National Route A005 is an 11 km (6.8 mi)-long two-lane highway connecting National Route 8 and National Route 36 in the city of Río Cuarto, Córdoba Province, Argentina.

== Administration ==
In 1990, the Federal Government opened bids for concessions to maintain the busiest routes, dividing the different areas in Corredores Viales (road corridors). This route, part of Corredor Vial 20 was given to the Red Vial Centro company

In 2003, concession contracts were renegotiated and the route changed to Corredor Vial 4, and management was given to Caminos de América.
