= San Antonio, Misiones =

San Antonio
- Locality and municipality
- Location of the San Antonio in Misiones Province and Argentina San Antonio (Argentina)
- Coordinates: 26°3′33.37″S 53°43′55.34″W
- Country: Argentina
- Province: Misiones
- Department: General Manuel Belgrano

Government
  - Intendant: Fausto Rojas

Population (2010)
  - Total: 3,665
- Time zone: UTC−3 (ART)

San Antonio is a city in the north-eastern region of Misiones Province, Argentina, and the capital of the General Manuel Belgrano Department. It lies on the Brazilian border at 26°3′S 53°43′W. Its population was 3,665 at the 2010 census (INDEC).

The municipality contains part of the 84,000 hectares (210,000 acres) Urugua-í Provincial Park, created in 1990.
