= Monte Caseros, Corrientes =

Monte Caseros Mónte Kaséro (Guarani)
- City
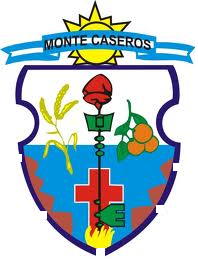
- Coat of arms

- Location of Monte Caseros in Argentina
- Coordinates: 30°15′S 57°39′W
- Country: Argentina
- Province: Corrientes
- Department: Monte Caseros

Government
  - Mayor: Eduardo Leonel Galantini (Partido Justicialista)

Population (2010 census)
  - Total: 23,470
- Time zone: UTC−3 (ART)
- CPA base: W3220
- Dialing code: +54 3775

Monte Caseros (Guarani: Mónte Kaséro) is a city in the south-east of the province of Corrientes in the Argentine Mesopotamia. It has about 37,000 inhabitants as of the 2010 census [INDEC]. It is the head town of the department of the same name, which comprises also the municipalities of Colonia Libertad, Juan Pujol and Mocoretá.

== Geography ==
The city lies on the west bank of the Uruguay River, opposite Bella Unión, Uruguay, about 440 km east-southeast of the provincial capital (Corrientes) and 640 km north of Buenos Aires.

=== Climate ===
Climate data for Monte Caseros (1991–2020, extremes 1961–present)
Month	Jan	Feb	Mar	Apr	May	Jun	Jul	Aug	Sep	Oct	Nov	Dec	Year
Record high °C (°F)	41.7 (107.1)	42.1 (107.8)	40.6 (105.1)	39.1 (102.4)	33.7 (92.7)	30.9 (87.6)	31.6 (88.9)	35.8 (96.4)	37.0 (98.6)	38.3 (100.9)	39.8 (103.6)	41.0 (105.8)	42.1 (107.8)
Mean daily maximum °C (°F)	32.4 (90.3)	31.2 (88.2)	29.6 (85.3)	25.8 (78.4)	21.7 (71.1)	19.3 (66.7)	18.9 (66.0)	21.7 (71.1)	23.1 (73.6)	25.8 (78.4)	28.7 (83.7)	31.1 (88.0)	25.8 (78.4)
Daily mean °C (°F)	26.2 (79.2)	25.1 (77.2)	23.3 (73.9)	19.9 (67.8)	16.2 (61.2)	13.9 (57.0)	13.1 (55.6)	15.1 (59.2)	17.0 (62.6)	20.0 (68.0)	22.6 (72.7)	24.9 (76.8)	19.8 (67.6)
Mean daily minimum °C (°F)	20.6 (69.1)	20.0 (68.0)	18.3 (64.9)	15.3 (59.5)	12.0 (53.6)	9.8 (49.6)	8.8 (47.8)	10.1 (50.2)	11.9 (53.4)	14.9 (58.8)	16.8 (62.2)	19.1 (66.4)	14.8 (58.6)
Record low °C (°F)	10.8 (51.4)	9.5 (49.1)	5.8 (42.4)	3.2 (37.8)	−1.2 (29.8)	−4.0 (24.8)	−3.7 (25.3)	−2.2 (28.0)	−0.1 (31.8)	3.9 (39.0)	5.9 (42.6)	7.3 (45.1)	−4.0 (24.8)
Average precipitation mm (inches)	157.4 (6.20)	140.6 (5.54)	136.8 (5.39)	197.2 (7.76)	114.7 (4.52)	82.3 (3.24)	61.7 (2.43)	64.5 (2.54)	91.9 (3.62)	157.6 (6.20)	149.1 (5.87)	167.3 (6.59)	1,521.1 (59.89)
Average precipitation days (≥ 0.1 mm)	8.8	8.1	8.0	9.1	8.4	7.6	6.4	5.6	7.8	10.3	8.1	9.1	97.2
Average relative humidity (%)	68.4	72.5	74.6	78.0	81.1	81.5	78.3	73.7	72.5	73.0	68.1	67.5	74.1
Mean monthly sunshine hours	285.9	232.7	241.8	188.9	178.1	146.7	165.0	178.6	188.8	224.8	256.9	271.5	2,594.8
Percentage possible sunshine	66	64	62	61	59	51	51	52	53	61	64	66	59
Source 1: Servicio Meteorológico Nacional
Source 2: World Meteorological Organization (sunshine hours 1981–2010), NOAA (percent sun 1961–1990)
