= National Route 118 (Argentina) =

Highway in Argentina

National Route 118
- Ruta nacional 118

Route information
- Length: 196 km (122 mi)

Major junctions
- West end: Saladas
- North end: Paraje Vallejos Cué

Location
- Country: Argentina

Highway system
- Highways in Argentina

National Route 118 is a national road in Argentina, in the northwest of Corrientes Province. It starts at the junction with National Route 12 until reaching the rural area of Paraje Vallejos Cué for a total length of 196 kilometres (122 mi). The road is marked in red in the map.

== Cities ==
The whole length of the road is within Corrientes Province, crossing through the following Departments and cities (over 5,000 people):

- Saladas Department, Saladas (km marker 5).
- San Roque Department, no cities with more than 5,000 people.
- Concepción Department, Santa Rosa (km 63) and Concepción (km 67)
- San Miguel Department, San Miguel (km 127) and Loreto (km 167)

== History ==
Originally this road was called National Route 117. By Decree #1595 of 1979, it was ceded to the administration of Corrientes Province. Decree 1715 from 1988 annuls the previous decree and this road became National Route 118 as number 117 had been used on another road near Paso de los Libres in the SE of the province.
