= Bernardo de Irigoyen, Misiones =

Bernardo de Irigoyen
- City
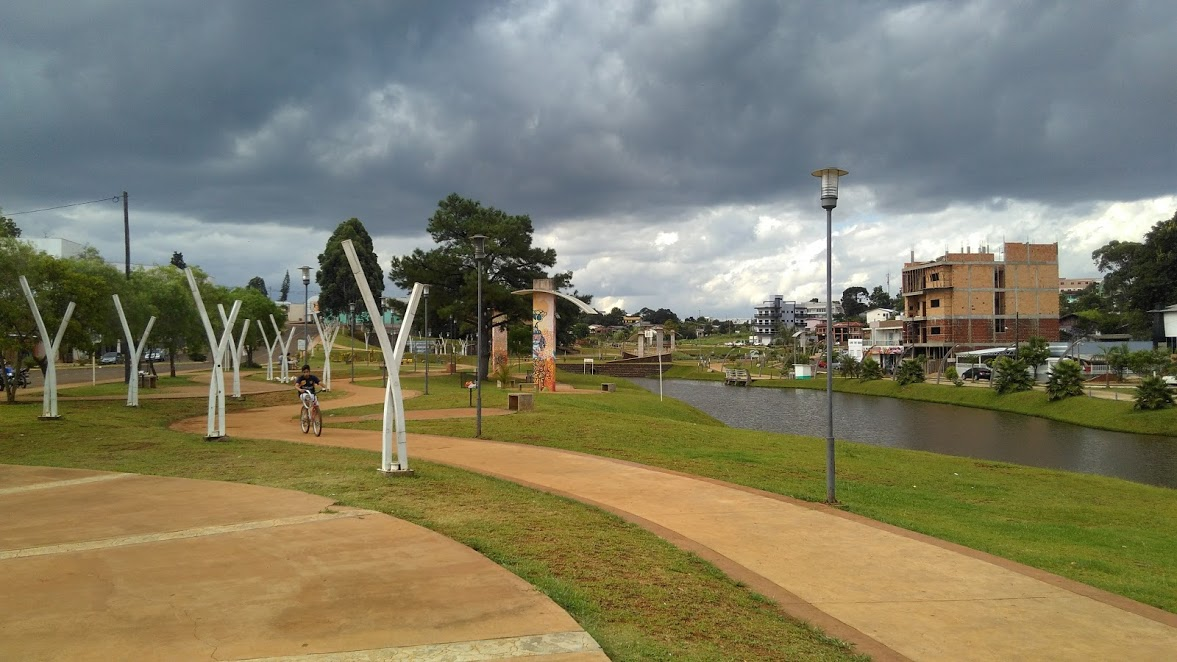

- Location of Bernardo de Irigoyen in Argentina Bernardo de Irigoyen (Argentina)
- Coordinates: 26°15′19″S 53°38′49″W
- Country: Argentina
- Province: Misiones
- Department: General Manuel Belgrano

Government
  - Intendant: Edgardo Nemesio Aquino

Area
  - Total: 1,064 km^{2} (411 sq mi)
- Elevation: 835 m (2,740 ft)

Population (2001 census)
  - Total: 10,889
  - Density: 10.23/km^{2} (26.51/sq mi)
- Time zone: UTC−3 (ART)
- CPA base: N3366
- Dialing code: +54 3741

Bernardo de Irigoyen is a city in the province of Misiones, Argentina. It has 10,889 inhabitants as per the 2001 census [INDEC], and is the head town of the General Manuel Belgrano Department. It carries the name of prominent politician and diplomat Bernardo de Irigoyen. The city is the easternmost point of Argentina.

== Geography ==
=== Location ===
The city is located in the easternmost point of Argentina, on the border with Brazil, next to Dionísio Cerqueira (state of Santa Catarina) and Barracão (state of Paraná), an important entrance to the country. It lies on Barracón Hill, at an altitude of 835 m, the highest point in Misiones, by National Route 14, which connects the Argentine Mesopotamia with other regions.

The municipality contains part of the 84,000 hectares (210,000 acres) Urugua-í Provincial Park, created in 1990.

=== Climate ===
Bernardo de Irigoyen has a humid subtropical climate with abundant rainfall in every season (Cfa in Köppen climate classification), closely bordering a subtropical highland climate (Cfb) as the hottest month averages exactly 22 °C or 71.6 °F). Due to its elevation, it has the coolest climate among the cities of Misiones province, with an annual mean of 18.3 °C or 64.9 °F.

Climate data for Bernardo de Irigoyen, Misiones (1991–2020, extremes 1984–present)
Month	Jan	Feb	Mar	Apr	May	Jun	Jul	Aug	Sep	Oct	Nov	Dec	Year
Record high °C (°F)	35.3 (95.5)	34.3 (93.7)	35.7 (96.3)	31.2 (88.2)	29.1 (84.4)	26.3 (79.3)	27.3 (81.1)	31.8 (89.2)	35.3 (95.5)	35.2 (95.4)	33.7 (92.7)	34.7 (94.5)	35.7 (96.3)
Mean daily maximum °C (°F)	28.1 (82.6)	27.6 (81.7)	26.9 (80.4)	24.4 (75.9)	20.6 (69.1)	19.3 (66.7)	19.6 (67.3)	22.1 (71.8)	23.3 (73.9)	25.0 (77.0)	26.3 (79.3)	27.5 (81.5)	24.2 (75.6)
Daily mean °C (°F)	22.9 (73.2)	22.6 (72.7)	21.7 (71.1)	19.6 (67.3)	16.2 (61.2)	15.2 (59.4)	14.9 (58.8)	16.9 (62.4)	18.0 (64.4)	19.8 (67.6)	21.0 (69.8)	22.5 (72.5)	19.3 (66.7)
Mean daily minimum °C (°F)	19.0 (66.2)	18.8 (65.8)	17.9 (64.2)	15.9 (60.6)	12.9 (55.2)	11.9 (53.4)	11.2 (52.2)	12.8 (55.0)	13.8 (56.8)	15.6 (60.1)	16.5 (61.7)	18.3 (64.9)	15.4 (59.7)
Record low °C (°F)	9.8 (49.6)	9.1 (48.4)	5.9 (42.6)	1.7 (35.1)	−1.0 (30.2)	−1.7 (28.9)	−3.7 (25.3)	−3.1 (26.4)	−0.5 (31.1)	2.5 (36.5)	3.9 (39.0)	7.7 (45.9)	−3.7 (25.3)
Average precipitation mm (inches)	207.1 (8.15)	189.1 (7.44)	181.0 (7.13)	173.9 (6.85)	196.1 (7.72)	185.5 (7.30)	135.2 (5.32)	106.4 (4.19)	198.1 (7.80)	277.9 (10.94)	194.8 (7.67)	204.5 (8.05)	2,249.6 (88.57)
Average precipitation days (≥ 0.1 mm)	13.5	12.8	11.8	9.0	10.2	10.3	9.2	7.9	10.3	13.1	10.2	12.8	131.1
Average snowy days	0.0	0.0	0.0	0.0	0.0	0.0	0.1	0.0	0.0	0.0	0.0	0.0	0.1
Average relative humidity (%)	77.6	78.6	77.9	77.7	79.0	79.8	74.5	67.4	70.4	75.3	72.1	75.2	75.5
Mean monthly sunshine hours	229.4	200.6	213.9	204.0	179.8	159.0	186.0	207.7	180.0	192.0	231.0	229.4	2,412.8
Mean daily sunshine hours	7.4	7.1	6.9	6.8	5.8	5.3	6.0	6.7	6.0	6.2	7.7	7.4	6.6
Percentage possible sunshine	51.7	47.6	53.9	55.8	58.6	48.3	55.9	57.9	46.2	45.0	58.8	52.9	52.7
Source 1: Servicio Meteorológico Nacional (percent sun 1991–2000)
Source 2: Secretaria de Mineria
