= Monte Caseros Department =

Monte Caseros Department Departamento Monte Caseros (Spanish) Tetãvore Mónte Kaséro (Guarani)
- Department
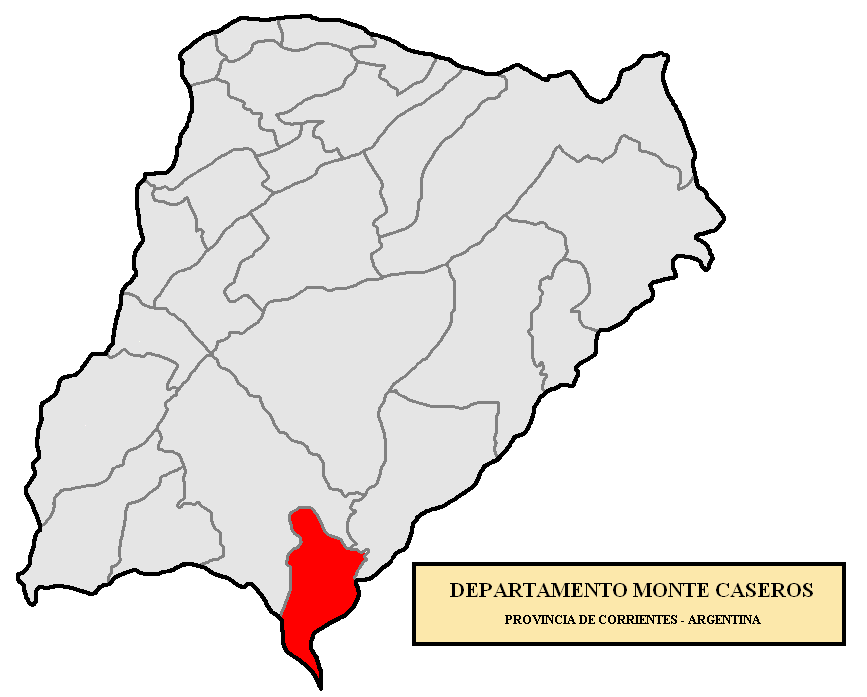
- location of Monte Caseros Department in Corrientes Province
- Coordinates: 30°15′S 57°38′W
- Country: Argentina
- Seat: Monte Caseros

Area
  - Total: 2,287 km^{2} (883 sq mi)

Population (2001 census [INDEC])
  - Total: 33,684
  - Density: 14.73/km^{2} (38.15/sq mi)
- Demonym: casereña/o
- Postal Code: W3220
- Area Code: 03775
- Website: www.montecaseros.gov.ar

Monte Caseros Department is a department of Corrientes Province in Argentina.

The provincial subdivision has a population of about 33,684 inhabitants in an area of 2,287 km^{2} (883 sq mi), and its capital city is Monte Caseros, which is located around 630 km (390 mi) from Capital Federal.

== Settlements ==
- Colonia Libertad
- Juan Pujol
- Mocoretá
- Monte Caseros
