= Gobernador Virasoro =

- City
- Location of Gobernador Virasoro in Argentina
- Coordinates: 28°3′S 56°2′W
- Country: Argentina
- Province: Corrientes
- Department: Santo Tomé

Government
  - Mayor: Blanca Pinto (UCR)

Area
  - Total: 2,100 km^{2} (810 sq mi)
- Elevation: 127 m (417 ft)

Population (2010 census)
  - Total: 30,666
  - Density: 15/km^{2} (38/sq mi)
- Time zone: UTC−3 (ART)
- CPA base: W3342
- Dialing code: +54 3756

Gobernador Virasoro (formally Gobernador Ingeniero Valentín Virasoro) is a city in Argentina in the province of Corrientes, located in the "Argentine Mesopotamia". It had about 30,000 inhabitants at the 2010 census [INDEC].

The city lies in the north-east of the province, 64 km north from the city of Santo Tomé and 90 km from Posadas, Misiones, on National Route 14. The Iberá Wetlands are located 80 km to the west.

Gobernador Virasoro as such was founded on 23 September 1926. The original settlement, called Villa Vuelta del Ombú since the time the Jesuits established a ranch there, was renamed in homage to Valentín Virasoro, a field engineer who measured terrains and studied the Iberá lagoon and wetlands working for the provincial government.
