= San José, Misiones =

San José
- Municipality and village
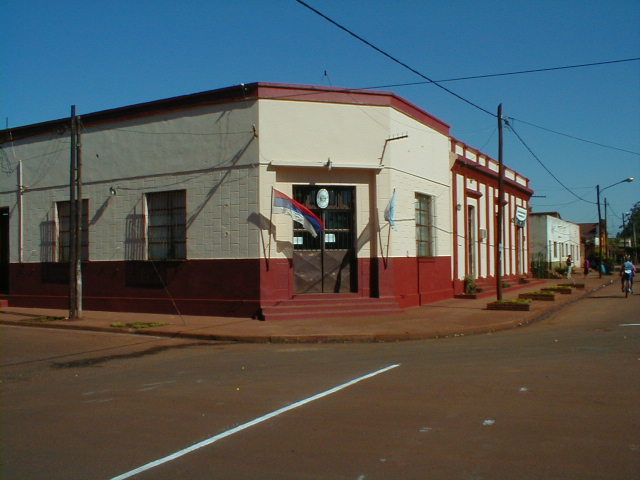

- Location within Misiones Province Location within Argentina
- Country: Argentina
- Province: Misiones Province

Government
  - Intendant: Jorge Tenaschuk
- Time zone: UTC−3 (ART)

San José is a village and municipality in Misiones Province in north-eastern Argentina.
