= Ituzaingó, Corrientes =

Ituzaingó Ytusãingo (Guarani)
- City
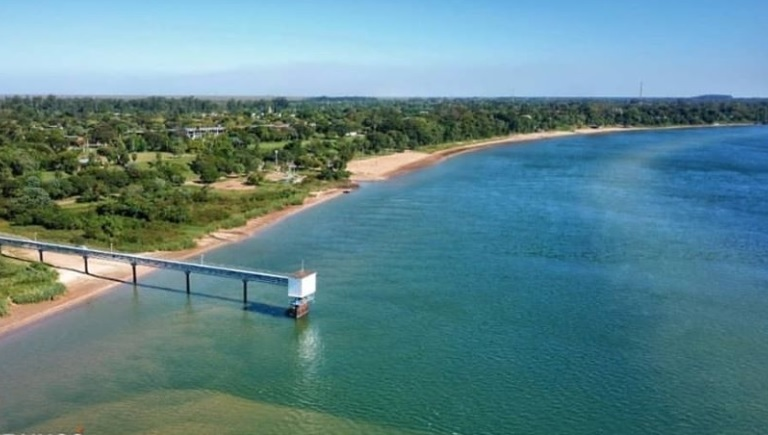
- Ituzaingó, Argentina

- Location of Ituzaingó in Argentina
- Coordinates: 27°36′S 56°40′W
- Country: Argentina
- Province: Corrientes
- Department: Ituzaingó
- Elevation: 62 m (203 ft)

Population (2010)
  - Total: 19,575
- Demonym: Ituzaingueña/o
- Time zone: UTC−3 (ART)
- CPA base: W3302
- Dialing code: +54 3786

Ituzaingó (Guarani: Ytusãingo) is a city in Corrientes Province, Argentina, at the Argentina–Paraguay border.

The Yacyretá Dam is nearby.

== Climate ==
Climate data for Ituzaingó, Corrientes (extremes 1963–2016)
Month	Jan	Feb	Mar	Apr	May	Jun	Jul	Aug	Sep	Oct	Nov	Dec	Year
Record high °C (°F)	40.5 (104.9)	40.5 (104.9)	39.5 (103.1)	36.0 (96.8)	34.0 (93.2)	30.5 (86.9)	37.3 (99.1)	35.0 (95.0)	37.5 (99.5)	37.5 (99.5)	41.0 (105.8)	41.0 (105.8)	41.0 (105.8)
Mean daily maximum °C (°F)	32.5 (90.5)	31.7 (89.1)	29.8 (85.6)	27.0 (80.6)	24.7 (76.5)	21.8 (71.2)	21.8 (71.2)	22.8 (73.0)	23.5 (74.3)	27.2 (81.0)	28.9 (84.0)	31.2 (88.2)	26.9 (80.4)
Daily mean °C (°F)	26.3 (79.3)	25.7 (78.3)	24.5 (76.1)	21.0 (69.8)	18.0 (64.4)	16.0 (60.8)	15.9 (60.6)	17.3 (63.1)	19.0 (66.2)	21.3 (70.3)	23.7 (74.7)	25.5 (77.9)	21.2 (70.2)
Mean daily minimum °C (°F)	19.7 (67.5)	19.9 (67.8)	18.0 (64.4)	14.8 (58.6)	12.6 (54.7)	10.4 (50.7)	10.6 (51.1)	11.1 (52.0)	12.8 (55.0)	15.5 (59.9)	17.6 (63.7)	18.6 (65.5)	15.1 (59.2)
Record low °C (°F)	10.2 (50.4)	9.9 (49.8)	5.9 (42.6)	3.0 (37.4)	−0.7 (30.7)	−1.4 (29.5)	−1.0 (30.2)	−0.5 (31.1)	0.7 (33.3)	6.7 (44.1)	9.0 (48.2)	10.4 (50.7)	−1.4 (29.5)
Average precipitation mm (inches)	183 (7.2)	144 (5.7)	122 (4.8)	128 (5.0)	62 (2.4)	101 (4.0)	80 (3.1)	94 (3.7)	118 (4.6)	206 (8.1)	153 (6.0)	164 (6.5)	1,555 (61.2)
Source 1: Secretaria de Mineria
Source 2: Servicio Meteorológico Nacional (extremes)
