= Ituzaingó Department =

Ituzaingó Department Departamento Ituzaingó (Spanish) Tetãvore Ytusãingo (Guarani)
- Department
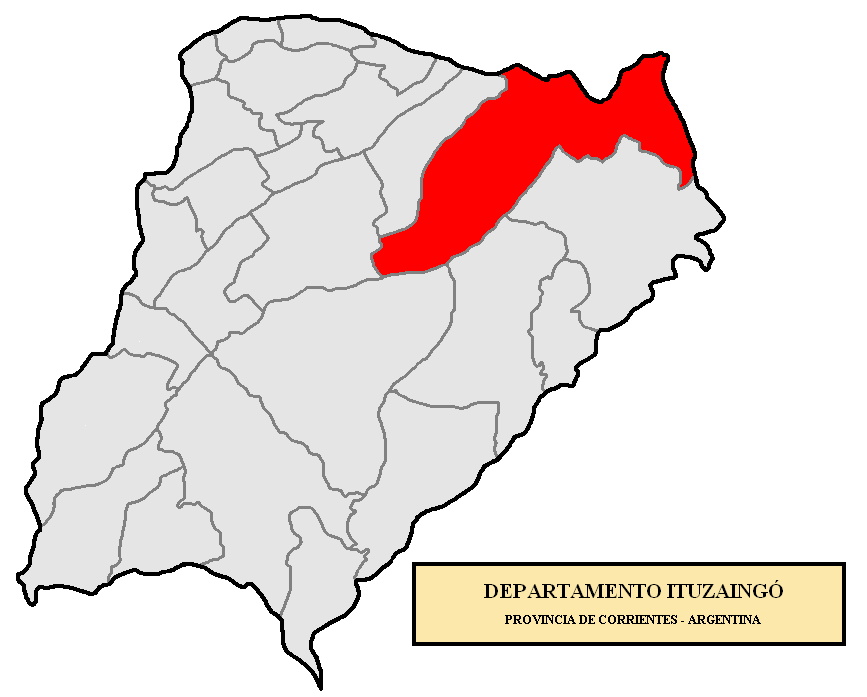
- location of Ituzaingó Department in Corrientes Province
- Coordinates: 27°36′S 56°40′W
- Country: Argentina
- Seat: Ituzaingó

Area
  - Total: 8,613 km^{2} (3,325 sq mi)

Population (2001 census [INDEC])
  - Total: 30,565
  - Density: 3.549/km^{2} (9.191/sq mi)
- Postal Code: W3302
- Area Code: 03786

Ituzaingó Department is a department of Corrientes Province in Argentina.

The provincial subdivision has a population of about 30,565 inhabitants in an area of 8,613 km^{2} (3,325 sq mi), and its capital city is Ituzaingó, which is located around 1,070 km (660 mi) from Capital Federal.

It is the place where the Yacyretá dam is located.

== Settlements ==
- Colonia Liebig's
- Ituzaingó
- San Antonio
- San Carlos
- Villa Olivari
