= Uruguay River =

River in South America

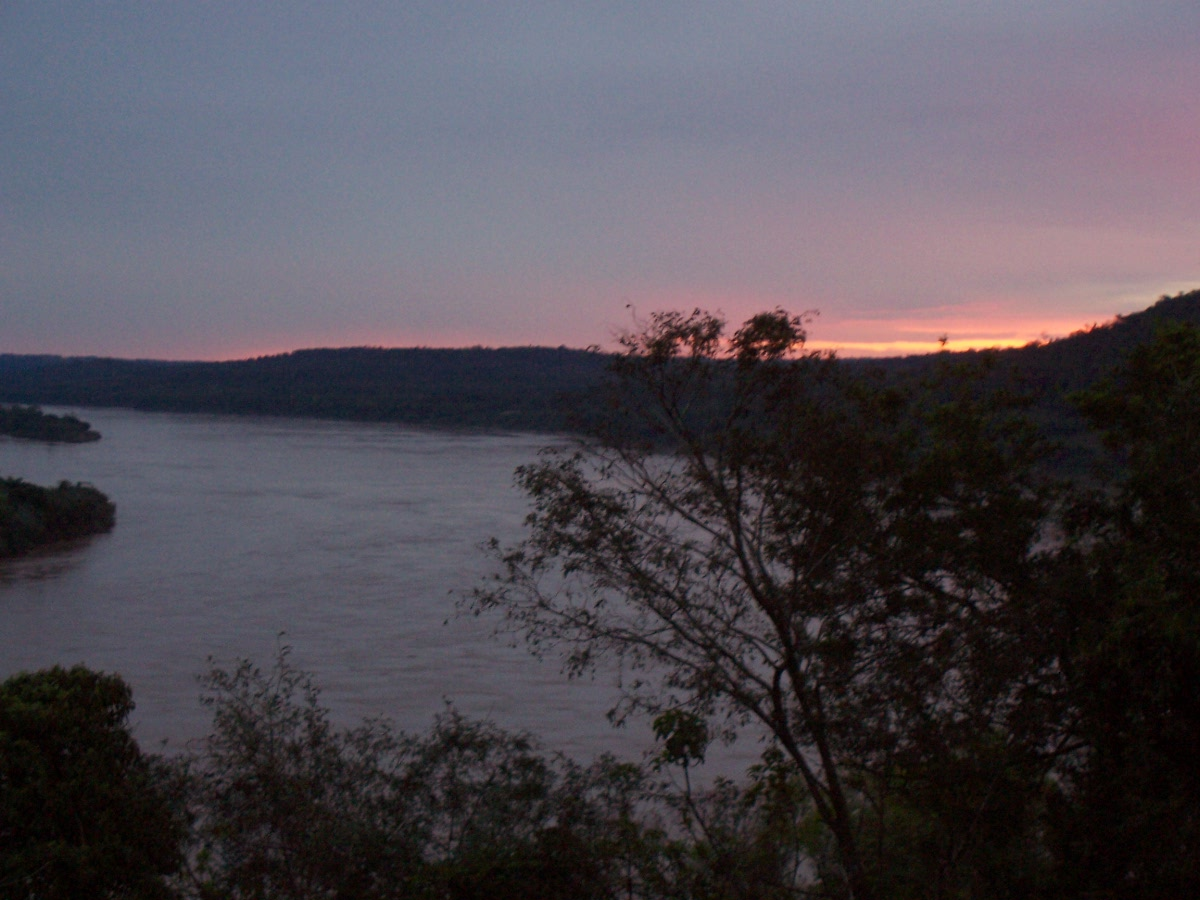
- Sunset in the Uruguay River, from Misiones, Argentina

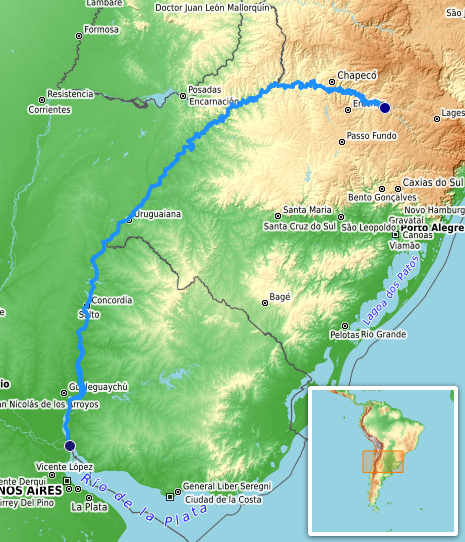
- Map of the Uruguay River
- Native name: Río Uruguay (Spanish); Rio Uruguai (Portuguese)

Location
- Countries: Argentina; Brazil; Uruguay

Physical characteristics
- Source: Pelotas River
  - location: Serra Geral, Brazil
  - elevation: 1,800 m (5,900 ft)
- 2nd source: Canoas River
  - location: Serra Geral, Brazil
- Mouth: Río de la Plata
  - location: Argentina, Uruguay
  - coordinates: 34°12′S 58°18′W
  - elevation: 0 m (0 ft)
- Length: 1,838 km (1,142 mi)
- Basin size: 365,000 km^{2} (141,000 mi^{2})
- Discharge
  - location: Nueva Palmira (near mouth)
  - average: (Period 1971–2010)7,058 m^{3}/s (249,300 cu ft/s)
- Discharge
  - location: Concordia, Salto Grande
  - average: (Period 1971–2010)5,725 m^{3}/s (202,200 cu ft/s)
- Discharge
  - location: Paso de los Libres
  - average: (Period 1971–2010)4,789 m^{3}/s (169,100 cu ft/s)
- Discharge
  - location: El Soberbio
  - average: (Period 1971–2010)2,384 m^{3}/s (84,200 cu ft/s)

Basin features
- Progression: Río de la Plata → Atlantic Ocean
- River system: Río de la Plata
- Tributaries
  - left: Pelotas, Inhandava, Apuaê, Passo Fundo, Rio da Várzea, Guarita, Turvo, Buricá, Ijuí, Piratini, Icamaquã, Ibicuí, Cuareim, Arapey Grande, Queguay Grande, Daymán, Negro, San Salvador
  - right: Canoas, Peixe, Irani, Chapecó, Das Antas, Pepiri-Guazu, Arroyo Yabotí, Aguapey, Miriñay, Mocoretá, Gualeguaychú

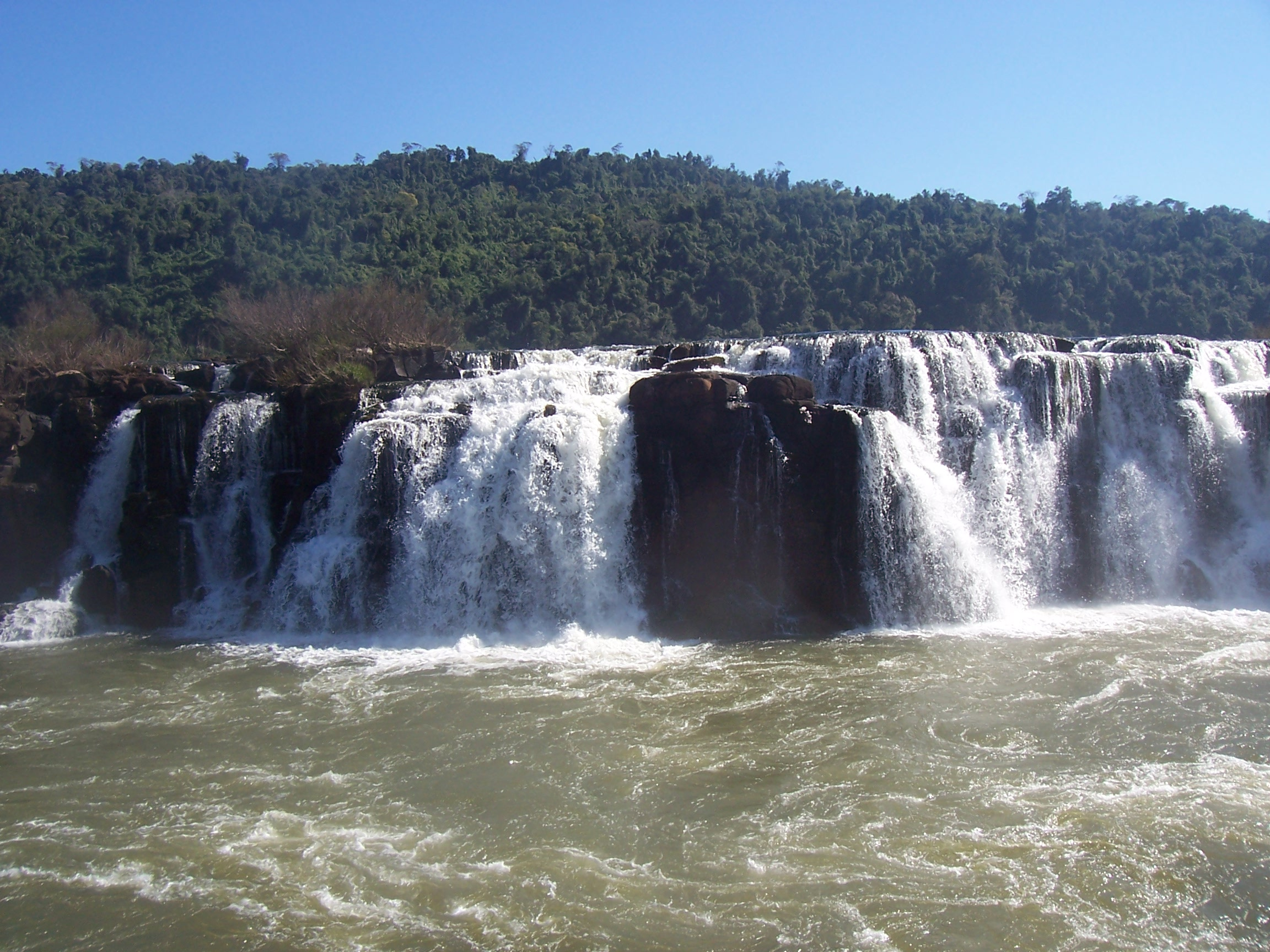
The Moconá Falls (also known as the Yucumã Falls), where the river passes between Argentina and Brazil, are up to 3 km wide

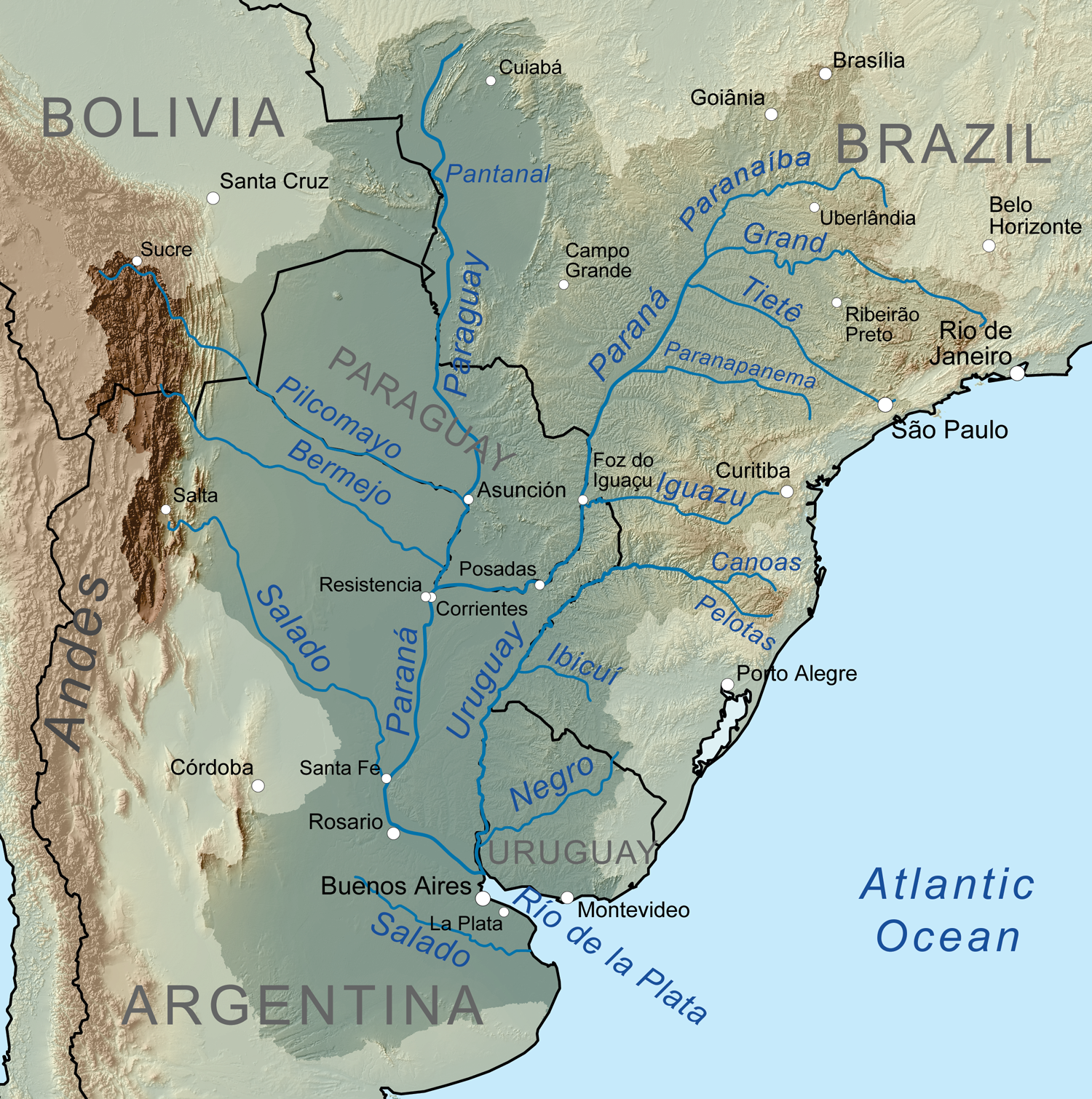
Map of the Rio de la Plata Basin, showing the Uruguay River joining the Paraná near Buenos Aires

The Uruguay River (Spanish: Río Uruguay [ˈri.o wɾuˈɣwaj]; Portuguese: Rio Uruguai [ˈʁi.u uɾuˈɡwaj]) is a major river in South America. It flows from north to south and forms parts of the boundaries of Brazil, Argentina and Uruguay, separating some of the Argentine provinces of the Mesopotamia from the other two countries. It passes between the states of Santa Catarina and Rio Grande do Sul in Brazil; forms the eastern border of the provinces of Misiones, Corrientes and Entre Ríos in Argentina; and makes up the western borders of the departments of Artigas, Salto, Paysandú, Río Negro, Soriano and Colonia in Uruguay.

== Etymology ==
The name of the river comes from the Spanish settlers' interpretation of the Guaraní language word the inhabitants of the region used to designate it. There are several interpretations, including "the river of the uru (an indigenous bird)", and "[river of] the uruguá" (an indigenous gastropod, Pomella megastoma).

== Course ==
The river measures about 1,838 km (1,142 mi) in length and starts in the Serra do Mar in Brazil, where the Canoas River and the Pelotas River are joined, at about 200 metres (660 ft) above mean sea level. At this stage, the river goes through uneven, broken terrain, forming rapids and falls. Its course through Rio Grande do Sul is not navigable.

An unusual feature of the Uruguay River is a submerged canyon. This canyon formed during the Ice Age, when the climate was drier and the river was narrower. Its depth is up to 100 metres (330 ft) below the bottom of the river channel and it is one-eighth to one-third as wide as the river. The canyon is only visible in two places, one of which is the Moconá Falls (also called the Yucumã Falls). However, the falls are not visible for 150 days per year and become more like rapids when they are not visible. Unlike most waterfalls, the Moconá Falls are parallel to the river, not perpendicular. The falls are 10 metres (33 ft) to 12 metres (39 ft) high and between 1,800 metres (5,900 ft) and 3,000 metres (9,800 ft) wide. They are 1,215 km (755 mi) from the mouth of the river. The 17,491 ha (43,220 acres) Turvo State Park, created in 1947, protects the Brazilian side of the falls.

Together with the Paraná River, the Uruguay forms the Río de la Plata estuary. It is navigable from around Salto Chico. Its main tributary is the Río Negro, which is born in the south of Brazil and goes through Uruguay for 500 km until its confluence with the Uruguay River, which is located 100 km north of the Uruguay's confluence with the Río de la Plata, in Punta Gorda, Colonia Department, Uruguay.

The river is crossed by five international bridges called (from north to south): Integration Bridge and Paso de los Libres-Uruguaiana International Bridge, between Argentina and Brazil; and the Salto Grande Bridge, General Artigas Bridge and Libertador General San Martín Bridge between Argentina and Uruguay.

The drainage basin of the Uruguay River has an area of 365,000 km^{2} (141,000 mi^{2}). Its main economic use is the generation of hydroelectricity and it is dammed in its lower portion by the Salto Grande Dam and by the Itá Dam upstream in Brazil.

== Discharge ==
Average monthly discharge at Salto Grande:

Year	Average discharge (m^{3}/s)												
Year	JAN	FEB	MAR	APR	MAY	JUN	JUL	AUG	SEP	OCT	NOV	DEC	Average
2014	4,652	3,858	3,910	4,277	7,104	8,332	16,199	5,065	7,298	12,873	5,862	6,241	7,139.2
2015	13,471	4,543	3,622	2,450	2,450	5,945	11,865	7,855	3,731	14,948	13,155	18,559	8,549.5
2016	10,690	5,206	4,569	13,535	6,758	4,204	5,609	3,098	3,947	6,937	6,931	2,630	6,176.2
2017	6,231	4,885	5,680	8,712	13,748	21,136	3,684	5,865	5,801	7,537	3,588	1,971	7,399
2018	3,086	2,902	2,397	3,137	5,355	2,784	4,057	2,478	6,071	8,208	8,044	6,714	4,602.7
2019	16,384	4,850	5,264	3,647	10,389	6,650	4,066	4,395	2,549	4,066	8,687	3,628	5,774.7
2020	1,459	1,679	831	581	2,315	5,056	7,318	3,893	3,418	1,785	700	2,079	2,592.8
2021	5,570	939	1,734	1,724	4,589	4,975	2,017	1,801	4,499	4,373	1,229	1,283	2,894.4
2022	5,665	986	6,363	9,211	10,098	2,896	2,513	482	472	7,671	2,035	7,105	4,624.7
2023	569	677	1,435	1,082	2,707	9,778	6,388	3,451	11,210	16,536	22,898	14,101	7,569.3
2024	7,714	3,394	7,826	9,473	18,397	8,339	7,815	5,382	4,260	7,862	7,862	516	7,403.3
2025	1,224	1,735	1,291	2,237	4,946	13,913	9,652	6,449	9,965	8,478	8,478	3,657	6,002.1
Source: Comisión Nacional de Energía Atómica
1980–2020	3,962	3,786	3,799	5,524	6,373	6,548	6,506	5,263	5,212	7,726	6,866	4,360	5,494
Source: Salto Grande

Mean annual discharge at Salto Grande (1980–2025), (31°16′32.8008″S 57°56′19.3884″W):

2003–2025
Year	Average discharge (m^{3}/s)
2025	5,675
2024	7,413
2023	7,071
2022	4,526
2021	2,871
2020	2,589
2019	6,201
2018	4,569
2017	7,598
2016	6,140
2015	8,665
2014	7,280
2013	5,491
2012	2,893
2011	4,976
2010	5,627
2009	5,459
2008	3,783
2007	5,288
2006	2,136
2005	5,000
2004	2,923
2003	5,530

1980–2002
Year	Average discharge (m^{3}/s)
2002	8,694
2001	6,333
2000	4,715
1999	3,412
1998	10,658
1997	6,776
1996	4,417
1995	3,296
1994	5,772
1993	5,535
1992	6,975
1991	3,174
1990	7,897
1989	3,810
1988	2,983
1987	6,598
1986	7,025
1985	5,434
1984	7,145
1983	9,479
1982	6,339
1981	2,717
1980	4,370

Multiannual average discharge:

1971–2010
Location	Average discharge (m^{3}/s)
Nueva Palmira	7,058
Salto Grande	5,725
Paso de los Libres	4,789
El Soberbio	2,384

== Tributaries ==
The main tributaries from the mouth:

Left tributary	Right tributary	Length (km)	Basin size (km^{2})	Average discharge (m^{3}/s)^{*}
Uruguay		1,838	353,451	7,562.4
Lower Uruguay
San Salvador		100	3,072.1	52.5
Negro		903	71,154	952.1
	Guale-guaychú	268	6,935.8	84
Arroyo Negro			2,271.2	37.9
Queguay Grande		280	8,596	157.7
Daymán		210	3,415	63.3
Middle Uruguay
Arroyo Itapebí Grande			1,042.2	19.1
Arapey Grande		240	11,996	234.9
Arroyo Yacuy			1,089.5	20.6
	Mocoretá	140	3,783.3	59.3
Cuareim		351	14,641	326.5
	Miriñay	285	12,473.6	168.2
Arroio Touro Passo			991.9	22.7
	Guaviraví		1,765.8	34.7
Ibicuí		673	47,203.4	1,113.1
	Aguapey	310	7,088.2	163.6
Icamaquã		250	4,886.7	132.3
Piratini		120	5,611	152.4
Ijuí		300	10,794	307
Comandaí		199	1,418	40
Santo Cristo		121.7	899.2	24.2
Santa Rosa		185.1	1,401.5	38.9
Buricá		195.5	2,356.2	66.4
	Arroyo Soberbio	133.1	1,084.7	23.7
Turvo		247.1	1,877.7	53.2
	Arroyo Yabotí		2,002.4	53.4
Upper Uruguay
	Pepiri Guazú	180	2,345.6	74.4
Guarita		242	2,234	66.8
	Rio das Antes	194	2,706.1	81.7
Rio da Várzea		165	5,480.5	183.8
	Chapecó	248	8,364.1	284.1
Passo Fundo		200	4,055	135.7
	Irani	223	1,586.5	50.1
	Jacutinga	168	1,003.2	29.8
	Peixe	299	5,286.8	143.7
Apauê		210	3,729.8	124.7
Inhandava		181.7	2,406	73.5
Pelotas		437	13,378.4	343.5
	Canoas	572	14,883.7	308.8

^{*} Period: 1971–2000

== Cellulose plant conflict ==
Argentina and Uruguay experienced a conflict over the construction of pulp mills on the Uruguay River. Two European companies, ENCE and Botnia, proposed building cellulose processing plants at Fray Bentos, Uruguay, opposite Gualeguaychú, Argentina. According to a 1975 treaty, Argentina and Uruguay were supposed to jointly agree on matters relating to the Uruguay River. Argentina alleged that Uruguay broke the treaty. Additionally, Argentina believed the Finnish company Botnia was polluting the fish and the overall environment of the river while Uruguay believed that the plant was not depositing a large amount of toxins in the Uruguay River.

Starting in April 2005, residents of Gualeguaychú, as well as many others, protested, claiming that the plants would pollute the river shared by the two countries. Early in 2006, the conflict escalated into a diplomatic crisis, compelling one of the companies move the project 250 kilometres (160 mi) south. Beginning in December 2005, the international bridges linking the Argentine province of Entre Ríos with Uruguay were intermittently blockaded by Argentine protesters, causing major disruptions in commercial traffic and tourism.

In 2006, Argentina brought the dispute before the International Court of Justice. The ICJ completed hearings between Argentina and Uruguay regarding the dispute on October 2, 2009. In 2010, the court ruled that although Uruguay failed to inform Argentina of the construction of the pulp mills, the mills did not pollute the river, so closing the remaining pulp mill would be unjustified. Later in 2010, Argentina and Uruguay created a joint commission to coordinate activities on the river.

== Links across the Uruguay ==
The course of the Uruguay is crossed by the following bridges, beginning upstream:

Crossing	Location	Built	Carries	Coordinates
Brazil
Campos Novos–Barracão Bridge	Campos Novos–Barracão		BR-470	27°36′12.1″S 51°28′10.6″W
Machadinho Dam	Piratuba–Maximiliano de Almeida	2002		27°31′31.8″S 51°47′15.7″W
Marcelino Ramos Railway Bridge	Alto Bela Vista–Marcelino Ramos			27°27′54.8″S 51°54′02.3″W
Concórdia–Marcelino Ramos Bridge	Concórdia–Marcelino Ramos		BR-153	27°22′32.8″S 51°59′11.2″W
Itá Dam	Itá–Aratiba		SC-155 / RS-420	27°15′51.9″S 52°22′53.8″W
Chapecó–Nonoai Bridge	Chapecó–Nonoai		SC-480	27°17′02.4″S 52°41′32″W
Foz de Chapecó Dam	Águas de Chapecó–Alpestre			27°08′23.1″S 53°02′37.2″W
Palmitos–Iraí Bridge	Palmitos–Iraí		BR-158	27°10′21.7″S 53°13′42.8″W
Brazil–Argentina
Alba Posse–Porto Mauá Bridge	Alba Posse–Porto Mauá	Planned		
San Javier–Porto Xavier Bridge	San Javier–Porto Xavier	Planned		
Integration Bridge	Santo Tomé–São Borja	1997	National Route 121 / BR-285	28°36′40.5″S 56°00′51.1″W
Alvear-Itaqui Bridge	Alvear–Itaqui	Planned		
Agustín P. Justo-Getúlio Vargas International Bridge	Paso de los Libres–Uruguaiana	1945	National Route 117 / BR-290	29°44′36.5″S 57°05′34.1″W
Argentina–Uruguay
Monte Caseros–Bella Unión Bridge	Monte Caseros–Bella Unión	Planned		
Salto Grande Bridge	Concordia–Salto	1982	National Route A015 / Acceso Puente Internacional	31°16′30″S 57°56′18.2″W
General Artigas Bridge	Colón–Paysandú	1975	National Route 135 / Avenida de las Américas	32°15′52.7″S 58°06′01.4″W
Libertador General San Martín Bridge	Gualeguaychú–Fray Bentos	1976	National Route 136 / Acceso Puente Internacional	33°05′55.7″S 58°14′55.5″W
Zárate–Nueva Palmira	Zárate–Nueva Palmira	Planned		

== See also ==
- List of rivers of the Americas
- Geography of Uruguay
- Tributaries of the Río de la Plata
