= General Manuel Belgrano Department =

General Manuel Belgrano Departamento General Manuel Belgrano
- Department
- Interactive map of General Manuel Belgrano
- Country: Argentina
- Seat: Bernardo de Irigoyen

Area
  - Total: 3,275 km^{2} (1,264 sq mi)

Population (2022)
  - Total: 45,570
  - Density: 13.91/km^{2} (36.04/sq mi)

General Manuel Belgrano is a department of Misiones Province (Argentina).
