= Santo Tomé, Corrientes =

Santo Tomé Sánto Tome (Guarani)
- City
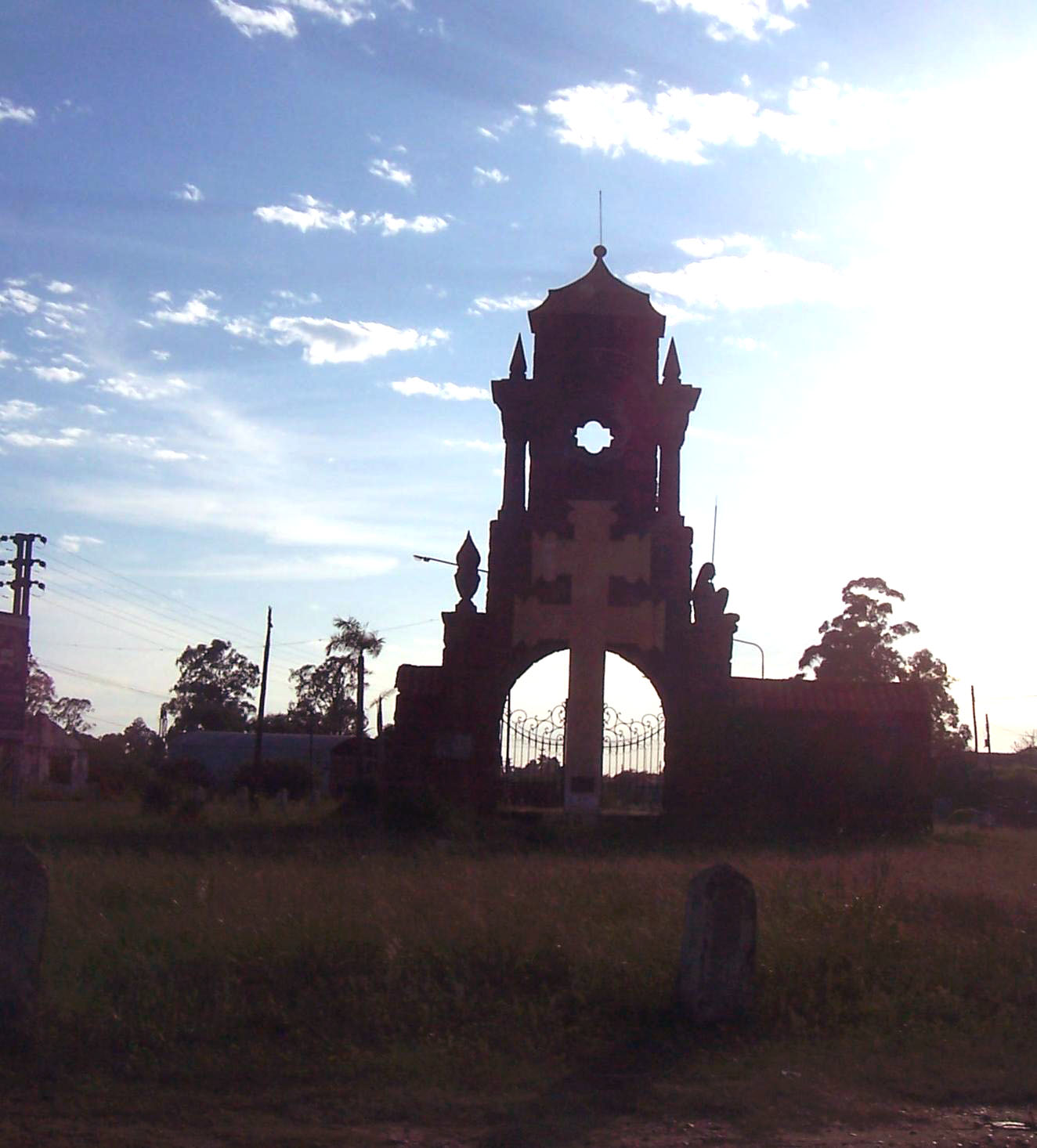
- Gates of the city

- Location of Santo Tomé in Argentina
- Coordinates: 28°33′S 56°3′W
- Country: Argentina
- Province: Corrientes
- Department: Santo Tomé

Government
  - Mayor: José Augusto Suaid (Radical Civic Union)

Population (2010 census)
  - Total: 23,299
- Demonym: santotomeño
- Time zone: UTC−3 (ART)
- CPA base: W3340
- Dialing code: +54 3756

Santo Tomé is a city in the province of Corrientes in the Argentine Mesopotamia. It had about 22,634 inhabitants at the 2001 census [INDEC]. It is the head town of the department of the same name.

== History ==
Santo Tomé was founded in 1632 by the Jesuit missionaries Luis Ernot and Manuel Bertot, with help from two native Guaraní chiefs that converted to Christianity. Its name is variedly found as Santo Tomás, Santo Tomás Apóstol, Santo Thomé and Santo Tomé.

== Geography ==
The city lies in the north-east of the province, on the right-hand (western) shore of the Uruguay River, opposite the city of São Borja in Rio Grande do Sul, Brazil. The area has typical features of the Región Submisionera, with reddish soil, abundant flora and high lands, alternating with gray-soil lowlands and swamps.

The climate is subtropical, with average temperatures of 20 °C (the summer maximum is 40 °C, and winters are mild). The average annual rainfall is between 1,400 and 1,600 mm, peaking in April (autumn) and October (spring).

== Notable people ==
- Clotilde González de Fernández (1880-1935), Argentine educator, piano teacher, writer
