= Federación Department =

Federación Departamento Federación
- Department
- Location of Federación Department within Entre Ríos Province

- Location of Federación in Argentina
- Coordinates: 30°45′S 58°06′W
- Country: Argentina
- Province: Entre Ríos Province
- Seat: Federación

Area
  - Total: 3,760 km^{2} (1,450 sq mi)

Population (2022)
  - Total: 78,691
  - Density: 20.9/km^{2} (54.2/sq mi)

Federación is a department of Entre Ríos Province, Argentina.
