= Alfredo Wagner =

Municipality in Brazil

Alfredo Wagner Alfredense The Municipality of Alfredo Wagner
- Municipality
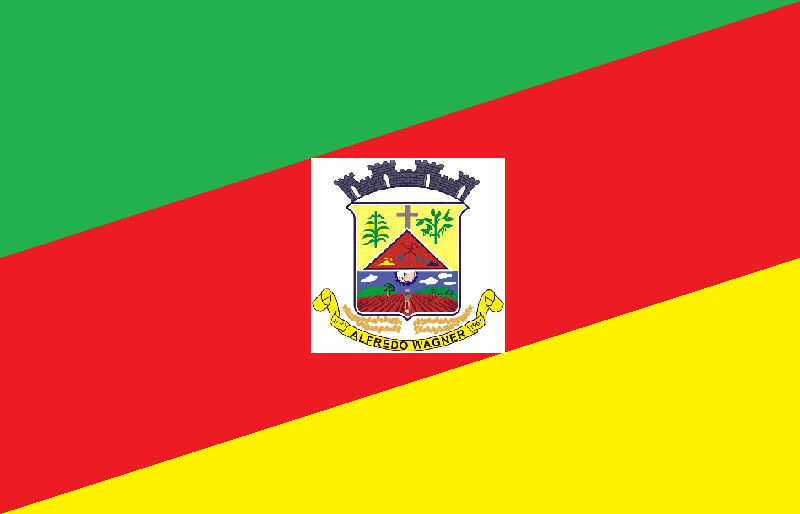
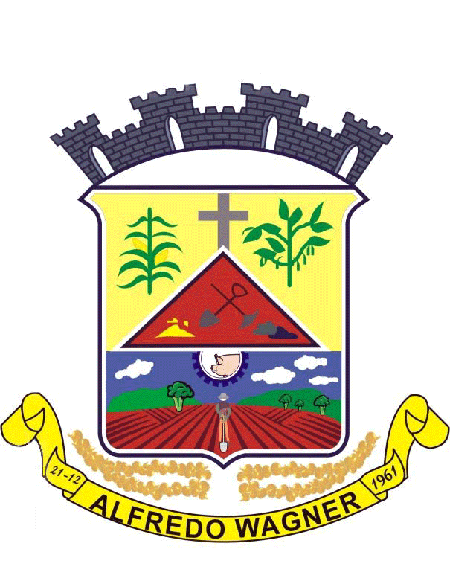
- Flag Coat of arms
- Nickname: Sources of Capital
- Coordinates: 27°42′00″S 49°20′02″W
- Country: Brazil
- Region: South
- State: Santa Catarina
- Mesoregion: Great Florianópolis
- Microregion: Tabuleiro
- Founded: December 21, 1961
- Mesoregion date: IBGE/2008
- Micoregion date: IBGE/2008

Government
  - Mayor: Naudir Antonio Schmitz (PMDB)

Population (2020)
  - Total: 10,086
- Time zone: UTC−3 (BRT)
- Postal Code: 88450-000
- Area code: (48)
- Nearby towns: Angelina, Anitápolis, Bom Retiro, Chapadão do Lageado, Imbuia, Ituporanga, Leoberto Leal e Rancho Queimado
- Distance to the capital: 78.1 km (48.5 mi)
- Website: www.alfredowagner.sc.gov.br

Alfredo Wagner is a municipality in the state of Santa Catarina in the South region of Brazil.

The municipality contains the Rio das Furnas Private Natural Heritage Reserve, created in 2002.

The first attempts of colonizing Alfredo Wagner were made at nineteen military in the Morro do Trombudo. The expedition was unsuccessful because snow was abundant and the rain in the three years ravaged the region. Augusto Lima, in 1893, settled in Rivers Adaga and Caeté, accompanied by some settlers. The local passed the name "Barracão", the first name of "Alfredo Wagner". The name is a homage to the men of more worked for emancipation political-administrative the municipality, dismembering of Bom Retiro.

== Prehistory ==
In the start of the 1990s, teachers of University Federal of Santa Catarina found the fossil of a dinosaur, who lived 220 million years ago.

== Colonization ==
The colonization the Alfredo Wagner mainly is the German and Italian, with the presence of Tyrolean of Italian language.

== See also ==
- List of municipalities in Santa Catarina
