= Buraco das Araras =

Buraco das Araras can refer to:

- Buraco das Araras (Goiás), Sinkhole located in Goiás, Brazil
- Buraco das Araras (Mato Grosso do Sul), Sinkhole located in Mato Grosso do Sul, Brazil
- Buraco das Araras Private Natural Heritage Reserve, protected area in Mato Grosso do Sul
