= Mata do Jambreiro Private Natural Heritage Reserve =

- Reserva Particular do Patrimônio Natural Mata de Jambreiros
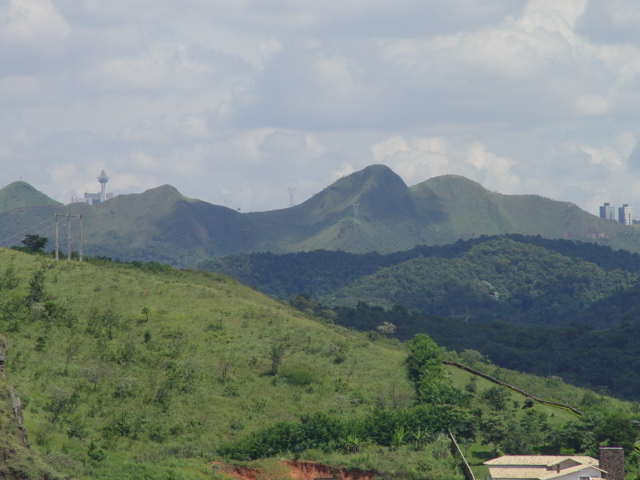
- Partial view of Mata do Jambreiro

- Location within Brazil
- Nearest city: Belo Horizonte, Minas Gerais
- Coordinates: 19°58′37″S 43°54′22″W
- Area: 912 hectares (2,250 acres)
- Designation: Private natural heritage reserve
- Created: 26 January 1979
- Administrator: Minas Gerais State Forestry Institute

Mata do Jambreiro Private Natural Heritage Reserve (Portuguese: Reserva Particular do Patrimônio Natural Mata de Jambreiros) is a state-regulated private natural heritage reserve to the south east of Belo Horizonte, Minas Gerais, Brazil.

== History ==
The reserve contains 912 hectares (2,250 acres) of seasonal forest in the municipality of Nova Lima in the state of Minas Gerais. There was concern that the Aguas Claras Mine, opened in the 1970s, would cause environmental damage. The Vale mining company therefore leased the area to the government of Minas Gerais for twenty years, while taking responsibility for conservation measures. The Mata do Jambreiro Biological Reserve (Reserva Biológica Mata do Jambreiro) was established on 26 January 1979 when a special committee was set up to implement the reserve to preserve the local ecology.

After the lease expired the mining company regained control, and created the Jambreiro Private Natural Heritage Reserve (Reserva Particular do Patrimônio Natural do Jambreiro). 912 hectares (2,250 acres) of high biodiversity continue to be preserved. It is administered by the State Forestry Institute in partnership with the MBR mining company. Because it does not meet regulatory requirements, the station is not eligible for the ICMBio Ecological incentives.

== Ecology ==
The reserve is part of the Southern Environmental Protection Area, certified as a Brazilian biosphere reserve by UNESCO. It lies in the transition zone between the cerrado and Atlantic Forest biomes. Most of the area was deforested in the first half of the 20th century, and the forest has also suffered from fires, so much of the vegetation is secondary regrowth. In most of the forest the canopy is 10 to 20 metres (33 to 66 ft) high, with emergent trees such as Cariniana estrellensis, Copaifera langsdorffii and Nectandra oppositifolia.

Higher up there are stony fields with sparse shrubs such as Lychnophora ericoides and Mimosa calodendron, and herbaceous plants such as Pleurothallis teres, Sophronittis crispata, Sophronittis caulescens, Epidendrum secundum and Oncidium gracile. The reserve is home to the Coimbra Filho's titi (Callicebus coimbrai), lontra, southern tamandua (Tamandua tetradactyla), white-throated hummingbird (Leucochloris albicollis) and blue manakin (Chiroxiphia caudata).

== Sources ==
- "Estação Ecológica Mata de Jambreiros", Ambientes Brasil (in Portuguese)
- "Um Tesouro Chamado Jambreiro", Revista Ecológico, 9 January 2012
