= Lageado (disambiguation) =

Lageado is a neighbourhood in the city of Porto Alegre, Rio Grande do Sul, Brazil. It may also refer to:

- Chapadão do Lageado, a town in Santa Catarina, Brazil
- The original name for the town of Guiratinga in Mato Grosso, Brazil
