= Jardim, Mato Grosso do Sul =

Coordinates: 21°28′48″S 56°8′16″W

Município de Jardim
- municipality
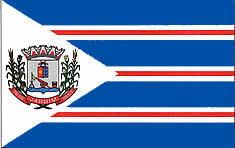
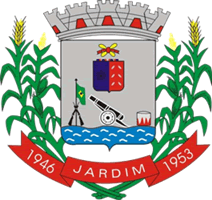
- Flag Coat of arms
- Nickname: A Capital do Sudoeste
- Location in Brazil
- Country: Brazil
- Region: Center-West
- State: Mato Grosso do Sul
- Founded: 1945

Government
  - Mayor: Carlos Américo Grubert (PSDB)

Area
  - municipality: 2,201.73 km^{2} (850.09 sq mi)
- Elevation: 259 m (850 ft)

Population (2020)
  - municipality: 26,238
  - Density: 10.58/km^{2} (27.4/sq mi)
  - Urban: 87%
- Time zone: UTC−4 (AMT)
- HDI (2000): 0.774 – medium
- Website: Jardim, MS

Jardim is a municipality located in the Brazilian state of Mato Grosso do Sul. Its population was 26,238 (2020) and its area is 2,202 km^{2} (850 sq mi).

The municipality holds the Buraco das Araras Private Natural Heritage Reserve, whose main feature is the huge sinkhole named the Buraco das Araras.
