= Lontra weiri =

Weir's otter Temporal range: Pliocene

Scientific classification
- Kingdom: Animalia
- Phylum: Chordata
- Class: Mammalia
- Order: Carnivora
- Family: Mustelidae
- Genus: Lontra
- Species: †L. weiri

Binomial name
- †Lontra weiri Prassack (2016)

Extinct species of carnivore

Lontra weiri (Weir's otter) is a fossil species in the carnivoran family Mustelidae from the Hagerman Fossil Beds of Idaho. It shared its habitat with Satherium piscinarium, a probable ancestor of the giant otter of South America. It is named in honor of musician Bob Weir, and is the oldest known member of its genus. Prior to its discovery, Lontra was thought to have evolved from Lutra licenti, which dates from the Pleistocene of East Asia.

== Description ==
Weir's otter was intermediate in form between Lutra (Old World river otters) and modern members of its genus. It was a small otter, similar in size to the modern marine otter (Lontra felina), which has a head-body length of 33 to 44 inches and can weigh up to 12 pounds. It is known from most of a right mandible and a left humerus.
