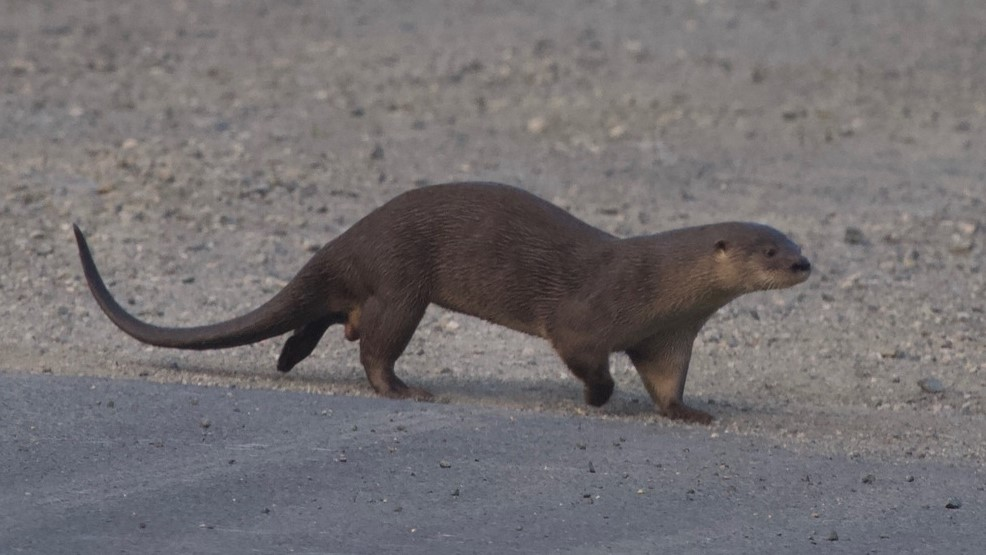
- Panama

Scientific classification
- Kingdom: Animalia
- Phylum: Chordata
- Class: Mammalia
- Order: Carnivora
- Family: Mustelidae
- Genus: Lontra
- Species: L. annectens

Binomial name
- Lontra annectens (Forsyth Major, 1897)

= Northern Neotropical river otter =

Subspecies or species of otter

The Northern Neotropical river otter (Lontra annectens), formerly classified as Lutra longicaudis annectens has recently been elevated to species status. This otter species is found in Central America and northwestern South America. Its distributions is disjunct from that of the other subspecies of Neotropical river otters and recent studies indicate that L. longicaudis is paraphyletic and that this subspecies should be recognized as a separate species Lontra annectens. This taxon is still regarded as a subspecies of Neotropical river otter by the IUCN.
