= Sapé, Paraíba =

Coordinates: 7°05′42″S 35°13′58″W

Sapé
- Municipality
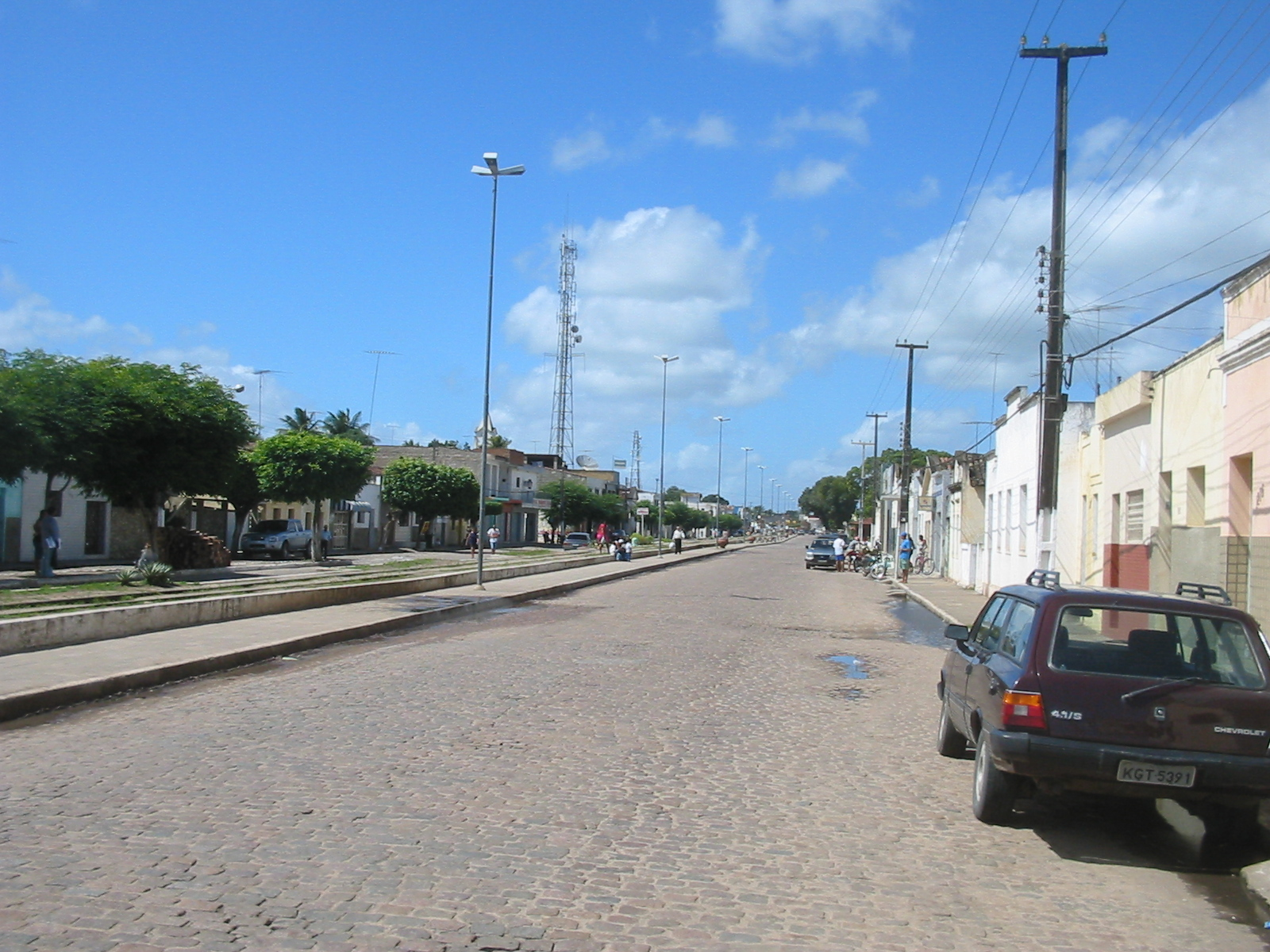

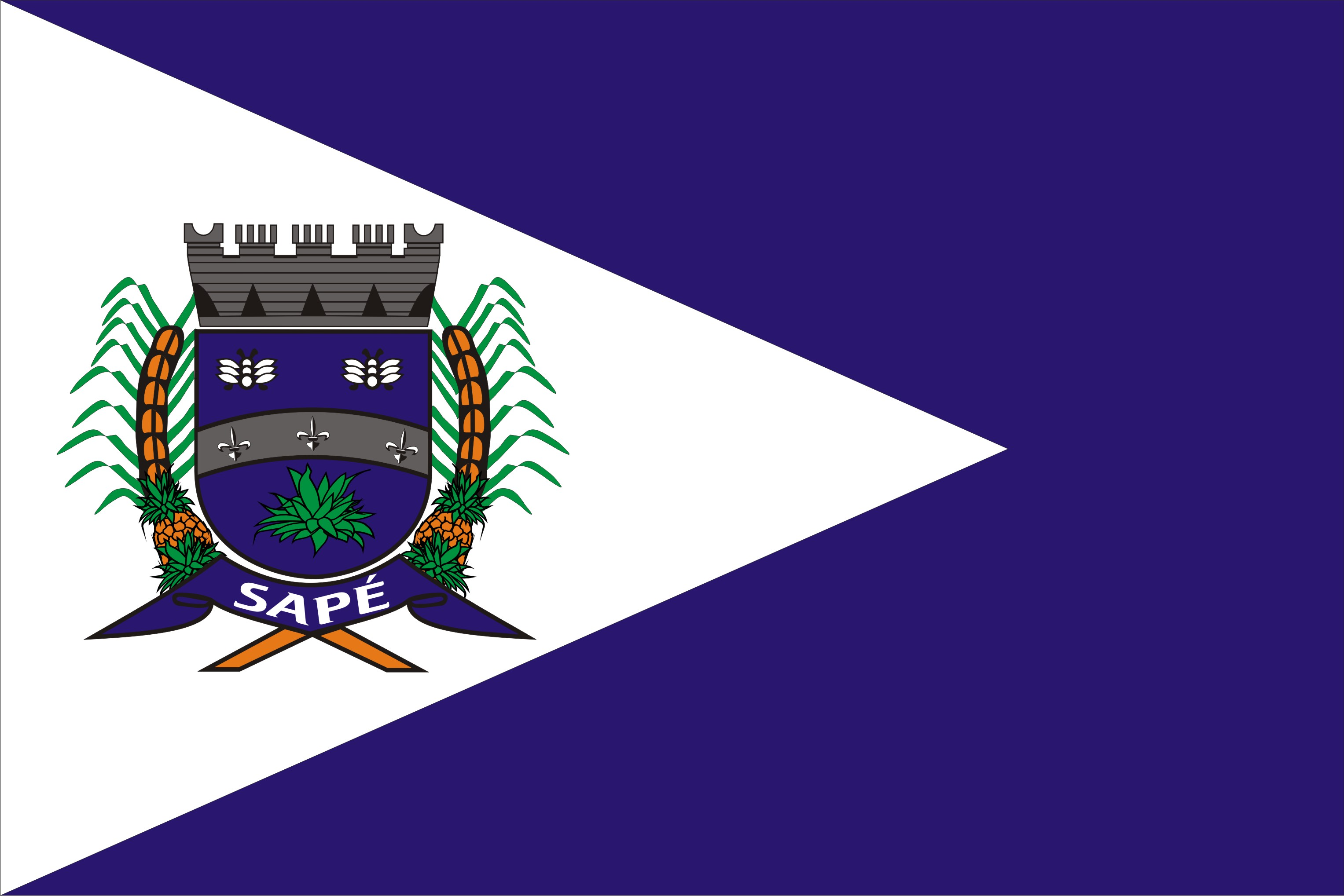
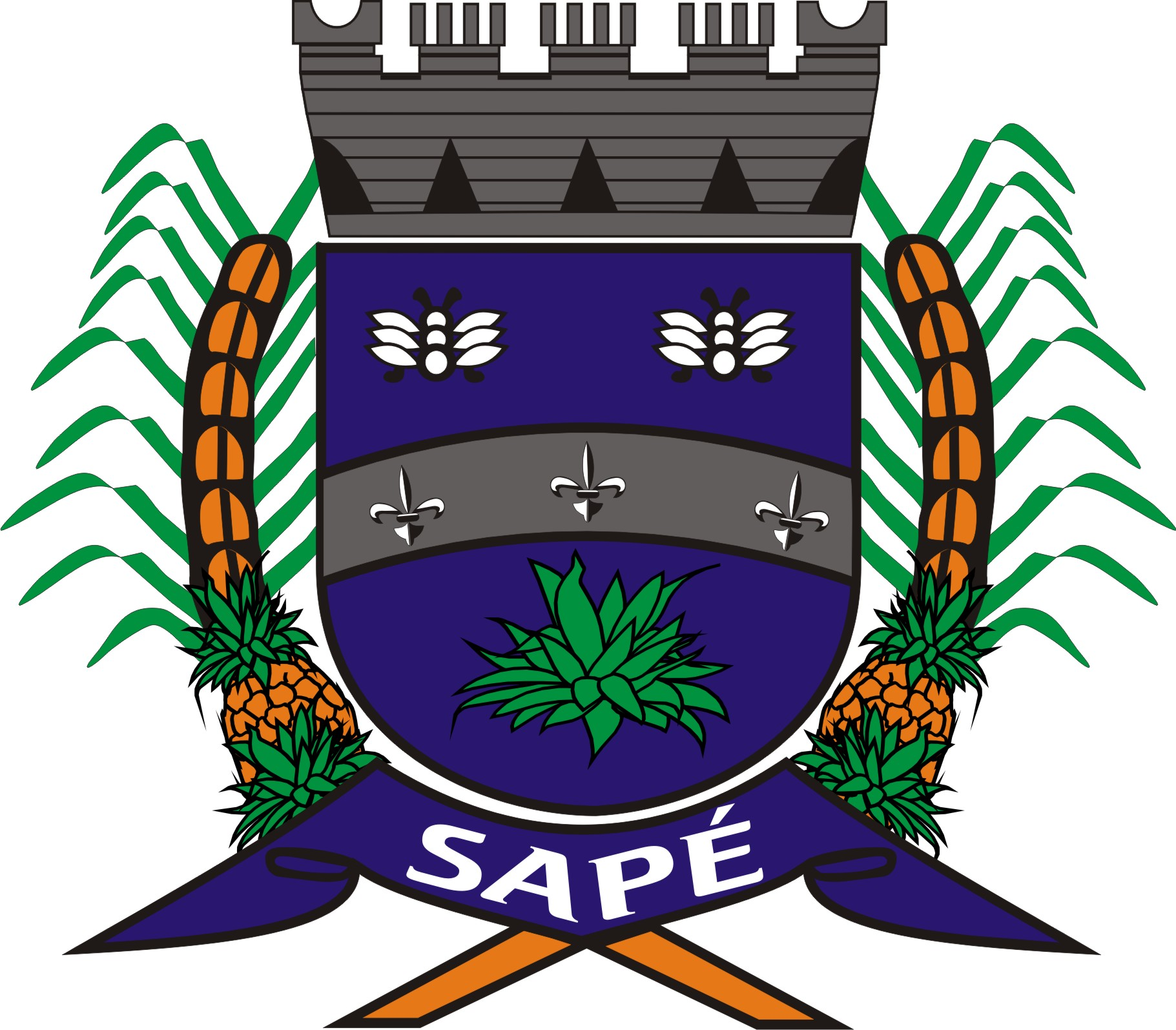
- Flag Coat of arms

- Location in Brazil
- Country: Brazil
- Region: Northeast
- State: Paraíba
- Mesoregion: Mata Paraibana

Population (2020)
  - Total: 52,804
- Time zone: UTC−3 (BRT)

Sapé is a municipality in the state of Paraíba in the Northeast Region of Brazil.

The municipality contains the Fazenda Pacatuba Private Natural Heritage Reserve, which protects a population of red-handed howler monkeys.

== See also ==
- List of municipalities in Paraíba
