= Rio das Furnas Private Natural Heritage Reserve =

Private natural heritage reserve in Brazil

- Reserva Particular do Patrimônio Natural Reserva Rio das Furnas
- IUCN category IV (habitat/species management area)
- Location within Brazil
- Nearest city: Alfredo Wagner, Santa Catarina
- Coordinates: 27°40′44″S 49°10′28″W
- Area: 53.5 ha (132 acres)
- Designation: Private natural heritage reserve
- Created: 19 April 2002
- Administrator: Renato Rizzaro, Gabriela Giovanka

The Rio das Furnas Private Natural Heritage Reserve (Portuguese: Reserva Particular do Patrimônio Natural Reserva Rio das Furnas) is a private natural heritage reserve in the state of Santa Catarina, Brazil.

== Location ==
The Rio das Furnas Private Natural Heritage Reserve is in the municipality of Alfredo Wagner, Santa Catarina. The Furnas River (Rio das Furnas) runs through the reserve. The reserve protects an area of moist forest nestled in a canyon. The canyon is in the Itajaí River basin in the Serra da Boa Vista, between the Cubatão, Tubarão and Tijucas basins. There are seven waterfalls, several natural pools and an archaeological site. Vegetation is the transition between dense and mixed rainforest with araucaria and altitude fields. More than 170 species of birds have been identified.

Threats include invasion of seedlings from the pine monocultures around the reserve, fires in the surrounding plateaus, and capture of birds for captive breeding and sale.

== History ==
The Rio das Furnas Private Natural Heritage Reserve was created with an area of 10 hectares (25 acres) by ordinance 61 of 19 April 2002. The property was thought to cover 28 hectares (69 acres). A georeferenced topographic survey of the area in 2007 during preparation of the management plan determined that it was in fact 53.5 hectares (132 acres). It was expanded to 53.5 hectares (132 acres) by ordinance 168 of 2013.

== Sources ==
- "Renato Rizzaro e Gabriela Giovanka proprietários da RPPN Rio das Furnas/SC", RPPNWeb (in Portuguese)
- Reserva Rio das Furnas (in Portuguese), Reserva Rio das Furnas
- RPPN Reserva Rio das Furnas (in Portuguese), ICMBio
- RPPN Rio das Furnas (in Portuguese), Associacao de Proprietarios de Reservas Particulares do Patrimônio Natural de Santa Caterina
- RPPN Rio das Furnas (PDF) (in Portuguese), ICMBio
