= Private natural heritage reserve (Brazil) =

Type of preservation area in Brazil

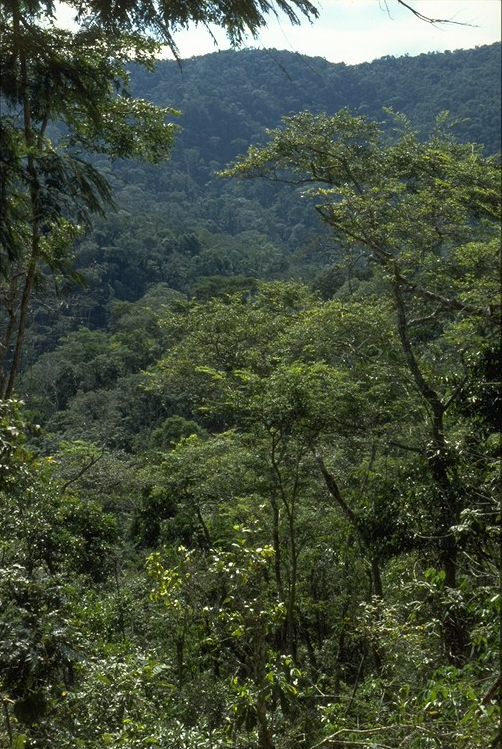
Feliciano Miguel Abdala Natural Reserve (former Caratinga Biological Station)

A private natural heritage reserve (Portuguese: Reserva Particular do Patrimônio Natural – RPPN) is a type of preservation area in Brazil, where the land is owned privately and may be used for research, education, eco-tourism or recreation. However, any such use must be compatible with the goals of preserving the environment and maintaining biodiversity.

== History ==
The concept of a private natural heritage reserve (RPPN) has its origin in the "Protective forest" defined in the Forest Code of 1934, an inalienable tax-exempt area that remained the property of its owner. The term was dropped from the Forest Code of 1965, and the tax exemptions dropped the next year. However, the Hunting Code of 1967 gave property owners the ability to prevent hunting on their property. In 1977 the legal entity of a "Private Refuge for Native Animals" was introduced, in which hunting would be banned. This was replaced ten years later by "Private Fauna and Flora Reserve" to cover protection of flora and marine fauna in addition to wild animals. In 1990 the new name "Private Natural Heritage Reserve" was adopted with new rules, including the possibility of recognition of RPPN's by state environmental agencies, a more democratic and perhaps less bureaucratic process. Finally, the concept of the RPPN was spelled out in Law No. 9.985 of 18 July 2000, which established the National System of Conservation Units (SNUC).

As of February 2024 there were 1136 RPPN's in Brazil covering about 621,400 hectares (1,536,000 acres), including units recognized at the federal, state and municipal levels. Various regional associations provide technical support to RPPN owners.

== Definition ==
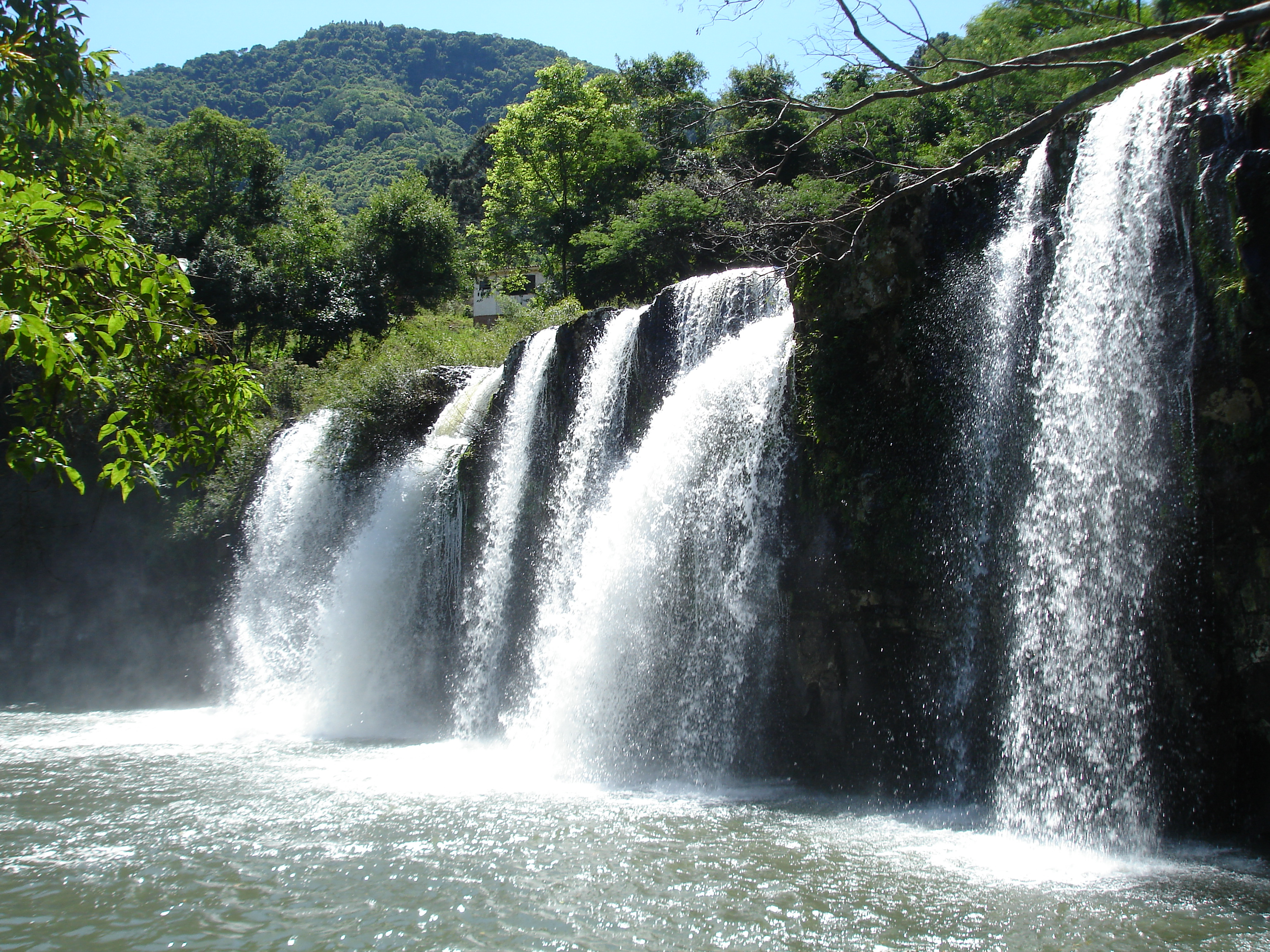
Pardinho River waterfall in the Santa Cruz do Sul University RPPN

A private natural heritage reserve is a sustainable use conservation unit under SNUC. Such units allow sustained use of renewable environmental resources, maintaining biodiversity and other ecological attributes. The reserves are established in private areas in perpetuity to preserve biodiversity. The owner is given incentives such as tax exemption. The SNUC specifies that sustainable use of the renewable environmental resources must be compatible with the essential ecological processes, maintaining biodiversity and ecological attributes. Sustainable use in this case includes scientific research and public visits for tourism, recreation and education.

== Value ==
RPPN's have been criticized for failing to conform to an overall plan for conservation at a national or regional level, for being dependent on the will of the owners, for being too small to have any effect in such a huge country and for lack of monitoring of RPPN management or effectiveness. On the other hand, RPPN's may have value due to their independence of political forces and their creation of additional protected areas on private land that may provide landscape connectivity, wildlife corridors and buffer zones around the other protected areas. Private and public agencies can help protect, manage and monitor an RPPN. And an RPPN, which is created without expropriations and gives value to the owner, may create less conflict than publicly owned units and more community involvement and awareness of the value of environmental conservation, restoration and research.

== Examples ==
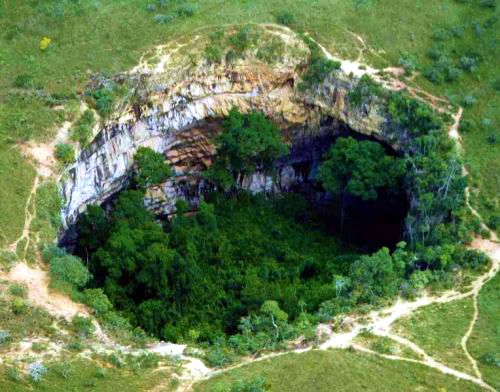
The giant sinkhole in Buraco das Araras RPPN

| Name | State | Area (ha) | Created | Biome |
|---|---|---|---|---|
| Buraco das Araras | Mato Grosso do Sul | 29 | 2007 | Cerrado |
| Cantidiano Valqueiro Barros | Pernambuco | 285 | 2003 | Caatinga |
| Cisalpina | Mato Grosso | 3,858 | 2016 | Cerrado |
| Engenho Gargaú | Paraíba | 1,059 | 1994 | Atlantic Forest |
| Fazenda Pacatuba | Paraíba | 267 | 1995 | Atlantic Forest |
| Feliciano Miguel Abdala | Minas Gerais | 958 | 2001 | Atlantic Forest |
| Mata da Estrela | Rio Grande do Norte | 2,040 | 2000 | Atlantic Forest |
| Mata do Jambreiro | Minas Gerais | 912 | 1979 | Atlantic Forest |
| Maurício Dantas | Pernambuco | 1,485 | 1997 | Caatinga |
| Mouth of the Aguapeí | São Paulo | 8,885 | 2010 | Atlantic Forest |
| Rio das Furnas | Santa Catarina | 53.5 | 2002 | Atlantic Forest |
| Rio das Lontras | Santa Catarina | 20 | 2005 | Atlantic Forest |
| Salto Morato | Paraná | 2,340 | 1994 | Atlantic Forest |
| Sebuí | Paraná | 400 | 1999 | Atlantic Forest |
| Serra das Almas | Ceará | 5,845 | 2001 | Caatinga |
| Sossego Forest | Minas Gerais | 134 | 1998 | Atlantic Forest |
| Santa Cruz do Sul University | Rio Grande do Sul | 221 | 2009 | Atlantic Forest |

== Sources ==
- Áreas protegidas (in Portuguese), Apremavi - Associação de Preservação do Meio Ambiente e da Vida, archived from the original on 2016-05-02
- Categorias (in Portuguese), Chico Mendes Institute for Biodiversity Conservation
- Reserva Particular do Patrimônio Natural (in Portuguese), ISA: Instituto Socioambiental
