= Brasilândia =

- Municipality
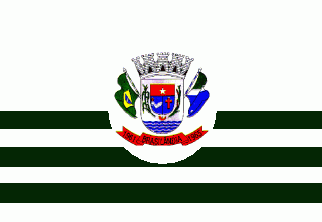
- Flag

- Location in Mato Grosso do Sul state

- Location in Brazil
- Coordinates: 21°15′21″S 52°02′13″W
- Country: Brazil
- Region: Central-West
- State: Mato Grosso do Sul

Area
  - Total: 5,807 km^{2} (2,242 sq mi)

Population (2020)
  - Total: 11,853
  - Density: 2.041/km^{2} (5.287/sq mi)
- Time zone: UTC−4 (AMT)

Brazlândia is a municipality located in the Brazilian state of Mato Grosso do Sul. Its population was 11,853 (2020) and its area is 5,807 km^{2}.

The municipality contains the 3,858 hectares (9,530 acres) Cisalpina Private Natural Heritage Reserve, created in 2016.
