= Cisalpina Private Natural Heritage Reserve =

Private natural heritage reserve in Brazil

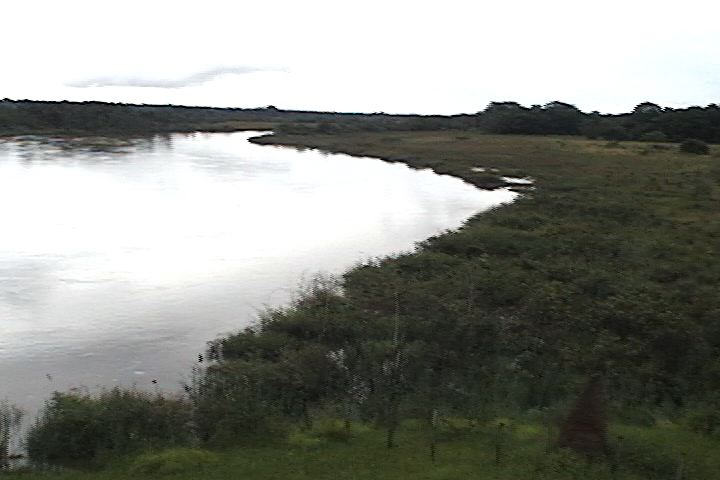
- Rio Verde between Três Lagoas and Brasilândia

- Location within Brazil
- Nearest city: Brasilândia, Mato Grosso do Sul
- Coordinates: 21.226156°S 51.923692°W
- Area: 3,857.70 hectares (9,532.6 acres)
- Designation: Private natural heritage reserve
- Created: 16 November 2005
- Administrator: CESP

The Cisalpina Private Natural Heritage Reserve is a private natural heritage reserve in the state of Mato Grosso do Sul, Brazil. It contains an area of marshland at the head of the reservoir of the Eng Sérgio Motta Dam on the Paraná River.

== Location ==
The Cisalpina Private Natural Heritage Reserve (RPPN) is in the municipality of Brasilândia, Mato Grosso do Sul. It is 388 kilometres (241 mi) from Campo Grande, the state capital, and 14 kilometres (8.7 mi) from Brasilândia. It has an area of 3,857.70 hectares (9,532.6 acres). (Note: According to the owner, the Companhia Energética de São Paulo (CESP), the reserve has an area of 6,261.75 hectares (15,473.1 acres). The resolution creating the reserve gives the area of 3,857.70 hectares (9,532.6 acres).)

The reserve is in the region where the Rio Verde and Paraná River converge, and contains a complex system of interconnected lagoons, streams and channels connected to the channel of the Paraná, which has shifted its bed to the east over time. There are traces of old channels of the Paraná dating back 10,000 to 40,000 years. The terrain is gently undulating. There are two important prehistoric archaeological sites.

== History ==
The Cisalpina Private Natural Heritage Reserve was created as partial compensation for the land flooded by the Companhia Energética de São Paulo (CESP) with the Eng Sérgio Motta Dam on the Paraná River, which would flood 13,227 hectares (32,680 acres) of the Lagoa São Paulo Reserve and 3,211 hectares (7,930 acres) of the Great Pontal Reserve. (Note: Other protected areas created to compensate for the dam were the 7,720 hectares (19,100 acres) Rio do Peixe State Park, the 9,043 hectares (22,350 acres) Aguapeí State Park and the 73,345 hectares (181,240 acres) Rio Ivinhema State Park.)

The area once included the Fazenda Olímpia, which was acquired in the 1950s by the Grupo Cisalpina Agrícola S/A. This in turn was acquired by CESP. CESP also acquired the Fazenda Flórida. These formed the Cisalpina/Flórida Complex. The idea of converting the complex into a private natural heritage reserve was described by CESP in a document of 26 November 2003. The proposed reserve had an area of 6,261.2573 hectares (15,471.904 acres). This would be part of a larger managed area of 22,886 hectares (56,550 acres). The reserve proper was limited to the land above the 259 metres (850 ft) waterline allowed for seasonal operation of the reservoir.

The Brazilian Institute of Environment and Renewable Natural Resources (IBAMA) began the process of analyzing the request on 7 June 2004. The municipal chamber of Brasilândia approved creation of the reserve on 16 November 2005. The state of Mato Grosso do Sul formally created the reserve on 6 June 2016 with an area of 3,857.6965 hectares (9,532.576 acres), this being the sum of the areas of the Fazenda Flórida and Fazenda Olímpia properties. Land ownership is fully regularized, and the reserve's boundaries are surrounded. As of 2016 the management plan was being completed.

== Environment ==
The climate is hot and humid, with one to three dry months. The reserve covers an extensive area of várzea that is periodically flooded in the rainy season. The circulation in the area was drastically changed when the reservoir of the Eng Sérgio Motta Dam filled, changing the equilibrium of the system. As of 2012 the vegetation was still adapting to the new conditions of moisture. The region had been slowly becoming drier, but is now returning to moister conditions. The mix of cerrado species is probably changing due to the rise in the level of the groundwater.

The vegetation has a wide variety of species caused by climate and geomorphological changes during the Quaternary, the reserve's diverse environments and previous human occupation. There are at least 95 plant species, 171 bird species, 25 species of terrestrial fauna, 44 species of fish. Cactus plants are found some areas, probably remnants of an earlier climate. Use for farming and ranching introduced exotic species of grass. In the drier parts there are plants of the cerrado and cerradão forests. These areas are being partially reforested in a program that is also releasing native animals. The vegetation is still in the process of regenerating. Fauna include marsh deer (Blastocerus dichotomus), maned wolf (Chrysocyon brachyurus), broad-snouted caiman (Caiman latirostris), giant anteater (Myrmecophaga tridactyla) and southern tamandua (Tamandua tetradactyla).

Sanitation in the municipality is poor. The soil and groundwater are contaminated and untreated sewage flows via the Aviação and Bom Jardim channels into the reservoir. Environmental crimes by local residents indicate a lack of awareness of the importance of the reserve. The reserve would be part of the proposed Trinational Biodiversity Corridor, which aims to provide forest connections between conservation units in Brazil, Paraguay and Argentina in the Upper Paraná ecoregion.

== Sources ==
- Araújo Corte, Dione Angélica de; Valladares-Pádua, Cláudio Benedito (November 2007), Plano de Manejo da Estação Ecológica Mico-Leão-Preto (PDF) (in Portuguese), Brasília: ICMBio, archived from the original (PDF) on 2016-11-07
- Dutra, Carlos Alberto Dos Santos (2007-11-22), O Brilho Na Tribuna (in Portuguese), Clube de Autores, PKEY:90117733
- Feitosa, Marcelo Viana; Andrade, Fernando Brandão de; Rodrigues, Maria Lúcia Mesquita (November 2009), Plano de Manejo para a RPPN Cisalpina em Brasilândia/MS: Avaliação da Metodologia e Pplanejamento Adotado (PDF) (in Portuguese), CESP
- PES do Rio do Peixe (in Portuguese), ISA: Instituto Socioambiental
- Silva, Katia Kayahara da; Rocha, Paulo César (November 2009), "Reserva Particular do Patrimonio Natural RPPN Cisalpina e Comunidade Local" (PDF), 5o Congresso de Extensao Universitaria da UNESP (in Portuguese)
- Silva, Katia Kayahara da (31 August 2012), Análise socioambiental da RPPN Cisalpina e entorno a partir da teoria sistêmica (Dissertation) (in Portuguese), Universidade Federal da Grande Dourados, archived from the original on 14 November 2016
- Unidades de Conservação (in Portuguese), CSEP: Companhia Energética de São Paulo, archived from the original on 2014-05-02
- Verruck, Jaime Elias (6 June 2016), RESOLUÇÃO SEMADE Nº 35, de 06 de junho de 2016 (PDF) (in Portuguese), archived from the original (PDF) on 14 November 2016
