= Fazenda Pacatuba Private Natural Heritage Reserve =

Private natural heritage reserve in Paraíba, Brazil

- Reserva Particular do Patrimônio Natural Fazenda Pacatuba
- Location within Brazil
- Nearest city: Sapé, Paraíba
- Coordinates: 7°02′32″S 35°09′13″W
- Area: 266.53 ha (658.6 acres)
- Designation: Private natural heritage reserve
- Created: 29 December 1995

The Fazenda Pacatuba Private Natural Heritage Reserve (Portuguese: Reserva Particular do Patrimônio Natural Fazenda Pacatuba) is a private natural heritage reserve in the state of Paraíba, Brazil. It protects a population of red-handed howler monkeys.

== Location ==
The Fazenda Pacatuba Private Natural Heritage Reserve in the municipality of Sapé, Paraíba in the Mata Paraibana mesoregion. It has an area of 266.53 hectares (658.6 acres), part of the larger 2,600 hectares (6,400 acres) Fazenda Pacatuba. The property belongs to the Japungú distillery. The reserve is 7 kilometres (4.3 mi) from the municipal seat.

== History ==
The Fazenda Pacatuba Private Natural Heritage Reserve was created by decree 110-N of 29 December 1995. Its purpose was to protect the red-handed howler (Alouatta belzebul), a primate that weighs about 5 kilograms (11 lb), lives in the trees and eats fruit and leaves. The primate is endemic to Brazil and has two unconnected populations, one in the eastern Amazon region and the other in the Atlantic Forest north of the São Francisco River.

== Environment ==
The reserve is in the Paraiba River basin. Soil is Tertiary sediments of sand or sand-clay, with low fertility. Altitudes are 75 to 150 metres (246 to 492 ft). The climate is northeast coast tropical, dominated by humid air masses from the Atlantic Ocean. Average annual rainfall is 1,600 millimetres (63 in), falling mainly in the late summer and early winter.

The reserve contains one of the few remaining fragments of Atlantic Forest in the state of Paraíba. Vegetation is mainly seasonal semi-deciduous forest, with two types of formation. One is drier, wooded savanna and the other is more humid, with emergent trees up to 35 metres (115 ft) and trunks up to 4 metres (13 ft) in circumference, carrying abundant epiphytes. A study published in 2013 reported 24 species of ferns in 18 genera.

== Sources ==
- Araujo, K. P. P.; Crispim, M.C.; Lourenco, L.J.S. (September 2009), "Analise da comunidade zooplanctonica, como bioindicadora da qualidade da agua, no Acude Padre Azevedo, fazenda pacatuba, Sape, Paraiba" (PDF), Anais do IX Congresso de Ecologia do Brasil (in Portuguese), Universidade Federal da Paraiba, archived from the original (PDF) on 2016-03-03
- RPPN Fazenda Pacatuba (in Portuguese), ICMBio
- Silvestre, Leandro Costa; Xavier, Sergio Romero da Silva (25 October 2013), "Samambaias em fragmento de Mata Atlântica, Sapé, Paraíba, Brasil" (PDF), Boletim do Museu Paraense Emílio Goeldi. Ciências Naturais (in Portuguese), 8 (3)
- Sousa, Luciana Lima de; Oliveira, Jonas M. de, Filho; Moura, Antonio C. de A.; Langguth, Alfredo (September 2011), "Biologia alimentar e dispersao de sementes pelo guariba (Alouatta belzebul) na Paraiba" (PDF), X Congresso de Ecologia do Brasil (in Portuguese), archived from the original (PDF) on 2016-03-03
