= Rio do Peixe State Park =

State Park in Sao Paulo, Brazil

- Parque Estadual do Rio do Peixe
- IUCN category II (national park)
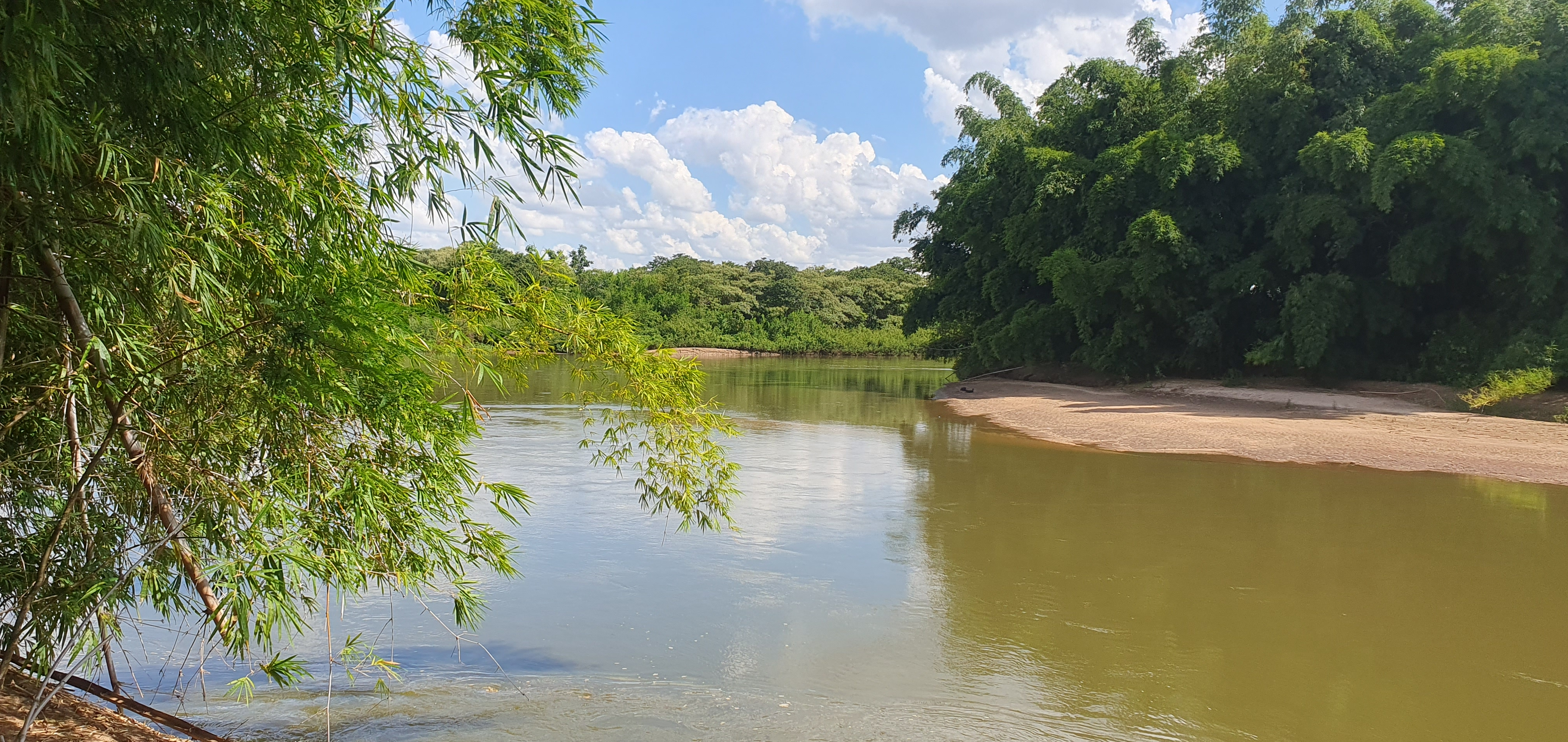

- Location within Brazil
- Nearest city: Ouro Verde, São Paulo
- Coordinates: 21°36′18″S 51°42′18″W
- Area: 7,720 hectares (19,100 acres)
- Designation: State park
- Created: 9 August 2002

The Rio do Peixe State Park (Portuguese: Parque Estadual do Rio do Peixe) is a state park in the state of São Paulo, Brazil.

== Location ==
The Rio do Peixe State Park is divided between the municipalities of Dracena, Ouro Verde, Piquerobi and Presidente Venceslau, São Paulo. It has an area of 7,720 hectares (19,100 acres). The park would be part of the proposed Trinational Biodiversity Corridor, which aims to provide forest connections between conservation units in Brazil, Paraguay and Argentina in the Upper Paraná ecoregion.

== Environment ==
The park protects the margins of the Rio do Peixe, a left tributary of the Paraná River, in a region near its mouth where it meanders through várzea interspersed with permanent or temporary lagoons. Due to its similarity with the Pantanal, this section of the Rio do Peixe is sometimes called the "São Paulo Pantanal". The park is known for its marsh deer (Blastocerus dichotomus), the largest deer in South America at up to 2 metres (6 ft 7 in) in length, which is found in marshes with high vegetation from southern Peru and Brazil to Uruguay. The park is rich in bird species, including several threatened with extinction.

Threats include hunting, fishing and bait collection for fishing. In May 2016 about 40 volunteers participated in the 5th annual clean-up of the park and removed about 500 kilograms (1,100 lb) of solid waste, mostly plastic bottles.

== History ==
The Rio do Peixe State Park was created by state decree 47.095 of 9 August 2002 with an area of 7,720 hectares (19,100 acres). It was created as partial compensation for the land flooded by the Companhia Energética de São Paulo (CESP) with the Engenheiro Sérgio Motta Hydroelectric Power Plant on the Paraná River, which would flood 13,227 hectares (32,680 acres) of the Lagoa São Paulo Reserve and 3,211 hectares (7,930 acres) of the Great Pontal Reserve. Other protected areas created to compensate for the dam were the 73,345-hectare (181,240-acre) Rio Ivinhema State Park, the 9,043-hectare (22,350-acre) Aguapeí State Park and the 6,262-hectare (15,470-acre) Cisalpina Private Natural Heritage Reserve.

The areas of the park were declared of public utility on 22 February 2005. Fishing regulations were published on 2 October 2008, covering conservation areas and their buffer zones in the Paraná River basin. They were the Morro do Diabo State Park, Rio do Peixe State Park, Aguapeí State Park, Mico Leão Preto Ecological Station, Ivinhema State Park, Ilha Grande National Park, Caiuá Ecological Station and Iguaçu National Park. As of 2016 property ownership in the Rio do Peixe State Park had still not been regularized. When the properties have been acquired they will be donated by CESP to the state of São Paulo.

On 9 June 2016 State Governor Geraldo Alckmin and Secretary of the Environment Patricia Iglecias attended a ceremony to plant seedlings of native Atlantic Forest trees as part of the project to restore a 245-hectare (610-acre) area of the park. The project would plant seedlings in 90 hectares (220 acres), allow natural regeneration of 78 hectares (190 acres) and manage forest fragments in 77 hectares (190 acres). On 15 June 2016 SEMA announced that the state park would start to receive visitors after construction of an access point from the SP-563 highway. The access point would lead to the park headquarters, with a visitor center, administrative offices, workshop and warehouse, and accommodations for visitors, students and researchers. These buildings had not yet been completed due to technical and legal delays.

== Sources ==
- Araújo Corte, Dione Angélica de; Valladares-Pádua, Cláudio Benedito (November 2007), Plano de Manejo da Estação Ecológica Mico-Leão-Preto (PDF) (in Portuguese), Brasília: ICMBio, archived from the original (PDF) on 2016-11-07
- "Parque Estadual Rio do Peixe promove o 5º mutirão de limpeza no Rio do Peixe", Portal Regional (in Portuguese), 22 May 2016
- PES do Aguapeí (in Portuguese), ISA: Instituto Socioambiental
- PES do Rio do Peixe (in Portuguese), ISA: Instituto Socioambiental
- Pinato, Gilmar (15 June 2016), "Parque do Rio do Peixe passará a receber visitantes após construção de portal e acesso na SP-563", Portal Regional
- Resumo Executivo do Plano de Manejo do Parque Estadual do Rio do Peixe (PDF) (in Portuguese), SEMA/SP
- Sobre a Unidade de Conservação (in Portuguese), SAP: Sistema Ambiental Paulista, archived from the original on 2014-07-29
- Unidades de Conservação (in Portuguese), CSEP: Companhia Energética de São Paulo, archived from the original on 2014-05-02
