= Fonck Lake =

Lake in Patagonia

- Location within Argentina
- Location: Bariloche Department, Río Negro Province, Argentina, in Patagonia
- Coordinates: 41.317061°S 72.0574812°W
- Type: Glacial lake
- Basin countries: Argentina
- Max. length: 6,153 metres (20,187 ft)
- Max. width: 834 metres (2,736 ft)
- Surface elevation: 778 m (2,552 ft)

Fonck Lake (Spanish: Lago Fonck) is a lake in the Andes of northern Patagonia in the Argentine Río Negro Province. The lake is named after the German naturalist Franz Fonck. Southern river otter has been reported in the lake for the first time in 2022.

== Fly fishing paradise ==
Fonck lake lies in a deep and wide valley surrounded by majestic mountains where Cerro Tronador is the main attraction, and thick and spectacular native forest of Coihues, Ñires and Lengas trees.

This lake has an extraordinary structure that holds a large number of brown trout, rainbow trout and Fontinalis (Brook trout) from 14 to 24 inches long. The shoreline is full of obstacles and natural structure like fallen trees, flats, reeds, sunken trunks, sheer walls, deep drop-offs and tributary streams.

Map of Nahuel Huapi National Park displaying Fonck Lake to in the west near the Argentina–Chile border.
