= Ouro Verde, São Paulo =

Ouro Verde
- Municipality
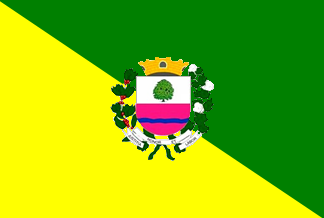
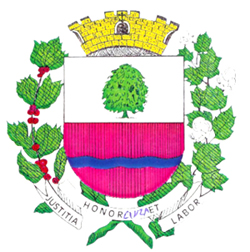
- Flag Coat of arms

- Location in São Paulo state

- Location in Brazil
- Coordinates: 21°29′22″S 51°42′1″W
- Country: Brazil
- Region: Southeast
- State: São Paulo

Area
  - Total: 267 km^{2} (103 sq mi)

Population (2020)
  - Total: 8,620
  - Density: 32.3/km^{2} (83.6/sq mi)
- Time zone: UTC−3 (BRT)

Ouro Verde (Portuguese for "green gold") is a municipality in the state of São Paulo in Brazil. The population is 8,620 (2020 est.) in an area of 267 km^{2} (103 sq mi). The elevation is 350m.

The municipality contains part of the 7,720 hectares (19,100 acres) Rio do Peixe State Park, created in 2002.

== Media ==
In telecommunications, the city was served by Companhia de Telecomunicações do Estado de São Paulo until 1973, when it began to be served by Telecomunicações de São Paulo. In July 1998, this company was acquired by Telefónica, which adopted the Vivo brand in 2012.

The company is currently an operator of cell phones, fixed lines, internet (fiber optics/4G) and television (satellite and cable).

== Religion ==
Christianity is present in the city as follows:

=== Catholic Church ===
The Catholic church in the municipality is part of the Roman Catholic Diocese of Marília.

=== Protestant Church ===
The most diverse evangelical beliefs are present in the city, mainly Pentecostal, including the Assemblies of God in Brazil (the largest evangelical church in the country), Christian Congregation in Brazil, among others. These denominations are growing more and more throughout Brazil.

== See also ==
- List of municipalities in São Paulo
