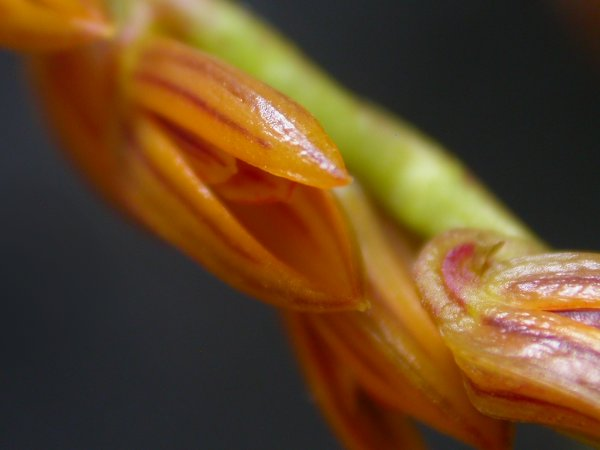

Scientific classification
- Kingdom: Plantae
- Clade: Tracheophytes
- Clade: Angiosperms
- Clade: Monocots
- Order: Asparagales
- Family: Orchidaceae
- Subfamily: Epidendroideae
- Genus: Acianthera
- Species: A. teres

Binomial name
- Acianthera teres (Lindl.) Borba (2003)

Synonyms
- Pleurothallis teres Lindl. (1835) (Basionym); Pleurothallis rupestris Lindl. (1835); Pleurothallis pachyphylla Rchb.f. (1850); Humboldtia pachyphylla (Rchb.f.) Kuntze (1891); Humboldtia rupestris (Lindl.) Kuntze (1891); Humboldtia teres (Lindl.) Kuntze (1891); Acianthera rupestris (Lindl.) F. Barros (2002)

= Acianthera teres =

Species of orchid

Acianthera teres is a species of orchid.
