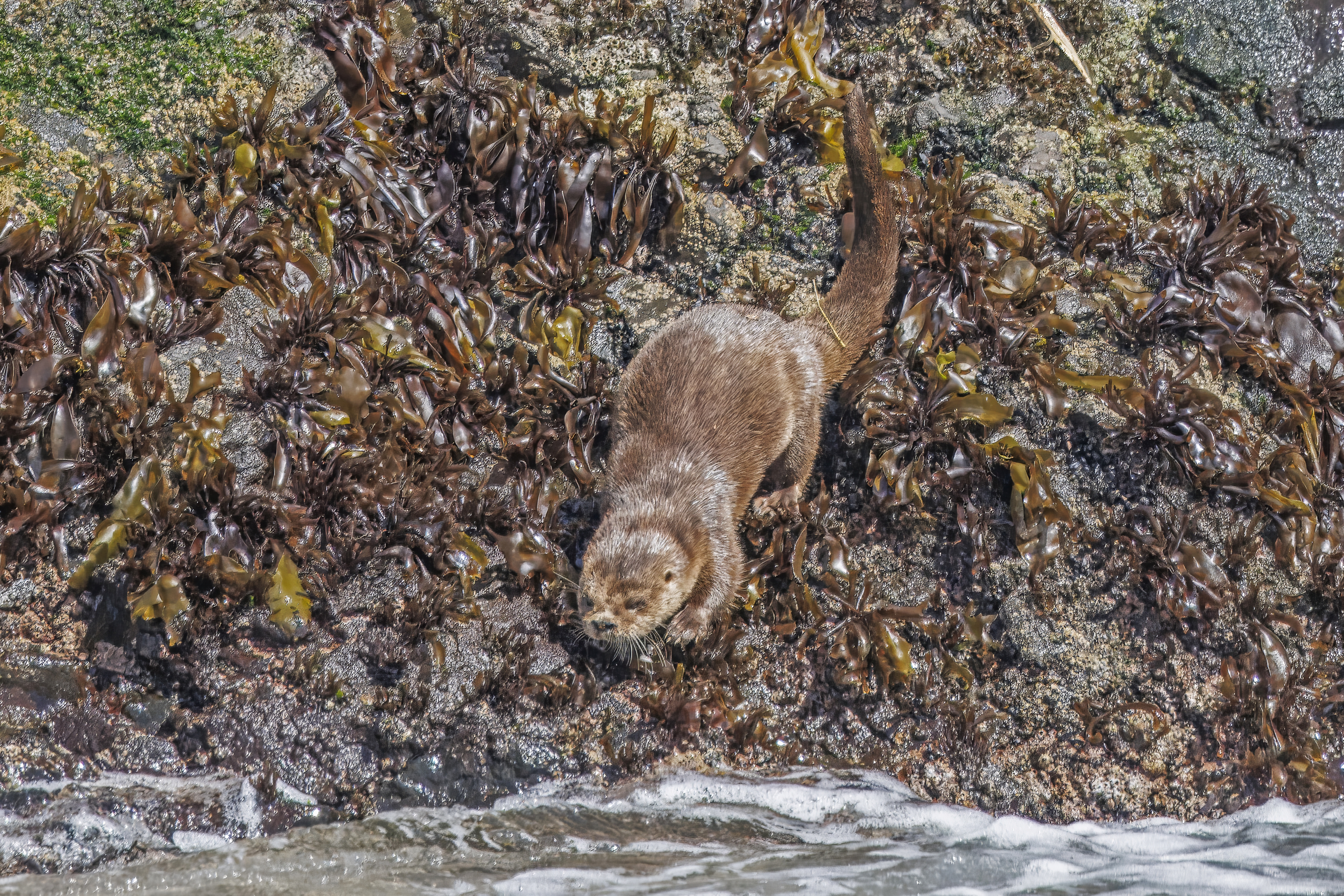
- Puñihuil, Ancud, Chiloé Island

Conservation status
- Endangered (IUCN 3.1)
- CITES Appendix I

Scientific classification
- Kingdom: Animalia
- Phylum: Chordata
- Class: Mammalia
- Infraclass: Placentalia
- Order: Carnivora
- Family: Mustelidae
- Genus: Lontra
- Species: L. felina

Binomial name
- Lontra felina (Molina, 1782)
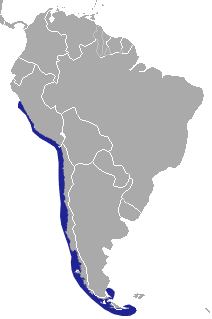
- Marine otter range

= Marine otter =

Species of South American mammal (Lontra felina)

The marine otter (Lontra felina) is a rare and relatively unknown South American mammal of the weasel family (Mustelidae). The scientific name means "feline otter", and in Spanish, the marine otter is also often referred to as gato marino: "marine cat". The marine otter (while spending much of its time out of the water) only lives in saltwater, coastal environments and rarely ventures into fresh water or estuarine habitats. This saltwater exclusivity is unlike most other otter species, except for the almost fully aquatic sea otter (Enhydra lutris) of the North Pacific.

== Description ==
The marine otter is one of the smallest otters and the smallest marine mammal, measuring 87 to 115 cm (34 to 45 in) from the nose to the tip of the tail and weighs 3 to 5 kg (6.6 to 11.0 lb). The tail measures 30 to 36 cm (12 to 14 in). Its fur is coarse, with guard hairs measuring up to 2 cm (0.79 in) in length covering dense, insulating underfur. The marine otter is dark brown above and on the sides, and fawn on the throat and underside.

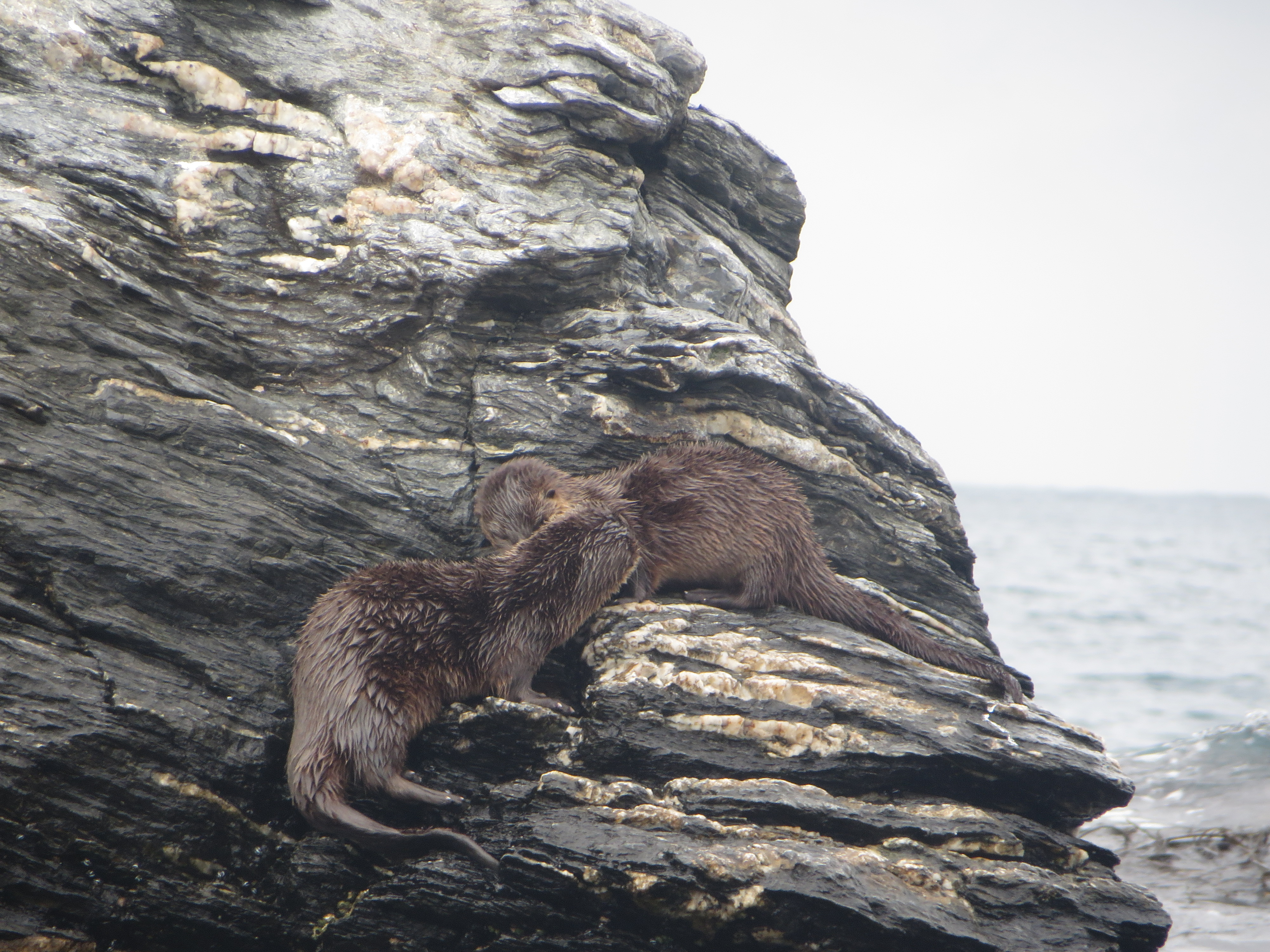
socializing

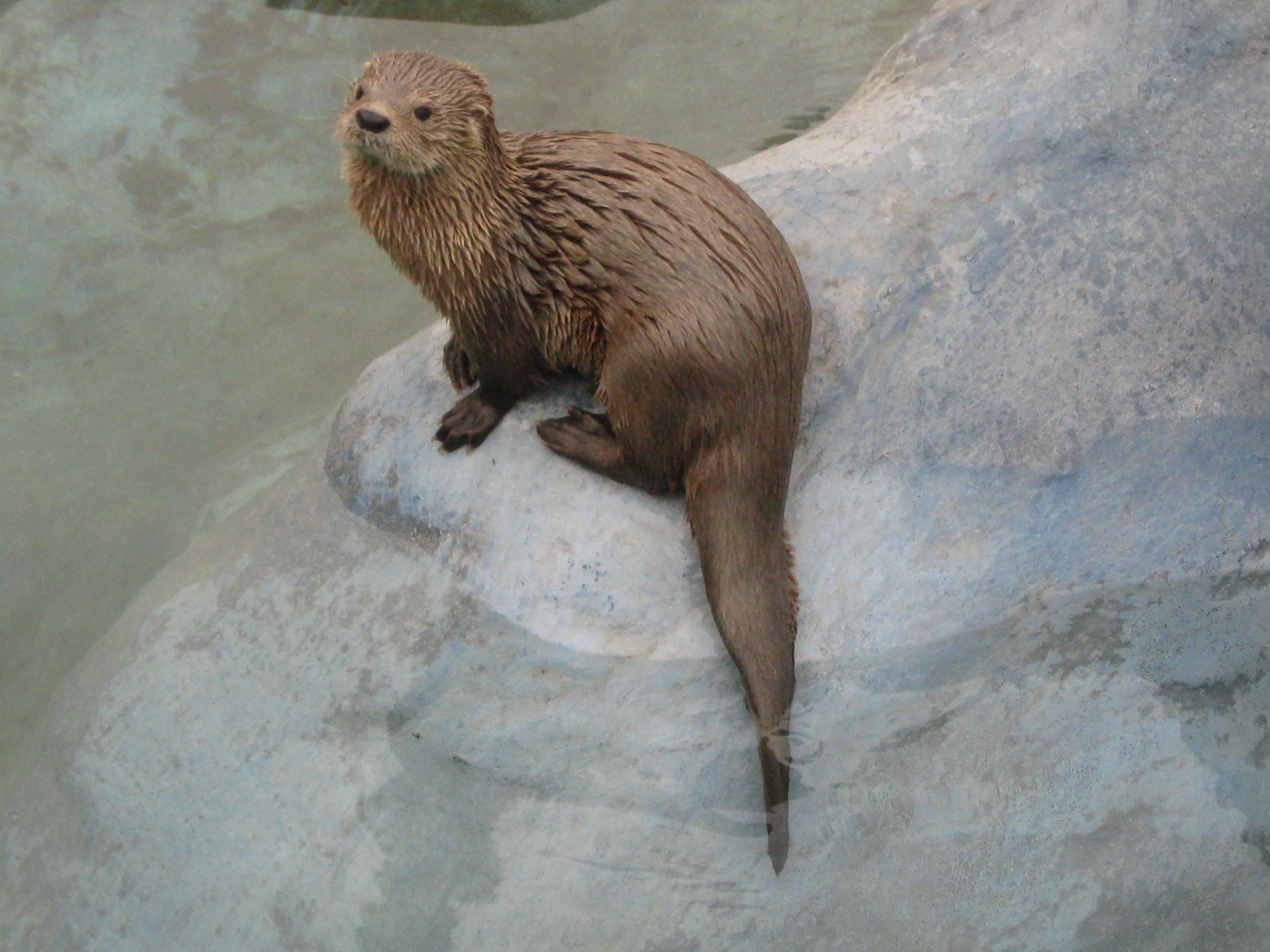
In Huachipa Zoo, Peru

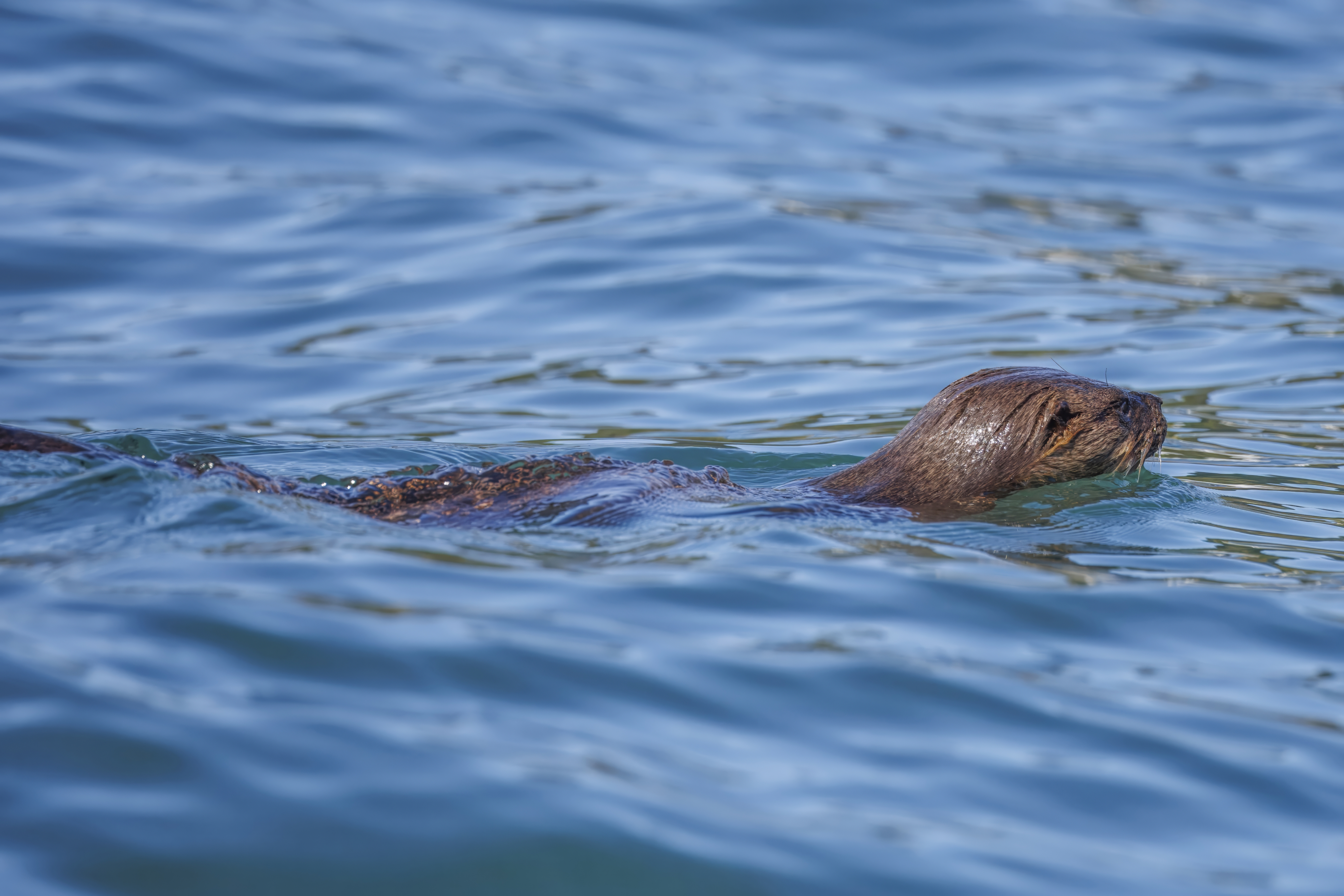
swimming, Chile

The marine otter has webbed paws and strong claws. The ventral side (underside) of the paws are partially covered in fur. It has 36 teeth and a dental formula of 3.1.3-4.13.1.3.2. The teeth are developed for slicing instead of crushing. The marine otter does not display sexual dimorphism.

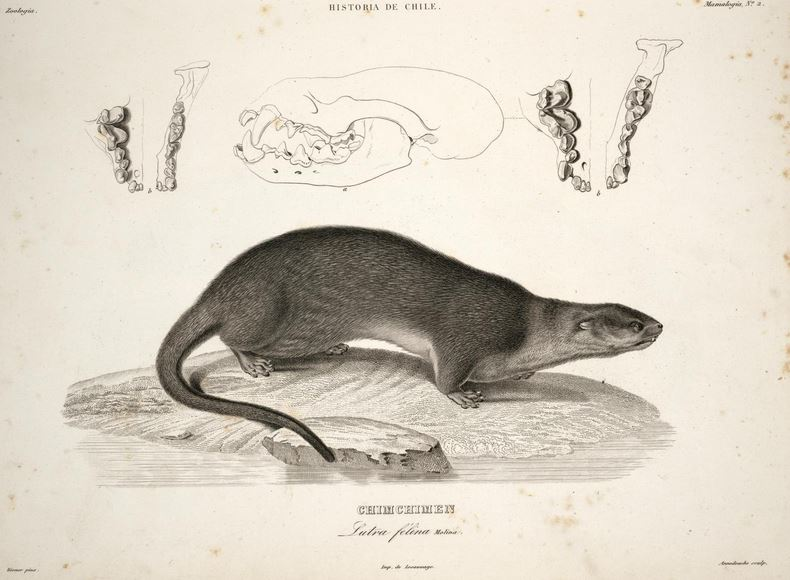
Art by Jacques Christophe Werner, 30 April 1848

== Distribution and habitat ==
Marine otters are found in littoral areas of southwestern South America, close to shore and in the intertidal areas of northern Peru (from the port of Chimbote), along the entire coast of Chile, and the extreme southern reaches of Argentina. Occasional vagrant sightings still occur as far afield as the Falkland Islands.

The marine otter mainly inhabits rocky shorelines with abundant seaweed and kelp, and infrequently visits estuaries and freshwater rivers. It appears to select habitats with surprisingly high exposure to strong swells and winds, unlike many other otters, which prefer calmer waters. Caves and crevices in the rocky shorelines may provide them with the cover they need, and often a holt will have no land access at high tide. Marine otters avoid sandy beaches.

== Behavior and ecology ==
Rocky intertidal zones with natural crevices are ideal for marine otter dens and feeding areas. Because most of their time is spent hidden in caves, their behavior is difficult to observe.

Marine otters actively avoid humans. In response to human activity, they will spend less time on coasts and stray from their dens during the day to fissures inaccessible to humans. Though generally avoidant of humans, their inhabitance of fishing villages is an indicator of the marine otter's ability to adapt to urbanization.

=== Reproduction ===
Marine otters may be monogamous or polygamous, and breeding occurs in December or January. Litters of two to five pups are born in January, February or March after a gestation period of 60 to 70 days. The pups remain with their mother for about 10 months of parental care, and can sometimes be seen on the mother's belly as she swims on her back, a practice similar to that of the sea otter. Parents bring food to the pups and teach them to hunt.

=== Feeding ===
Studies have shown latitudinal variations in diet, feeding periods, and dive time throughout the marine otter's distribution. Marine otters of southern Chile primarily feed on fish, while those in northern Chile mostly feed on crustaceans and mollusks. The otters on Isla La Vieja, Peru presumably prey on a colony of Peruvian diving petrels regularly. In January 2009, one was seen preying on magellanic flightless steamer duck chick in Puñihuil. The species shows opportunistic feeding behavior, sometimes eating small mammals and even fruit of plants like Greigia sphacelata and Fascicularia bicolor.

== Taxonomy ==
The marine otter is of the Lutrinae, a subfamily of Mustelidae. Its exact taxonomy has been debated due to lack of data. A phylogenetic study by C. G. Van Zyll De Jong in 1987 proposed the following phenogram of the lutrinae, based on morphological data.

- Aonyx cinereus
- - Lontra felina
  - - Lontra canadensis
    - - Lontra longicaudis
      - Lontra provocax

Jong's proposed phenogram showed that the marine otter was sister to the remaining species in the genus Lontra. A 2004 study contradicted Jong's research. The following was proposed as a part of the taxonomy of the Mustelidae, based on cytochrome b sequences.

- Lontra canadensis
- - Lontra longicaudis
  - Lontra felina

== Threats ==
Human activity on coastlines poses disturbance to marine otters. Humans introduce domestic animals which may also disturb their dens. Humans, as well as domesticated species, may expose a marine otter population to disease. Marine otters may be entangled in fishing nets and die. A 2026 study of marine otter mortality in north-central Chile from 2003 to 2024 found that, among cases with an assigned cause, anthropogenic mortality predominated, particularly attacks by free-ranging dogs, followed by fisheries bycatch and non-specific trauma.

Microplastics have been found in the scat of marine otters. The effects of microplastics in marine mammals are still unclear.

=== Competition and predation ===
Gulls and South American sea lions may compete with marine otters for prey, the latter known to also attack the otters. Orcas and sharks allegedly prey on the otters, though direct attacks have not been observed.

=== Parasites ===
Marine otters are known to be susceptible to Toxoplasma gondii infection along the northern and central coast of Chile, though T. gondii seroprevalence in this otter species is lower than in other aquatic mustelids such as the southern river otter and American mink in southern Chile, likely because of the general dryness of the former environment. Nematodes and acantocephalans are also known endoparasites of this species.

== Conservation status ==
Marine otters are rare and are protected under Peruvian, Chilean, and Argentine law. In the past, they were extensively hunted both for their fur and due to perceived competition with fisheries. Hunting extirpated them from most of Argentina and the Falkland Islands. Poaching is still a problem, but one of unknown magnitude. It is unknown how many marine otters exist in the wild or what habitats should be preserved to encourage their recovery. Marine otters were listed under CITES Appendix I in 1976, and are listed as endangered by the U.S. Department of the Interior.
