= Rancho Queimado =

Coordinates: 27.6725°S 49.0217°W

- Municipality
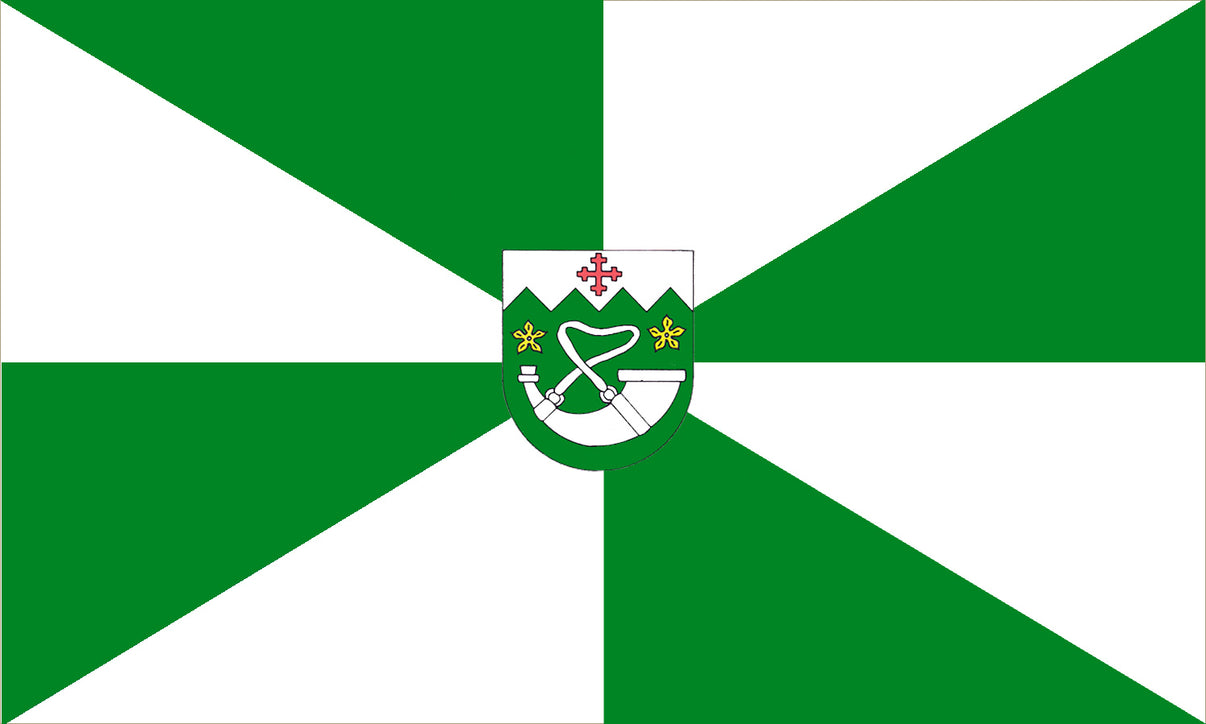
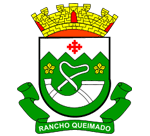
- Flag Coat of arms
- Interactive map of Rancho Queimado
- Country: Brazil
- Region: South
- State: Santa Catarina
- Mesoregion: Grande Florianópolis

Population (2020)
  - Total: 2,887
- Time zone: UTC -3

Rancho Queimado is a municipality in the state of Santa Catarina in the South region of Brazil.

== See also ==
- List of municipalities in Santa Catarina
