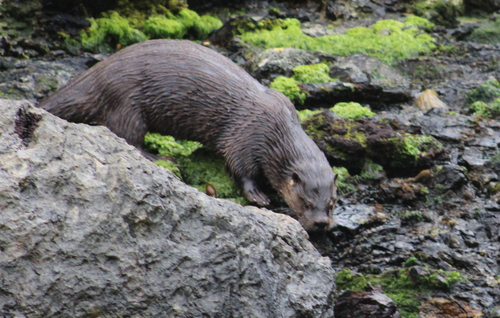
- A southern river otter in Argentina

Conservation status
- Endangered (IUCN 3.1)
- CITES Appendix I

Scientific classification
- Kingdom: Animalia
- Phylum: Chordata
- Class: Mammalia
- Order: Carnivora
- Family: Mustelidae
- Genus: Lontra
- Species: L. provocax

Binomial name
- Lontra provocax (Thomas, 1908)
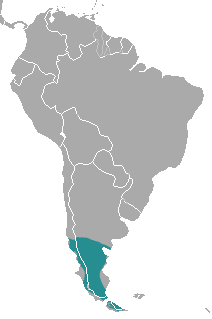
- Southern river otter range

= Southern river otter =

Species of semi-aquatic mammal

The southern river otter (Lontra provocax), or South American river otter, is an otter species that lives in much of Patagonia. It is listed by the International Union for Conservation of Nature as an endangered species.

== Description ==
A medium-sized otter, the southern river otter's body can grow up to 70 cm (28 in) long, with the tail adding about 40 cm (16 in). Body weight averages about 5–10 kg (11–22 lb). Its fur is dark brown on the upper parts and a lighter cinnamon color or can be almost white on the underside.

== Behavior ==
Family groups usually consist only of a female and her young, as males are usually solitary except for the breeding season. Litter sizes average one to two pups, but up to four can be born at a time. They are piscivorous, and their natural prey includes many types of fish, crustaceans, mollusks, and occasionally birds or their eggs, particularly of ground-nesting species found near water. Occasional reptiles or amphibians may be hunted as well, including frogs, smaller turtles, lizards and even some snakes.

== Habitat ==
The southern river otter can be found in marine, freshwater, and terrestrial habitats, but are mostly found in freshwater lakes and rivers having a significant amount of dense vegetation, especially along the shorelines, which must be present to use as cover. Their habitats also need the root systems of mature trees, as well as fallen tree debris.

Although referred to as a "river" (freshwater) otter, the southern river otter is equally adapted to venturing into more brackish (even fully marine) waters to forage and hunt. This trait is similar to the South American marine otter (L. felina), a nearly fully marine, coast-inhabiting otter.

== Threats ==
Southern river otters were vigorously hunted for their pelts throughout the last 100 years. This is the major cause of their current low population numbers and endangered conservation status. Since then, they have not been able to recover due to a number of other threats. At this point, only seven known populations of this species are found throughout Chile and Argentina, and all of the populations are isolated from each other.

The riparian forests and rivers in which these otters are mostly found have been disturbed by human presence. Dam and road construction, as well as stream canalization and drainage for agriculture destroy many acres of what could be habitat for this species. Though Argentina began passing legislation in 1960 to outlaw the hunting of the southern river otter, hunting still does occur because of the lack of enforcement. Hunting is legal and does occur in Chile.

The continual decrease in prey numbers also causes problems for the southern river otter. Some invasive aquatic species that have been introduced into that area are limiting the mollusks and fish available for otter prey. This causes the otters to move to other freshwater systems to hunt for food.

== Conservation ==
Several surveys and studies have been performed to better understand the southern river otter and its declining population, in an effort to prevent the species from facing a rapid extinction. Several of the known populations are found within protected national forests. In Argentina, the hunting and capture of the southern river otter has been outlawed since 1950.

One survey was undertaken to determine if any southern river otters live within the protected bounds of three Argentine parks—Lanín, Puelo and Los Alerces National Parks. The surveyors spoke with local residents near these areas, and looked for prints and scat, while also looking for signs of another, non-native mustelid, the American mink. Mink were introduced and/or escaped into the area over many years, and are thought to directly compete with the southern river otters for resources and habitat, as they lead similar amphibious lifestyles and hunt the same basic prey species. The results found signs of the southern river otter in just 32/275 of surveyed sites within the three parks. Of these 32 confirmed locations, 31 were riverine habitats within dense forests, with thick riparian vegetation, indicating the importance of dense, overgrown riparian zones for sheltering the otters' riverbank burrows.

In 2022, the southern river otter was reported for the first time in Fonck Lake since inquiries began in the 1980s.

== Future directions ==
Future directions for conserving this species include obtaining better information on the southern river otter's population numbers and locations. If conservationists know where the individuals and families live, enforcement of antipoaching laws, as well as focusing on maintaining and protecting their habitats, will be easier. Captive breeding programs would also be beneficial for this species, to later reintroduce individuals into the areas where they were previously found in.

== In culture ==
In Mapuche culture the southern river otter, or huillín, is associated with sexual prowess. Its fat is said to help loncos to satisfy their multiple wives.
