= Lageado =

Lageado is a neighbourhood (bairro) in the city of Porto Alegre, the state capital of Rio Grande do Sul, in Brazil. It was created by Law 7155 from October 1, 1992. It is considered part of the rural zone of the city, as there are still agricultural properties here.
