= Anitápolis =

- Municipality
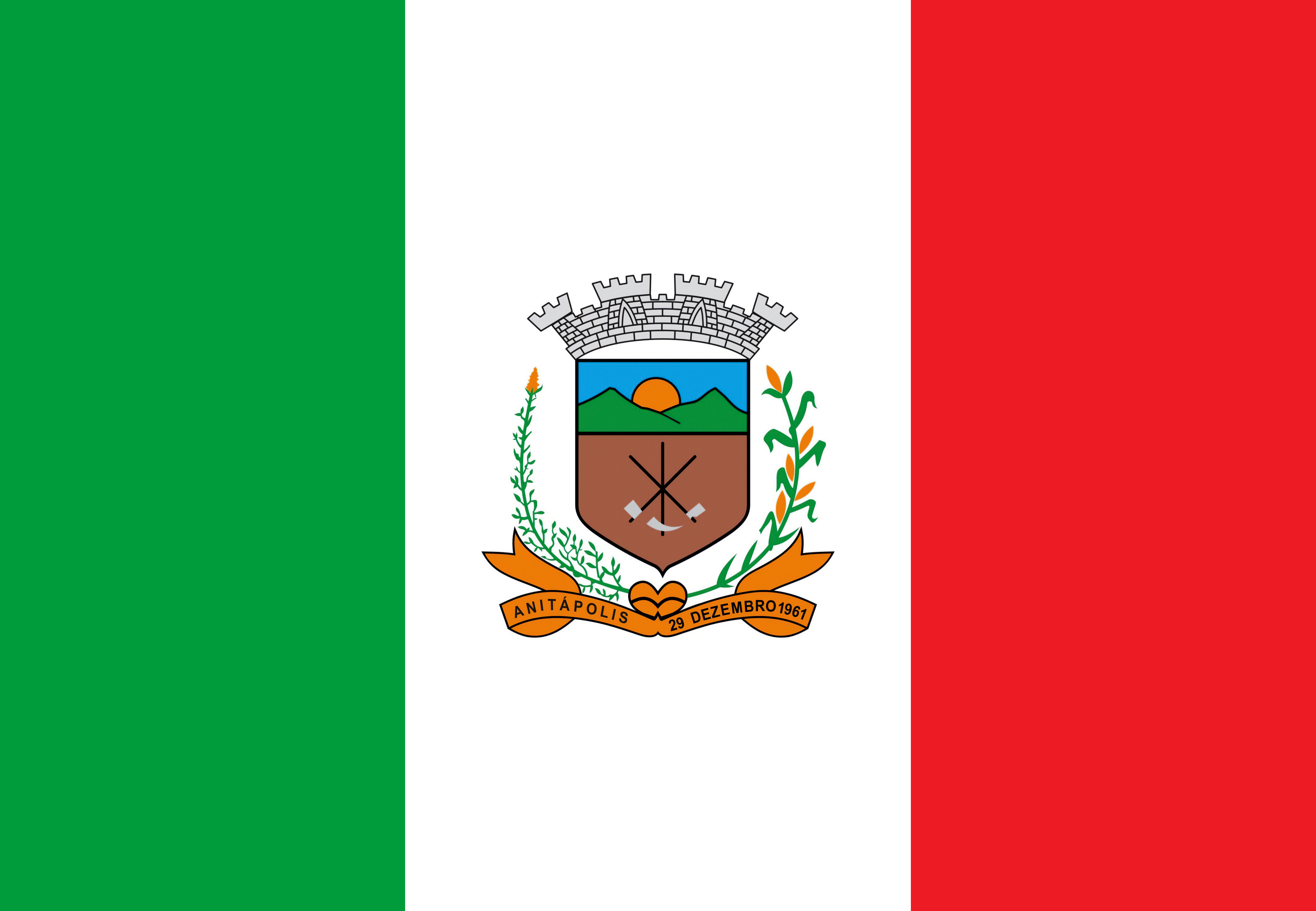
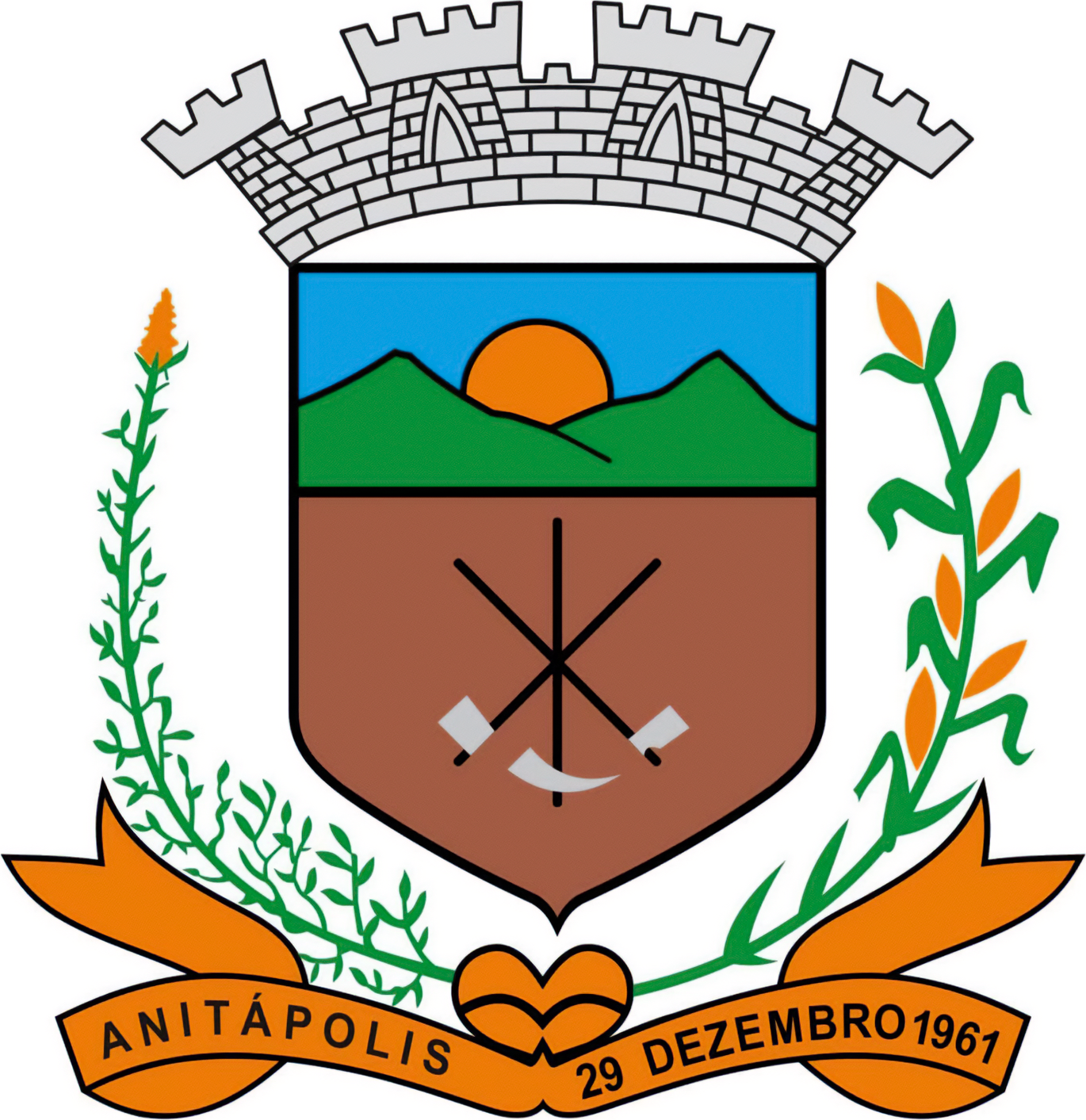
- Flag Coat of arms

- Location in Brazil
- Coordinates: 27°54′S 49°08′W
- Country: Brazil
- Region: South
- State: Santa Catarina
- Mesoregion: Grande Florianópolis

Population (2020)
  - Total: 3,228
- Time zone: UTC−3 (BRT)
- Website: www.anitapolis.sc.gov.br

Anitápolis is a municipality in the state of Santa Catarina in the South region of Brazil.

== See also ==
- List of municipalities in Santa Catarina
