= Buraco das Araras Private Natural Heritage Reserve =

Conservation area in Brazil

Buraco das Araras Private Reserve of Natural Heritage
- Reserva Particular do Patrimônio Natural Buraco das Araras
- IUCN category IV (habitat/species management area)
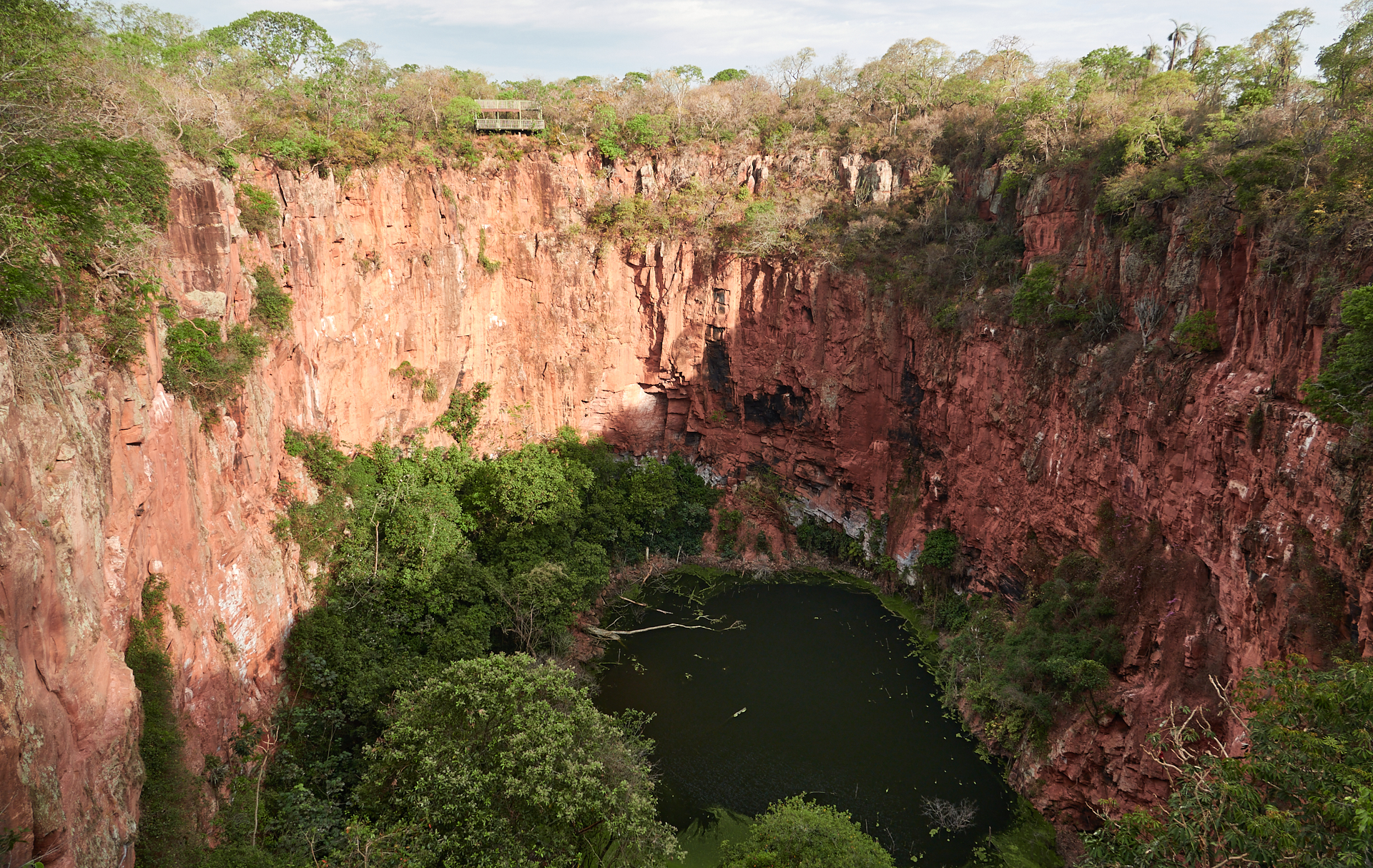
- View to the southeast from the northwestern viewpoint

- Location within Brazil
- Nearest city: Jardim, Mato Grosso do Sul
- Coordinates: 21.4919°S 56.4031°W
- Designation: Private natural heritage reserve
- Administrator: Empreendimento Turístico Buraco das Araras
- Website: www.buracodasararas.com.br/en/

The Buraco das Araras Private Natural Heritage Reserve (Portuguese: Reserva Particular do Patrimônio Natural Buraco das Araras) is a privately operated conservation area in the state of Mato Grosso do Sul, Brazil. It takes its name from the Buraco das Araras (Hole of Macaws), a large sinkhole that is the main feature of the reserve.

== Location ==
The reserve is in the municipality of Jardim, Mato Grosso do Sul and contains a huge sinkhole 500 metres (1,600 ft) in circumference and 100 metres (330 ft) deep. The hole would have been known to the original inhabitants of the area. It was rediscovered in 1912 by a local worker, and named the Buraco das Araras (Macaw Hole) after the many macaws flying around it. According to local legend the hole was used over the years as a place to dispose of cattle thieves and others whom the local ranchers or politicians wanted to eliminate. The sinkhole was vandalized, with the walls and macaws used as targets for guns, and rubbish thrown into the hole including stolen cars.

== Reserve ==
The privately owned reserve was created on 11 April 2007. It is classed as IUCN protected area category IV (habitat/species management area). It covers an area of 29.03 hectares (71.7 acres) in the Cerrado biome. There is a vivid green lagoon at the bottom of the sinkhole surrounded by thriving vegetation. The hole is occupied by caimans, armadillos, anteaters, coatis, foxes, the macaws for which it is named, ibises, toucans and many other species of birds. The owner manages the reserve and is responsible for compliance with the legal requirements for a private natural heritage reserve. Visitors are accompanied in groups of no more than ten people by a tour guide or local environmental monitor on a walk around the sinkhole.

== Sources ==
- Buraco das Araras (in Portuguese), Buraco das Araras, archived from the original on 2016-05-06
- Marcus Luiz Barroso Barros (11 April 2007), Portaria Nº 31, de 11 de Abril de 2007 (PDF) (in Portuguese)
- RPPN Buraco das Araras (in Portuguese), Chico Mendes Institute for Biodiversity Conservation
- Unidade de Conservação: Reserva Particular do Patrimônio Natural Buraco das Araras (in Portuguese), MMA: Ministério do Meio Ambiente
