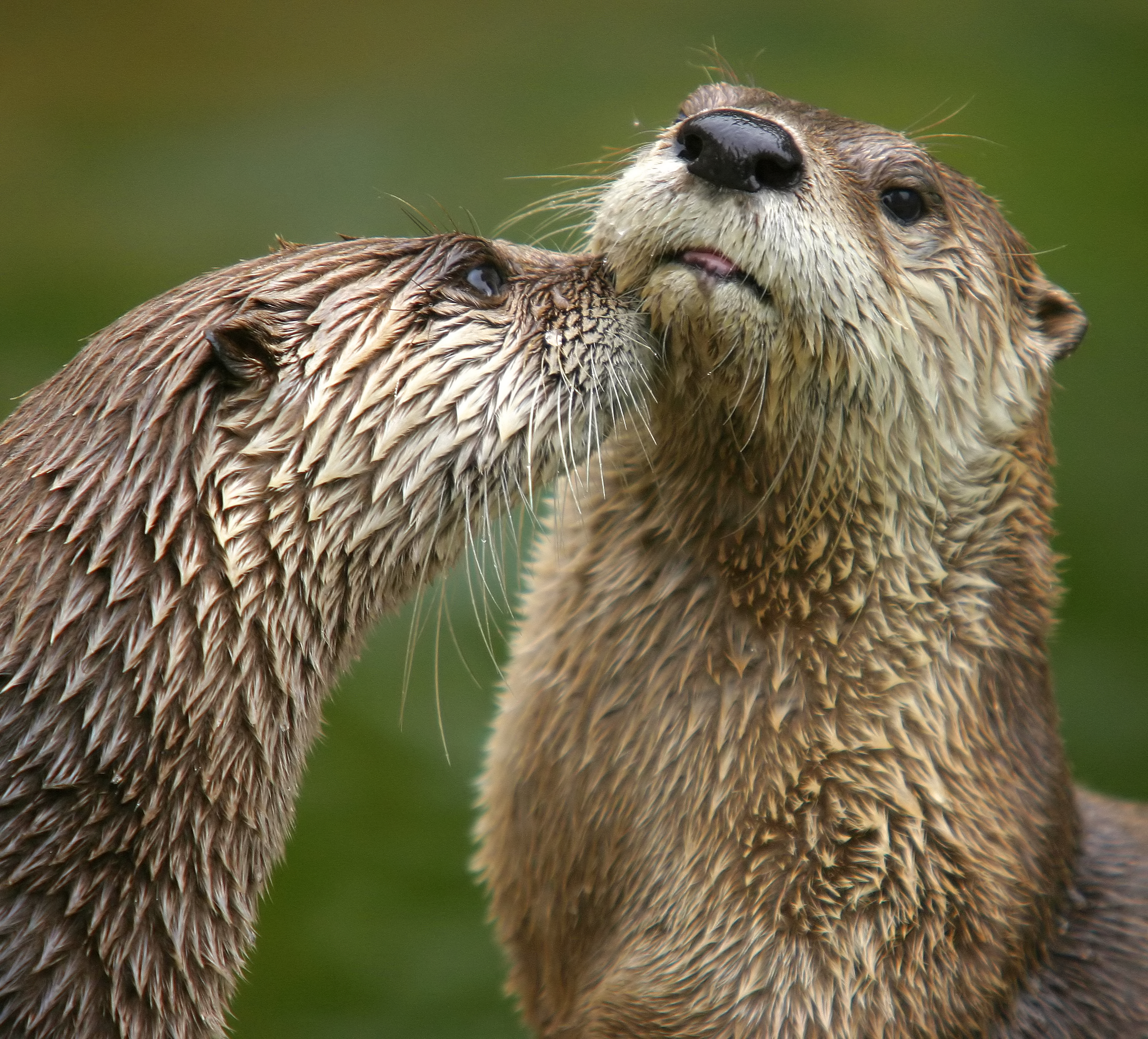
- North American river otters (Lontra canadensis)

Scientific classification
- Kingdom: Animalia
- Phylum: Chordata
- Class: Mammalia
- Order: Carnivora
- Family: Mustelidae
- Subfamily: Lutrinae
- Genus: Lontra; Gray, 1843

Type species
- Lutra canadensis Gray, 1843

Species
- L. annectens L. canadensis L. felina L. longicaudis L. provocax †L. weiri
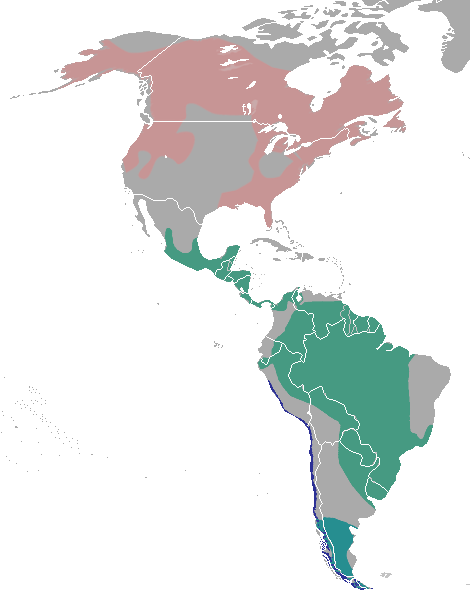
- Lontra range

= Lontra =

Genus of carnivores

Lontra is a genus of otters from the Americas.

== Species ==
These species were previously included in the genus Lutra, together with the Eurasian otter, but they have now been moved to a separate genus. The genus comprises five living and one known fossil species:

=== Extant species ===
Genus Lontra – Gray, 1843 – five species
Common name	Scientific name and subspecies	Range	Size and ecology	IUCN status and estimated population
North American river otter	Lontra canadensis (Schreber, 1777) Seven subspecies: L. c. canadensis (Schreber, 1777); L. c. kodiacensis (Goldman, 1935); L. c. lataxina (Cuvier, 1823); L. c. mira (Goldman, 1935); L. c. pacifica (J. A. Allen, 1898); L. c. periclyzomae (Elliot, 1905); L. c. sonora (Rhoads, 1898)	North America	Size: Habitat: Diet:	LC
Southern river otter	Lontra provocax (Thomas, 1908)	Chile and Argentina	Size: Habitat: Diet:	EN
Neotropical otter	Lontra longicaudis (Olfers, 1818) Four subspecies: L. l. enudris; L. l. incarum; L. l. longicaudis; L. l. raferrous	South America and the Caribbean island of Trinidad	Size: Habitat: Diet:	NT
Northern neotropical otter	Lontra annectens (Forsyth Major, 1897) Two subspecies: L. a. annectens; L. a. colombiana	Central America, South America	Size: Habitat: Diet:	NE
Marine otter	Lontra felina (Molina, 1782)	South America	Size: Habitat: Diet:	EN

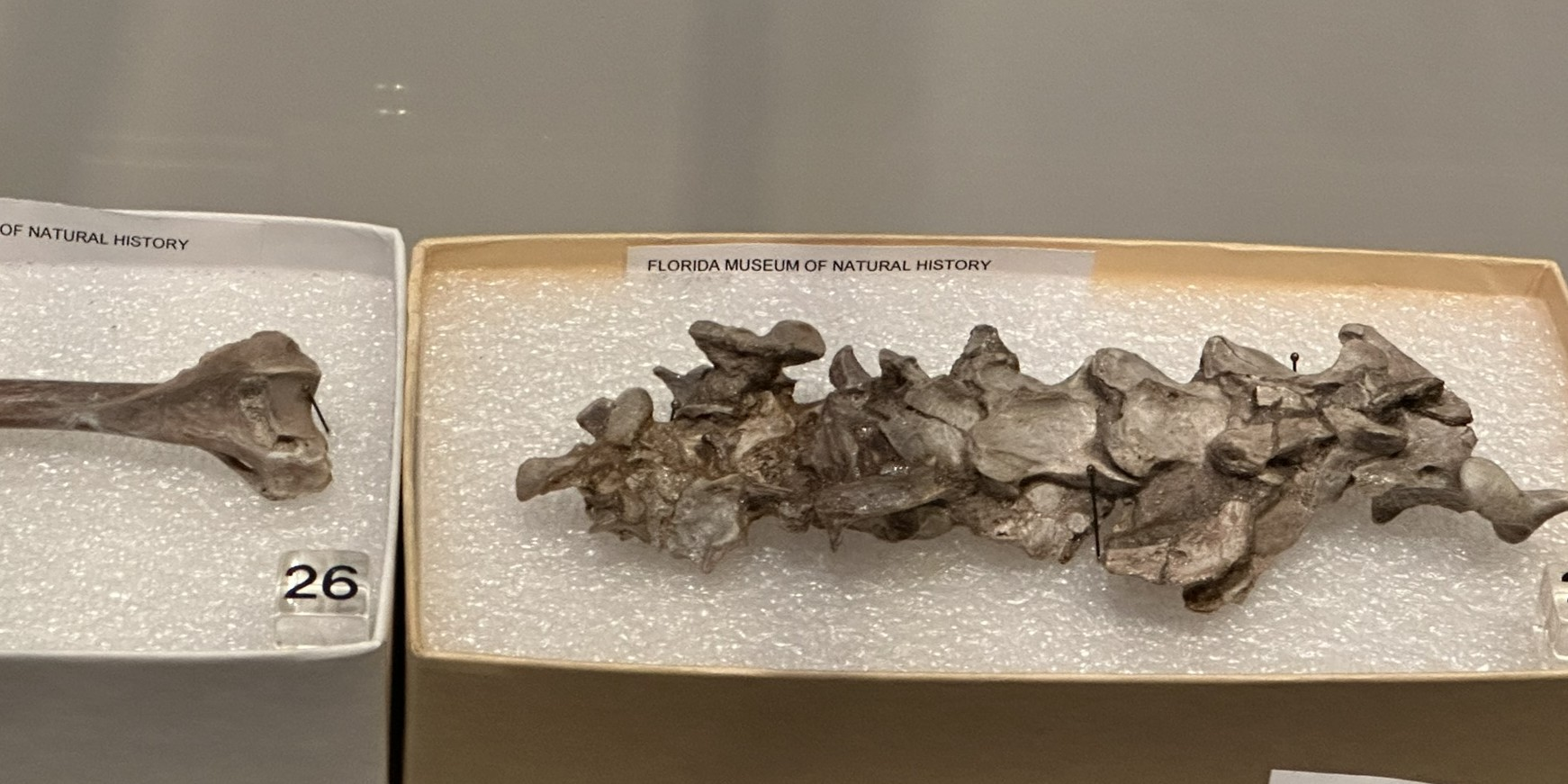
Fossil Lontra remains from the Miocene of Florida (FLMNH). The oldest Lontra fossils known.

=== Extinct species ===
Scientific name	Common name	Distribution
†Lontra weiri	Weir's otter	Pliocene North America
