= Buraco das Araras (Mato Grosso do Sul) =

Geological formation in Brazil

Coordinates: 21.4918°S 56.4035°W

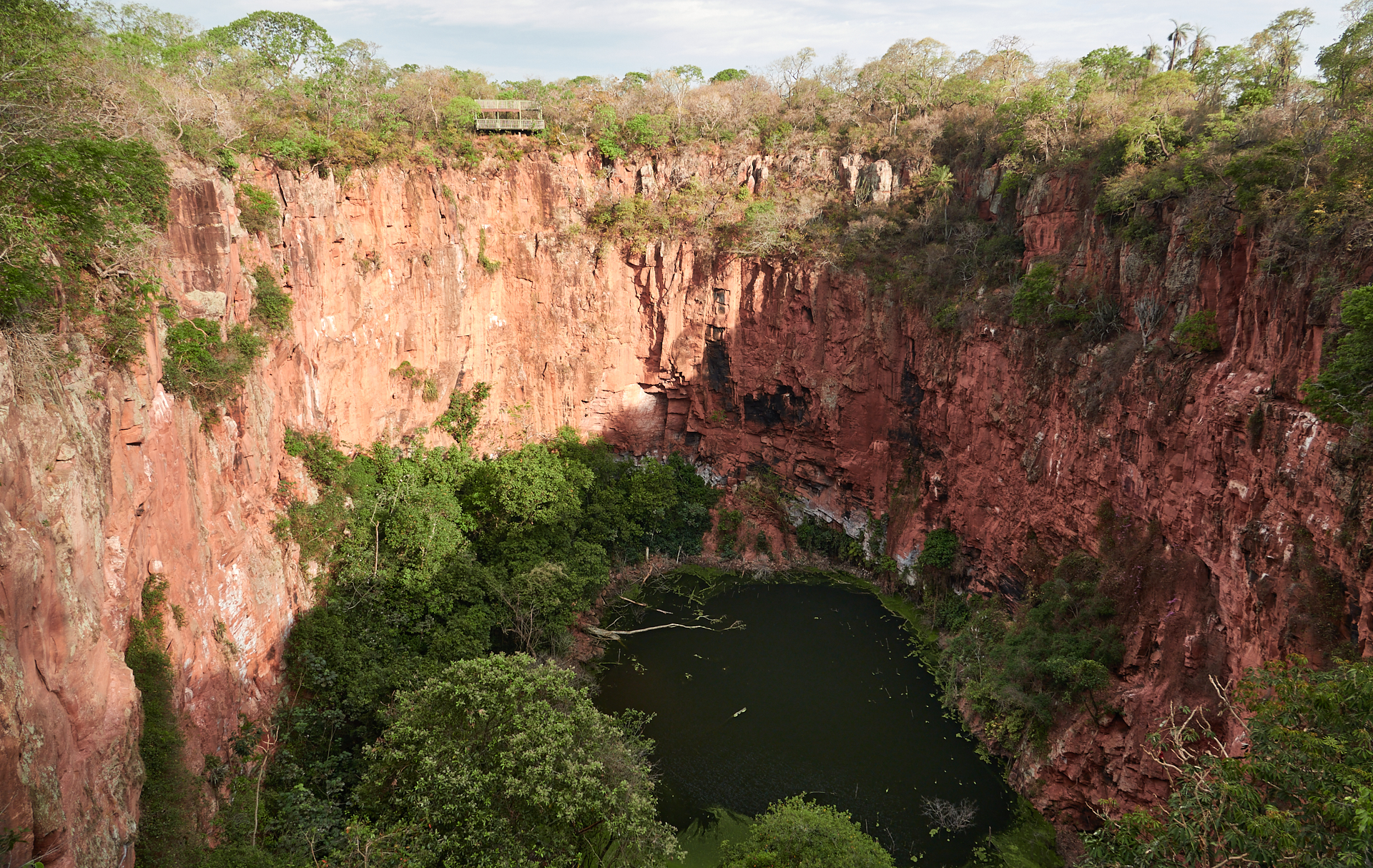
Buraco das Araras, Jardim, MS, Brazil, view in southeastern direction from the northwestern viewpoint

Buraco das Araras is a huge sandstone crater, a geological formation created by the collapse of boulders. It is about 500 m in circumference and 100 m deep, located in the middle of the cerrado in the state of Mato Grosso do Sul in Brazil. It is home to a wide variety of birds, especially araçari toucans and red-and-green macaws, hence the name of the cave.

According to the decree of IBAMA of 11 April 2007, the crater is part of the 29-hectares Buraco das Araras Private Natural Heritage Reserve (RPPN) and is connected to the RPPN Rio da Prata with 307 hectares.

== Geology ==
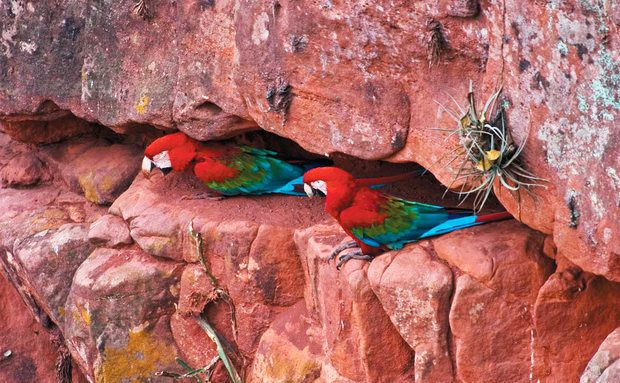
Red-and-green macaws living inside the sinkhole.

It is located 53 km from Bonito, belonging to the municipality of Jardim, in the middle of the cerrado of Mato Grosso do Sul, Brazil. It presents walls of up to 127 meters depth and a cave mouth of about 500 meters in diameter, there being a pond of green water, surrounded by lush forest, inhabited by broad-snouted caimans whose survival remains a mystery. Besides them and the macaws, mammals such as armadillos, anteaters, coatis, and other 120 species of birds, including toucans and ibises, chose the place to live.

The crater is a geological formation known as doline, formed by the collapse of huge boulders creating this cave. It is characterized by the corrosion of the limestone below the surface. It is considered the only cave of this type in Brazil and the largest in Latin America with its own ecosystem. Worldwide, there are only five dolines with these features and this one is considered the second largest. The tour of the cave begins with a pleasant and short hike on a trail of about 900 meters, stopping at two watch posts for observation and photos.

== Photo gallery ==
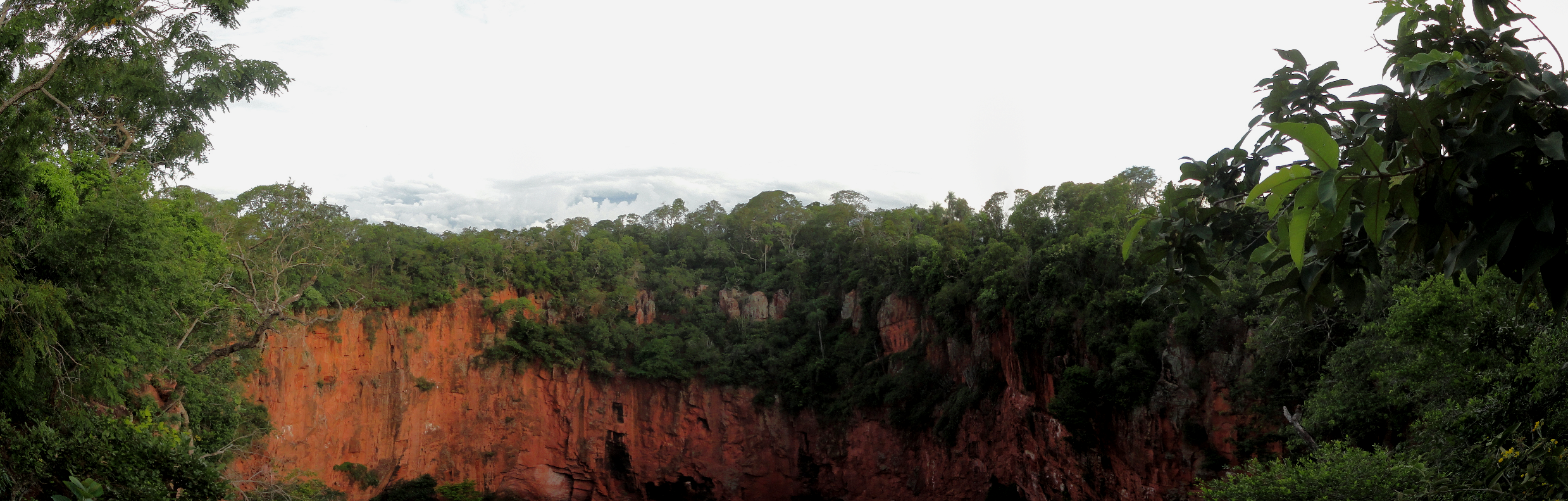
Border of Buraco das Araras, panoramic photo

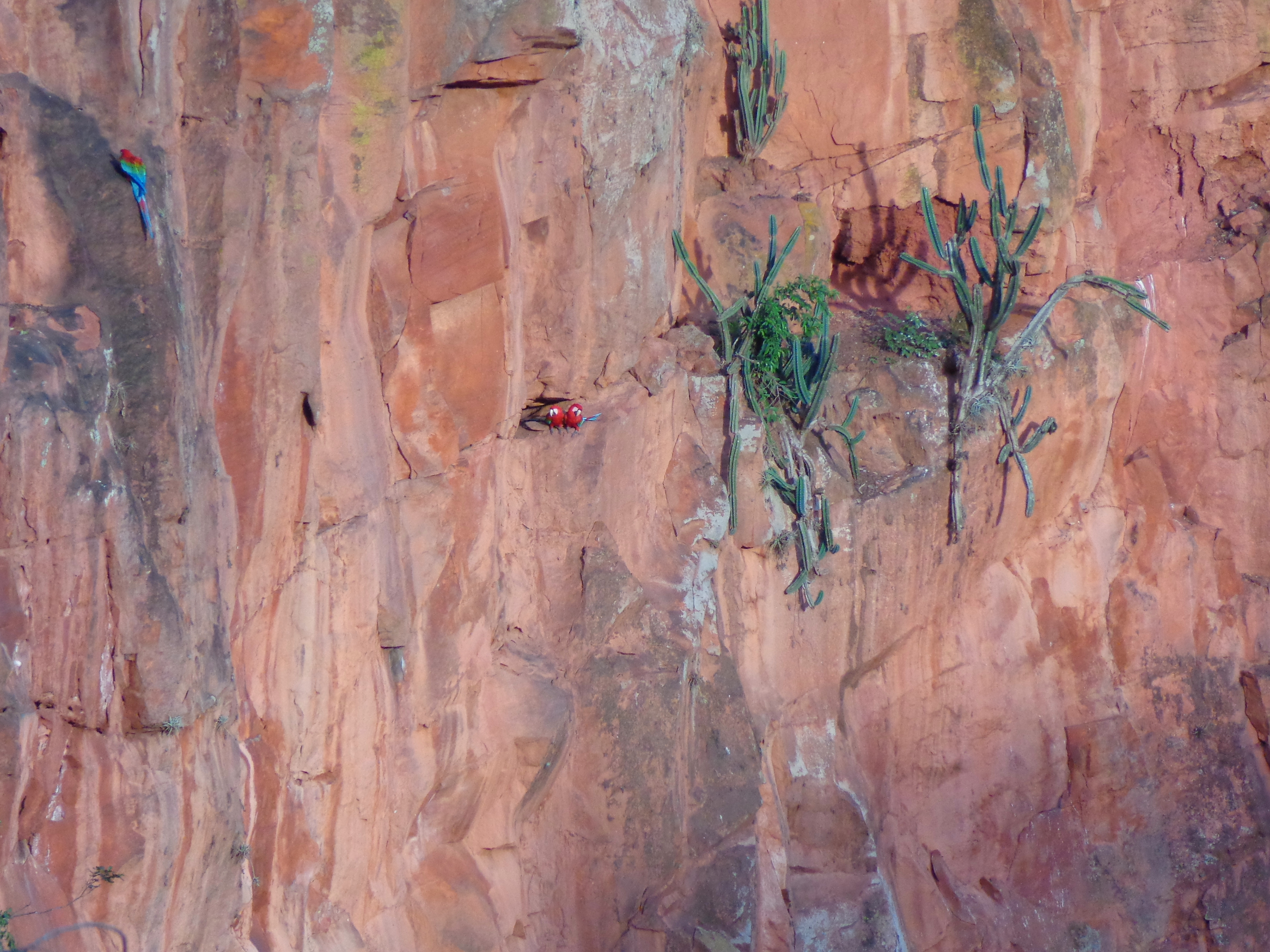
Buraco das Araras craggy walls, detail

== See also ==
- List of caves in Brazil
