= Chapadão do Lageado =

- Municipality
- Flag Coat of arms

- Location in Brazil
- Coordinates: 27.5908°S 49.5539°W
- Country: Brazil
- Region: South
- State: Santa Catarina
- Mesoregion: Vale do Itajai

Population (2020)
  - Total: 3,006
- Time zone: UTC -3
- Website: chapadaodolageado.sc.gov.br

Chapadão do Lageado is a municipality in the state of Santa Catarina in the South region of Brazil.

== See also ==
- List of municipalities in Santa Catarina
