= Mico Leão Preto Ecological Station =

Ecological station in São Paulo state, Brazil

- Estação Ecológica Mico Leão Preto
- IUCN category Ia (strict nature reserve)
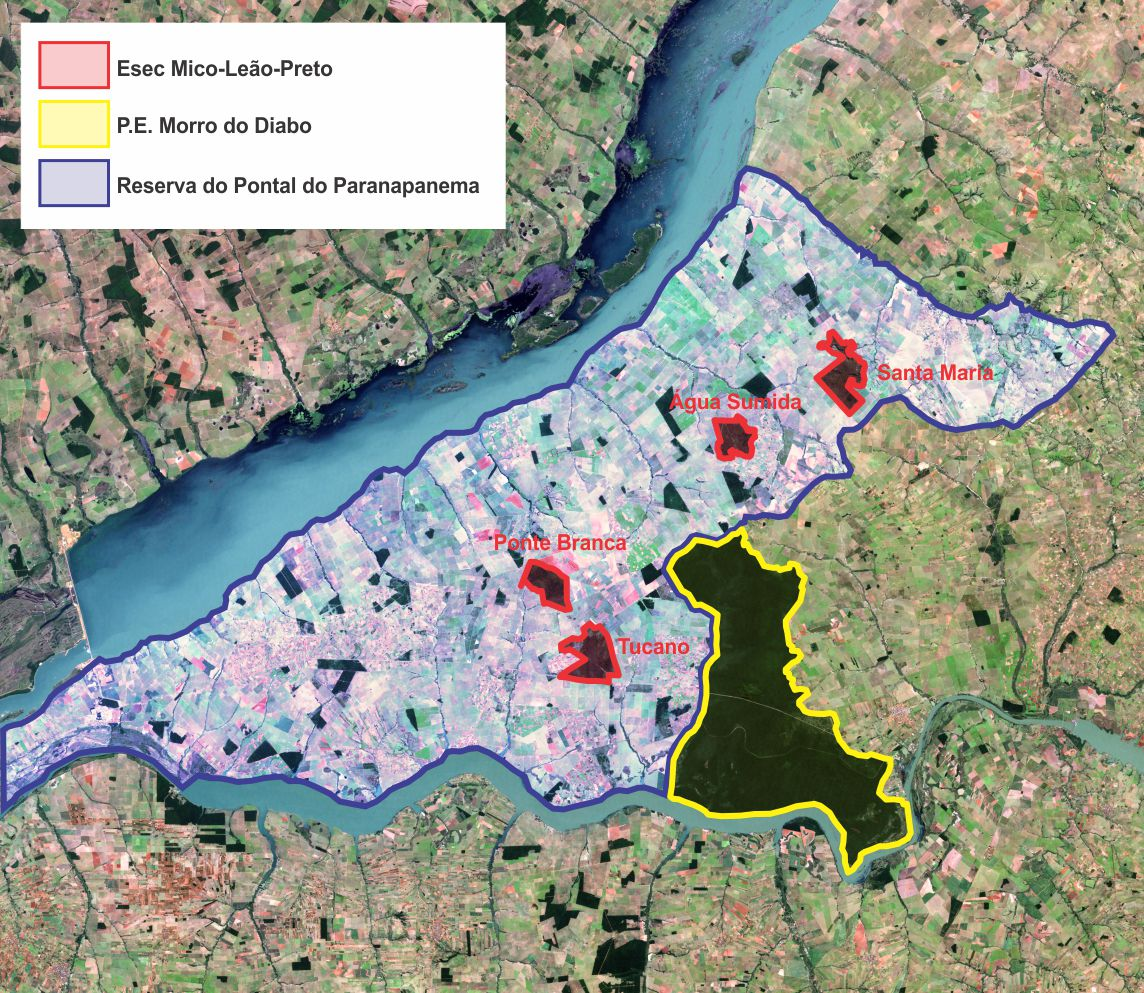
- Eng Sérgio Motta Dam reservoir to the north. Light blue: Great Pontal Reserve, mostly deforested. Small black areas in red: Mico Leão Preto ESEC. Large black area in yellow: Morro do Diabo PES

- Location within Brazil
- Nearest city: Teodoro Sampaio, São Paulo
- Coordinates: 22°13′54″S 52°14′04″W
- Area: 6,677 hectares (16,500 acres)
- Designation: Ecological station
- Created: 16 July 2002
- Administrator: Chico Mendes Institute for Biodiversity Conservation

The Mico Leão Preto Ecological Station (Portuguese: Estação Ecológica Mico Leão Preto) is an Ecological station in the state of São Paulo, Brazil. It protects four fragments of Atlantic Forest in a region that has lost most of its forest coverage over the last century, and protects the endemic endangered black lion tamarin (Portuguese: Mico-leão-preto), which gives the reserve its name.

== Location ==
The Mico Leão Preto Ecological Station (ESEC) is divided between the municipalities of Euclides da Cunha Paulista (29.99%), Marabá Paulista (22.88%), Presidente Epitácio (10.66%) and Teodoro Sampaio (36.42%) in the state of São Paulo. It is in the extreme west of the state to the north of the Paranapanema River and the Morro do Diabo State Park, and to the south of the Itaipu Dam reservoir on the Paraná River. The ESEC is divided into four separate fragments of Atlantic Forest: Água Sumida with 1,199 hectares (2,960 acres), Ponte Branca with 1,306 hectares (3,230 acres), Tucano with 2,115 hectares (5,230 acres) and Santa Maria with 2,057 hectares (5,080 acres), totalling 6,677 hectares (16,500 acres). The ESEC is administered by the Chico Mendes Institute for Biodiversity Conservation.

== History ==
European occupation of the region began in earnest when the Sorocabana Railway reached the Paraná River in 1917. Urban centers were built along the railway and intensive logging began, followed by farming of coffee, cotton, peanuts and cattle. The state government created the Morro do Diabo Forest Reserve in 1941, now the Morro do Diabo State Park. In 1942 the 247,000 hectares (610,000 acres) Great Pontal Reserve and the São Paulo Lagoon Reserve were created. Over the years that followed these two reserves were invaded by squatters and deforested, often with government support. In 1975 the state launched construction of hydroelectric power plants on the Paranapanema and Paraná Rivers. Employees on these projects squatted on land in the reserves after they were dismissed. However, low fertility of the soil and distance from natural markets has meant that only cattle and sugarcane are profitable, and the region is the poorest in the state of São Paulo.

The Mico Leão Preto Ecological Station was created by federal decree on 16 July 2002. It is classed as IUCN protected area category Ia (strict nature reserve). Its objective is to protect the remnants of Atlantic Forest in the region, and also to protect the populations of black lion tamarin (Leontopithecus chrysopygus). This species, whose Portuguese name mico-leão-preto is the name of the ESEC, is highly endangered. The ESEC has been part of the Atlantic Forest Biosphere Reserve since November 2002. It would be part of a proposed Trinational Biodiversity Corridor connecting conservation units in Brazil, Paraguay and Argentina.

The boundaries were changed on 14 May 2004. The management plan was published in November 2007. It was approved on 9 September 2008. Fishing regulations were published on 2 October 2008, covering conservation areas and their buffer zones in the Paraná River basin. They were the Morro do Diabo State Park, Rio do Peixe State Park, Rio Aguapeí State Park, Mico-Leão-Preto Ecological Station, Ivinhema State Park, Ilha Grande National Park, Caiuá Ecological Station and Iguaçu National Park. The consultative council was created on 22 February 2012. In 2015 a program was launched in schools of the municipalities that contain parts of the ESEC to increase awareness of the value of the natural area. In 2016 researchers captured a group of black lion tamarins and gave them GPS collars, providing a new way to monitor the individuals and better understand how they are using the space and responding to fragmentation.

== Environment ==
Annual rainfall is from 1,000 to 1,400 millimetres (39 to 55 in), mostly falling in the summer. The Köppen climate classification is Aw - humid tropical savanna climate. Average daily temperatures range from 5 to 36 °C (41 to 97 °F) with an average of 28 °C (82 °F). There is light frost in some years, and on rare occasions there is heavy frost The terrain is gently rolling, with open valleys and floodplains. Altitudes range from 290 to 596 metres (951 to 1,955 ft) above sea level. The plots that make up the ESEC are on higher land and do not contain large bodies of water.

Vegetation is seasonal semideciduous, or Interior Atlantic Forest, with partial loss of leaves during the dry winter months. The forests in the area have been devastated by cattle farming and extraction of valuable wood such as mahogany. The ESEC contains about 10% of the native vegetation remaining in the region. The forests in the ESEC have suffered different levels of disturbance in the past and continue to be influenced by human activity. 169 plant species have been recorded, of which 56 were found in all four plots and 55 in just one plot. The bordering roads are a factor in starting and spreading forest fires. The main crop in the vicinity is sugar cane, which is usually burned at harvest time. The most common threats are incursions of cattle, fires and hunting.

Fauna in the Pontal do Paranapanema region include the black lion tamarin (Leontopithecus chrysopygus), jaguar (Panthera onca), South American tapir (Tapirus terrestris), white-lipped peccary (Tayassu pecari) and collared peccary (Pecari tajacu). Vulnerable or endangered birds include shrike-like laniisoma (Laniisoma elegans), wing-barred piprites (Piprites chloris), shrike-like tanager (Neothraupis fasciata), bare-throated bellbird (Procnias nudicollis) and solitary tinamou (Tinamus solitarius). Studies and efforts to conserve the black lion tamarins are monitored by the International Committee for the Conservation and Management of Lion Tamarins (ICCM), in which the ESEC participates.

== Sources ==
- Araújo Corte, Dione Angélica de; Valladares-Pádua, Cláudio Benedito (November 2007), Plano de Manejo da Estação Ecológica Mico-Leão-Preto (PDF) (in Portuguese), Brasília: ICMBio
- Esec Mico-Leão-Preto (in Portuguese), ICMBio: Chico Mendes Institute for Biodiversity Conservation
- ESEC Mico Leão Preto (in Portuguese), ISA: Instituto Socioambiental
- IPÊ avança com pesquisas na ESEC Mico-Leão-Preto (in Portuguese), IPÊ: Instituto de Pesquisas Ecológicas, 2016
- Unidade de Conservação: Estação Ecológica Mico Leão Preto (in Portuguese), MMA: Ministério do Meio Ambiente
