= Ilha Grande National Park =

National park of Brazil

- Parque Nacional de Ilha Grande
- IUCN category II (national park)
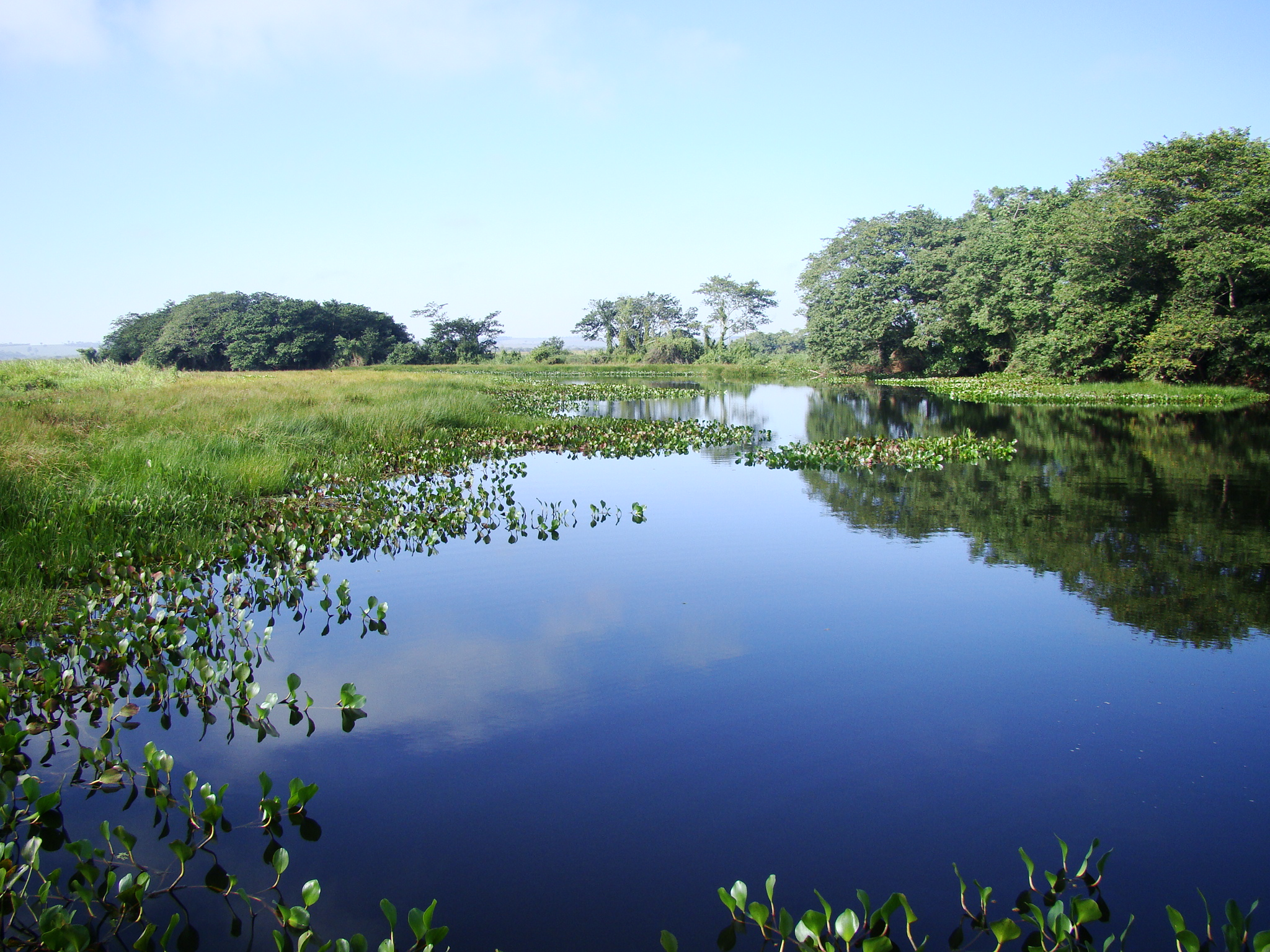
- Saraiva Lake in the Ilha Grande National Park

- Location within Brazil
- Location: Paraná and Mato Grosso do Sul, Brazil
- Coordinates: 23°24′S 53°49′W
- Area: 78,875
- Established: September 30, 1997
- Administrator: Chico Mendes Institute for Biodiversity Conservation

Ramsar Wetland
- Designated: 30 September 2017
- Reference no.: 2316

The Ilha Grande National Park (Parque Nacional de Ilha Grande) is located on the border between Paraná and Mato Grosso do Sul states in Brazil. The park was created in 1997 to protect the biological diversity of the upper Parana River area.

== History ==
The Ilha Grande National Park was created by decree without number issued by the Presidency of the Republic on 30 September 1997. Currently the park administration rests with the Chico Mendes Institute for Biodiversity Conservation (ICMBio).

== Characterization area ==
The park, with its 78,875 hectares (194,900 acres) in area, encompasses all islands and islets from the Itaipu reservoir and river mouth Piquiri to the mouth of rivers and Amambai Ivaí on the Parana River, among which are the major islands Grande, Peruzzi, Peacock and Bandeirantes. The park area also includes wetlands and flood plains, situated on the banks of the Parana river, lake and lagoon waters and its surroundings and the Seawall Macaws. The river water intended for navigation are not part of the National Park of Ilha Grande.

Ilha Grande National Park is adjacent to 9 municipalities: Guaíra, Altônia, São Jorge do Patrocínio, Alto Paraíso and Icaraíma in the state of Paraná; and Mundo Novo, Eldorado, Itaquirai, and Naviraí in the state of Mato Grosso do Sul.

Ilha Grande protects archaeological sites of great importance. It is known that the site was once inhabited by Guarani Indians and Xetás.

== Tourism and attractions ==
The park is open free to the public for tours every day of the week. The park, in many places, has little beaches, leisure place where you can swim to the banks of the Paraná River. Another option is the boat ride on the Parana River, passing through various localities of Ilha Grande.

== Wildlife and vegetation ==
Ilha Grande is in a transition between cerrado (characteristic of the Pantanal) and seasonal Forest. Already fauna has several endemic species and/or endangered. Among the terrestrial fauna species were recorded as the marsh deer (Blastocelus dichotomus), the alligator-the-crop-yellow (Caiman Latorostris), the jaguar (Panthera onca), tapir (Tapirus terestris) and the giant anteater flag (Myrmecophata trydoctyla). Aquatic fauna include: painted (Pseudoplatystoma corruscans) jaú (Paulicea luetkeni), armed (Pterodoras granular), gold (Salminus maxillosus), pacu (piractus mesopotamicus) and avifauna is cited: jabiru (Jabiru mycteria), jaó (Cryptrellus undulatus), curassow (Crax fasciolata), American spoonbill (Platalea ajaja) and Jacana (Jacana jacana).

Fishing regulations were published on 2 October 2008, covering conservation areas and their buffer zones in the Paraná River basin. They were the Morro do Diabo State Park, Rio do Peixe State Park, Aguapeí State Park, Mico Leão Preto Ecological Station, Ivinhema State Park, Ilha Grande National Park, Caiuá Ecological Station and Iguaçu National Park. The Santa Maria Ecological Corridor connects the Iguaçu National Park with the protected margins of Lake Itaipu, and via these margins with the Ilha Grande National Park. The park would be part of the proposed Trinational Biodiversity Corridor, which aims to provide forest connections between conservation units in Brazil, Paraguay and Argentina in the Upper Paraná ecoregion.

== Sources ==
- Araújo Corte, Dione Angélica de; Valladares-Pádua, Cláudio Benedito (November 2007), Plano de Manejo da Estação Ecológica Mico-Leão-Preto (PDF) (in Portuguese), Brasília: ICMBio, archived from the original (PDF) on 2016-11-07
- PES do Aguapeí (in Portuguese), ISA: Instituto Socioambiental
- Teixeira, Cristiano (5 April 2016), Corredor Ecológico de Santa Maria, Paraná - Brasil (PDF) (in Portuguese), Asunción: ITAIPU Binacional/MI, p. 3, archived from the original (PDF) on 5 November 2016
