= Morro do Diabo State Park =

State park in São Paulo, Brazil

- Parque Estadual Morro do Diabo
- IUCN category II (national park)
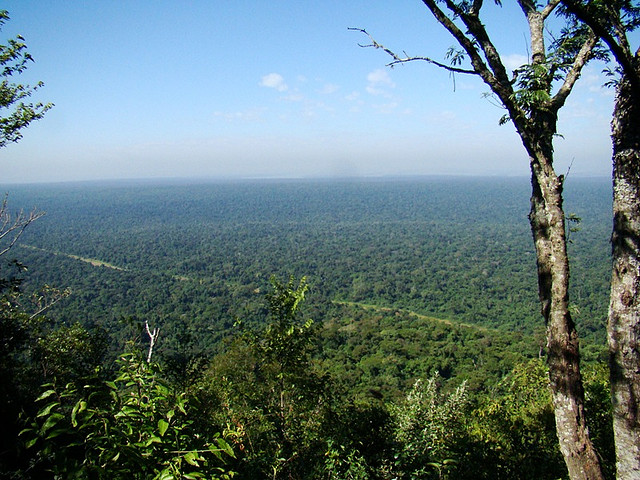
- SP-613 highway cutting across the park

- Location within Brazil
- Nearest city: Teodoro Sampaio, São Paulo
- Coordinates: 22°31′26″S 52°18′11″W
- Area: 33,845.33 hectares (83,633.6 acres)
- Designation: State park
- Created: 1941

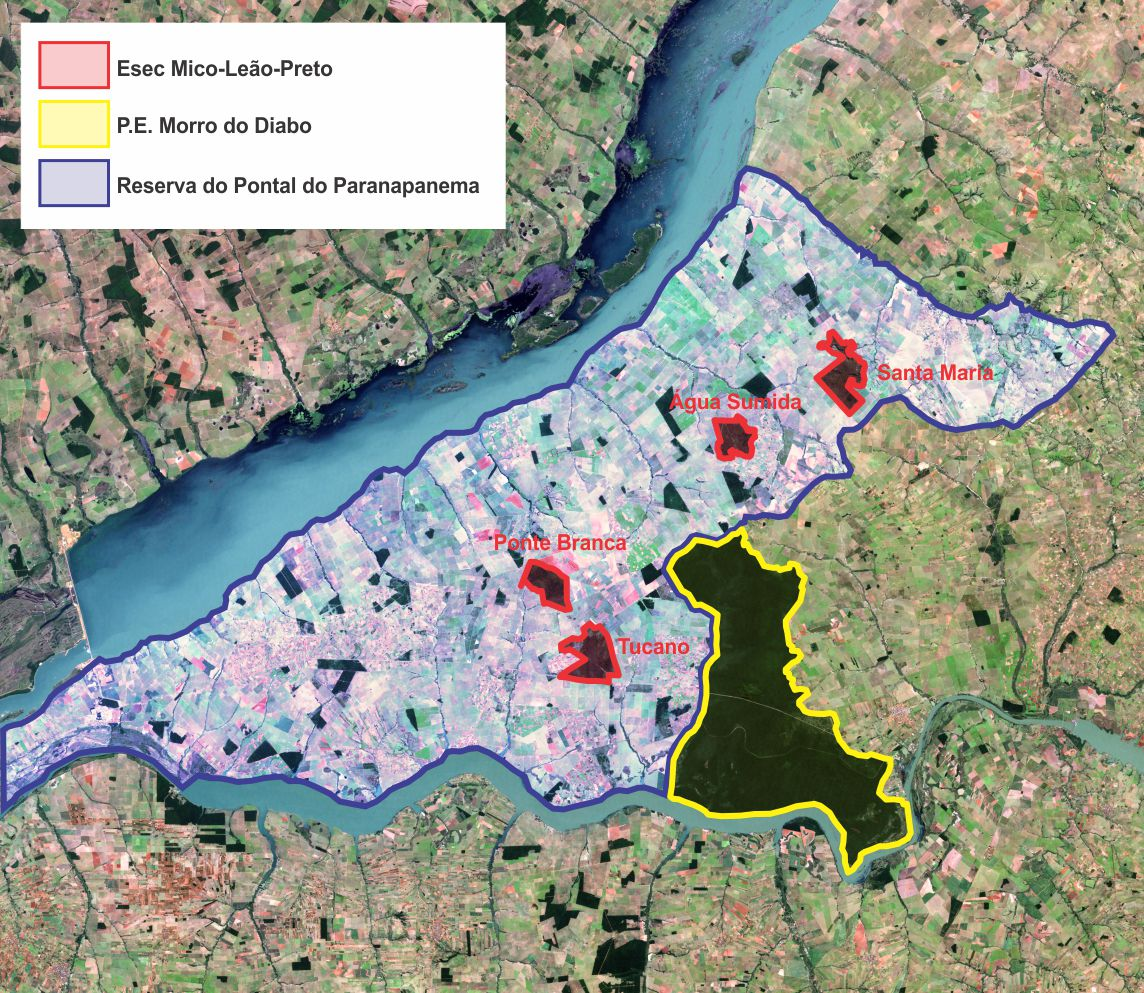
Eng Sérgio Motta Dam reservoir to the north. Light blue: Great Pontal Reserve, mostly deforested. Small black areas in red: Mico Leão Preto ESEC. Large black area in yellow: Morro do Diabo PES

The Morro do Diabo State Park (Portuguese: Parque Estadual Morro do Diabo) is a state park in the state of São Paulo, Brazil. It protects an area of Atlantic Forest in a region that has lost most of its forest coverage over the last century, and protects the endemic endangered black lion tamarin

== Location ==
The Morro do Diabo State Park is in the municipality of Teodoro Sampaio in the Pontal do Paranapanema region, 687 kilometres (427 mi) from the state capital of São Paulo. It has an area of 33,845.33 hectares (83,633.6 acres). The park has tropical seasonal semi-deciduous vegetation. The park lets visitors have direct contact with nature in a sustainable manner, and supports environmental education and scientific research. The park would be part of the proposed Trinational Biodiversity Corridor, which aims to provide forest connections between conservation units in Brazil, Paraguay and Argentina in the Upper Paraná ecoregion.

== Environment ==
The park preserves one of the last large areas of the country's upland forest, with the original regional ecosystems. The climate is type CWA. Rainfall is mostly in the summer, averaging 1,100 to 1,300 millimetres (43 to 51 in). Average daily temperatures range from 13 °C (55 °F) from May to August to 32 °C (90 °F) from January to March, with an annual mean temperature of 21 °C (70 °F). The park preserves an area of Atlantic Forest in good condition. It has a large reserve of Aspidosperma polyneuron (Portuguese: peroba-rosa) trees, important for reforestation and recovery of degraded areas. It is home to endangered species such as tapir, peccary, howler monkey, puma and jaguar, and one of the most threatened of all primates, the black lion tamarin, with an estimated 1,200 members of this species.

== History ==
European occupation of the Pontal do Paranapanema region began in earnest when the Sorocabana Railway reached the Paraná River in 1917. Urban centers were built along the railway and intensive logging began, followed by farming of coffee, cotton, peanuts and cattle. The state government created the Morro do Diabo Forest Reserve in 1941, now the Morro do Diabo State Park. In 1942 the 247,000 hectares (610,000 acres) Great Pontal Reserve and the São Paulo Lagoon Reserve were created. Over the years that followed these two reserves were invaded by squatters and deforested, often with government support. The forest reserve became a state park in 1986.

Fishing regulations were published on 2 October 2008, covering conservation areas and their buffer zones in the Paraná River basin. They were the Morro do Diabo State Park, Rio do Peixe State Park, Rio Aguapeí State Park, Mico-Leão-Preto Ecological Station, Ivinhema State Park, Ilha Grande National Park, Caiuá Ecological Station and Iguaçu National Park.

== Sources ==
- Araújo Corte, Dione Angélica de; Valladares-Pádua, Cláudio Benedito (November 2007), Plano de Manejo da Estação Ecológica Mico-Leão-Preto (PDF) (in Portuguese), Brasília: ICMBio
- Histórico (in Portuguese), SAP: Sistema Ambiental Paulista
- PES do Aguapeí (in Portuguese), ISA: Instituto Socioambiental
- Sobre o Parque (in Portuguese), SAP: Sistema Ambiental Paulista
