= Iguaçu National Park =

National park in Paraná, Brazil

- IUCN category II (national park)
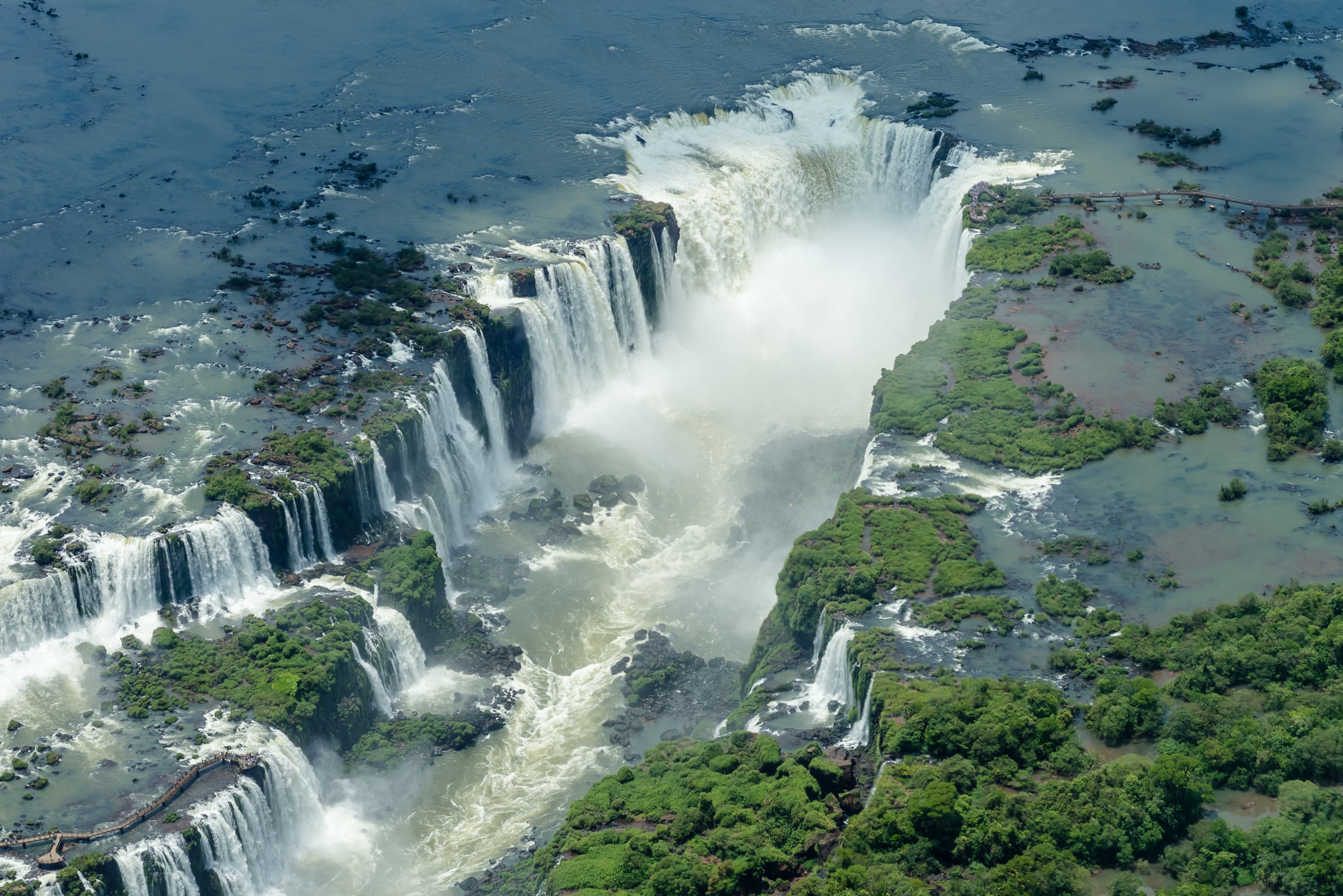
- Iguazu Falls

- Location within Brazil
- Location: Paraná State, Brazil
- Coordinates: 25°41′S 54°26′W
- Area: 1,700 km^{2} (660 mi^{2})
- Established: 10 January 1939

UNESCO World Heritage Site
- Type: Natural
- Criteria: vii, x
- Designated: 1986 (10th session)
- Reference no.: 355
- Region: Latin America and the Caribbean
- Endangered: 1999–2001

Iguaçu National Park (Portuguese: Parque Nacional do Iguaçu, pronounced [ˈpaʁki nasi.oˈnaw du iɡwaˈsu, - nasjoˈnaw -]) is a national park in Paraná State, Brazil. It comprises a total area of 185,262.5 hectares (457,794 acres) and a length of about 420 kilometers (260 mi), 300 kilometers (190 mi) of which are natural borders by bodies of water and the Argentine and Brazilian sides together comprise around 260,000 hectares (640,000 acres). Iguaçu National Park was created by federal decree nr. 1035 of 10 January 1939 and became a UNESCO World Heritage Site in 1986. The park is managed by Chico Mendes Institute for Biodiversity Conservation (ICMBio).

The park shares a border with Iguazú National Park in Argentina. It also has one of the world's largest waterfalls, extending over some 2,700 meters (8,900 ft). It is home to many rare and endangered species of flora and fauna, among them the giant otter and the giant anteater. The clouds of spray produced by the waterfall are conducive to the growth of lush vegetation.

== History ==
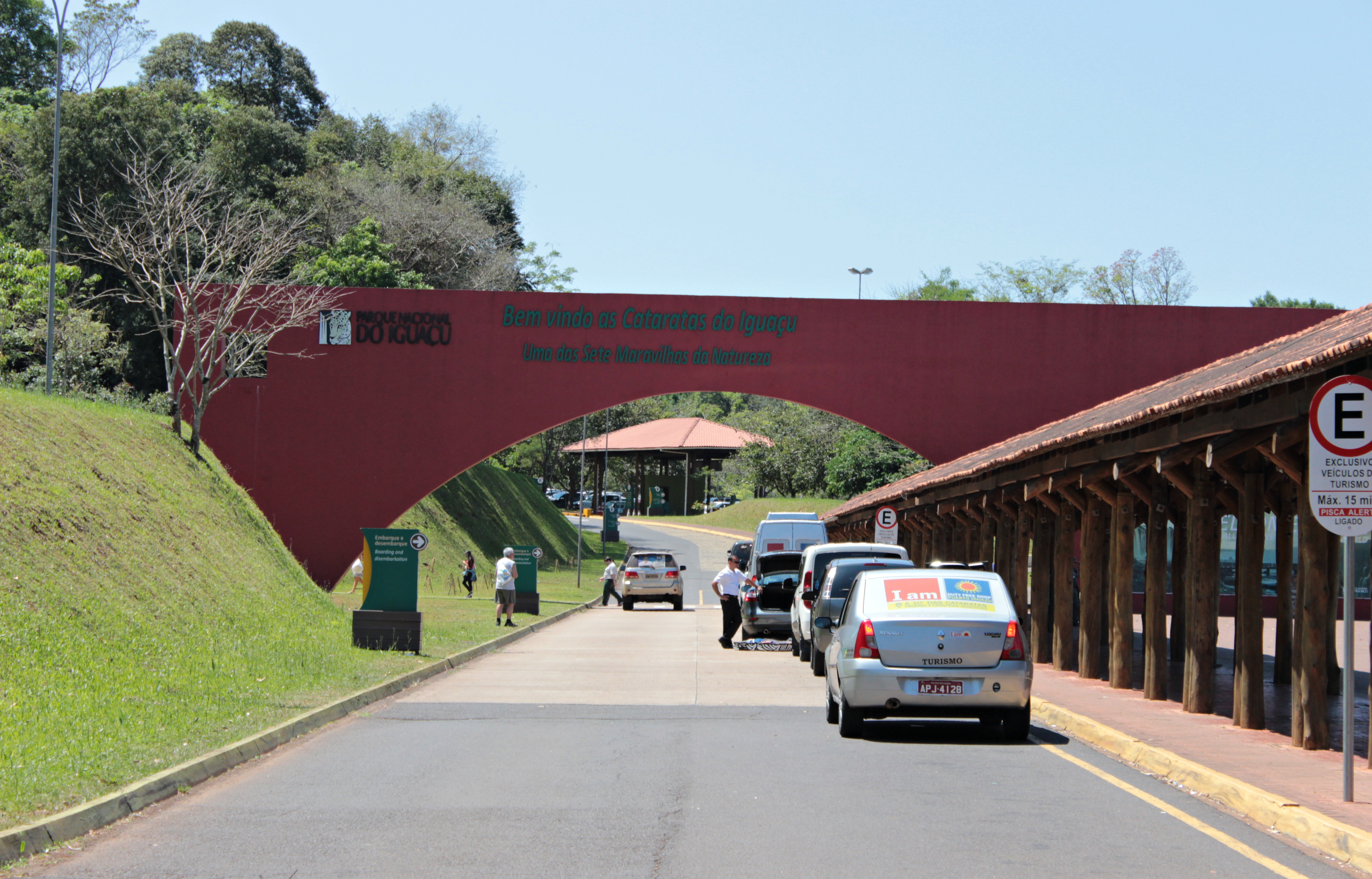
Iguaçu National Park Gateway

The Iguaçu National Park owes its name to the fact it includes an important area of the Iguazu River (Portuguese: Rio Iguaçu). Approximately 50 square kilometres (19 mi^{2}) of the length of the river makes up the Iguaçu Falls.

It is the most important park of the Prata Basin and, since it is a haven to a significant genetic asset of animal and vegetal species, it was the first park in Brazil to receive a Management Plan. As foreseen by Rebouças, the park's basic goal is the preservation of the highly relevant ecologically and scenic natural ecosystems, thus enabling scientific research and the development of environmental education and interpretation activities, recreation in natural surroundings and the ecological tourism.

The Iguaçu National Park is spectacular as well as pioneering. The first proposal for a Brazilian national park aimed at providing a pristine environment to "future generations", just as "it had been created by God" and endowed with "all possible preservation, from the beautiful to the sublime, from the picturesque to the awesome" and "an unmatched flora" located in the "magnificent Iguaçu waterfalls". These were the words used by André Rebouças, an engineer, in his book "Provinces of Paraná, Railways to Mato Grosso and Bolivia", which started up the campaign aimed at preserving the Iguaçu Falls way back in 1876, when Yellowstone National Park, the first national park on the planet, was four years old.

On November 17, 1986, during the UNESCO conference held in Paris, the Iguaçu National Park was listed as Natural Heritage of Humanity and is one of the largest forest preservation areas in South America.

== Location ==
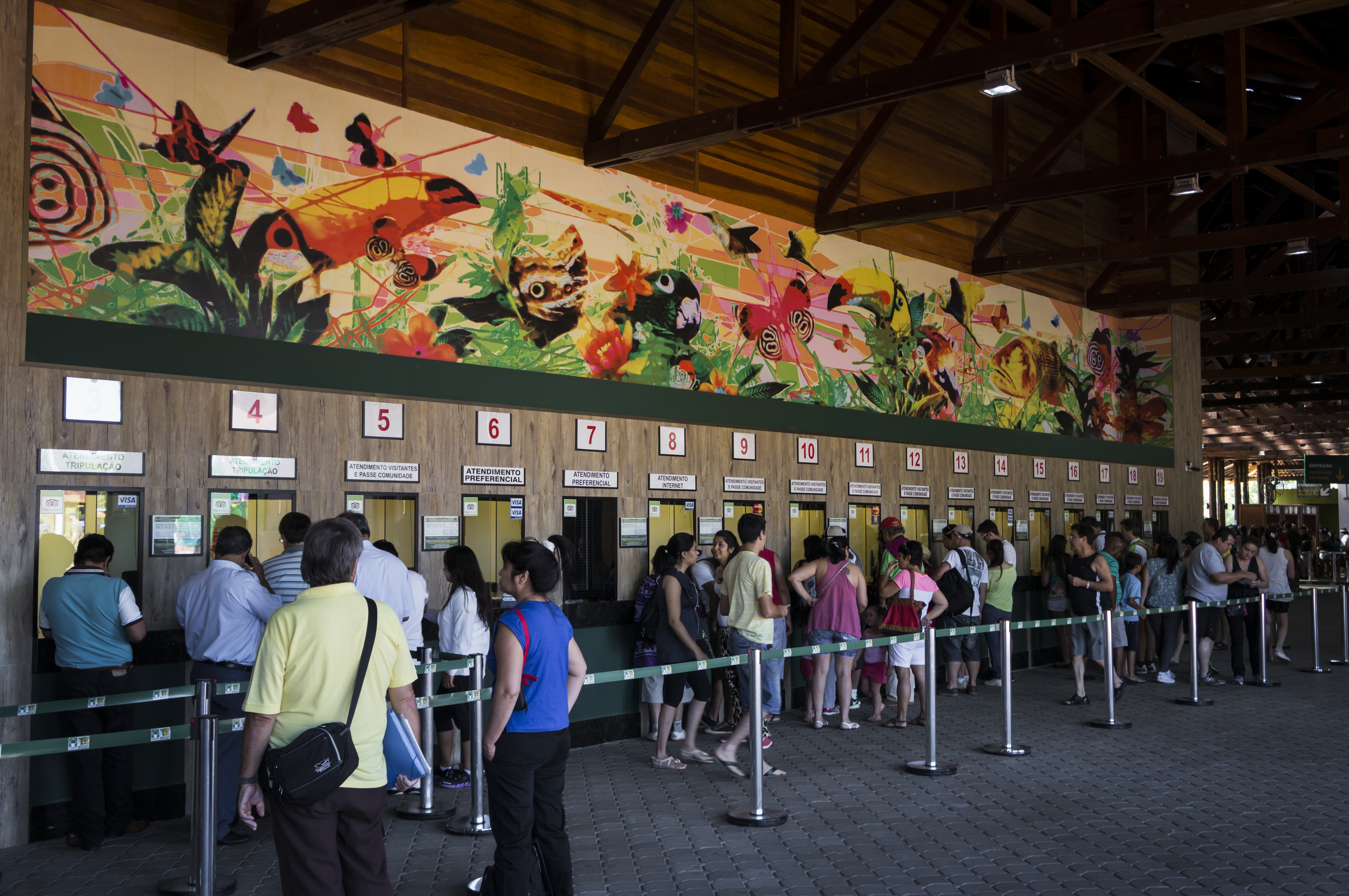
Ticket Office

In Brazil, the Park has boundaries with the following municipalities: Foz do Iguaçu, Medianeira, Matelândia, Céu Azul, São Miguel do Iguaçu, Santa Terezinha de Itaipu, Santa Tereza do Oeste, Capitão Leônidas Marque, Capanema and Serranópolis.

The Park is located in the westernmost region of the state of Paraná, in the Iguaçú river basin, 17 km (11 miles) from downtown Foz do Iguaçú. It borders Argentina, where the Iguazu National Park, which was implemented in 1934, is located. The border between the two countries and their national parks is made by the Iguaçú river, whose source is near the Serra (mountain range) do Mar near Curitiba and runs for 18 km (11 miles) throughout the state of Paraná. The river estuary is located 18 km downriver from the Falls, where it flows into the Paraná river. This meeting of rivers forms the triple Brazil, Argentina and Paraguay border.

Fishing regulations were published on 2 October 2008, covering conservation areas and their buffer zones in the Paraná River basin. They were the Morro do Diabo State Park, Rio do Peixe State Park, Aguapeí State Park, Mico Leão Preto Ecological Station, Ivinhema State Park, Ilha Grande National Park, Caiuá Ecological Station and Iguaçu National Park. The Santa Maria Ecological Corridor connects the Iguaçu National Park with the protected margins of Lake Itaipu, and via these margins with the Ilha Grande National Park. The park would be part of the proposed Trinational Biodiversity Corridor, which aims to provide forest connections between conservation units in Brazil, Paraguay and Argentina in the Upper Paraná ecoregion.

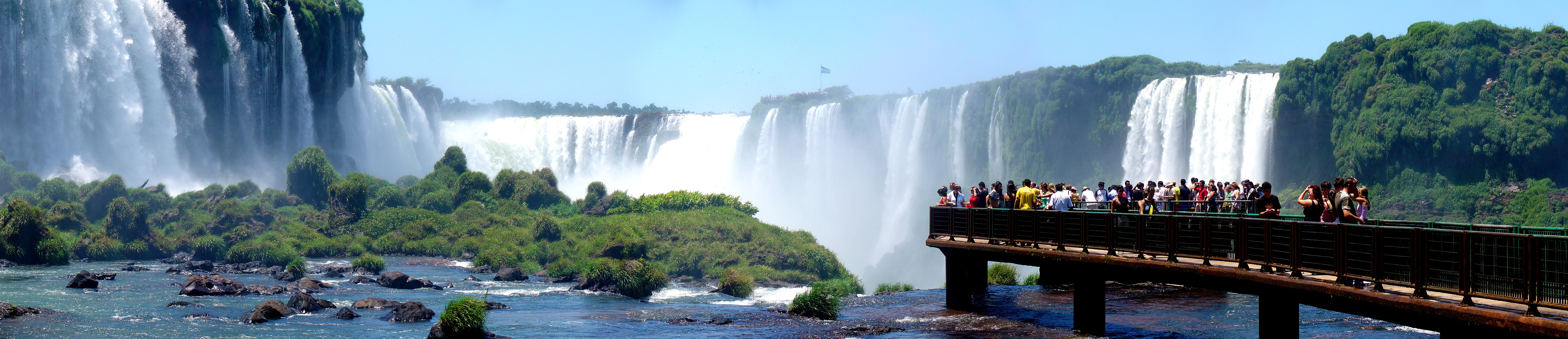
The Garganta do Diabo Walkway allow panoramic view of the falls from the Brazilian side.

== Tourism ==
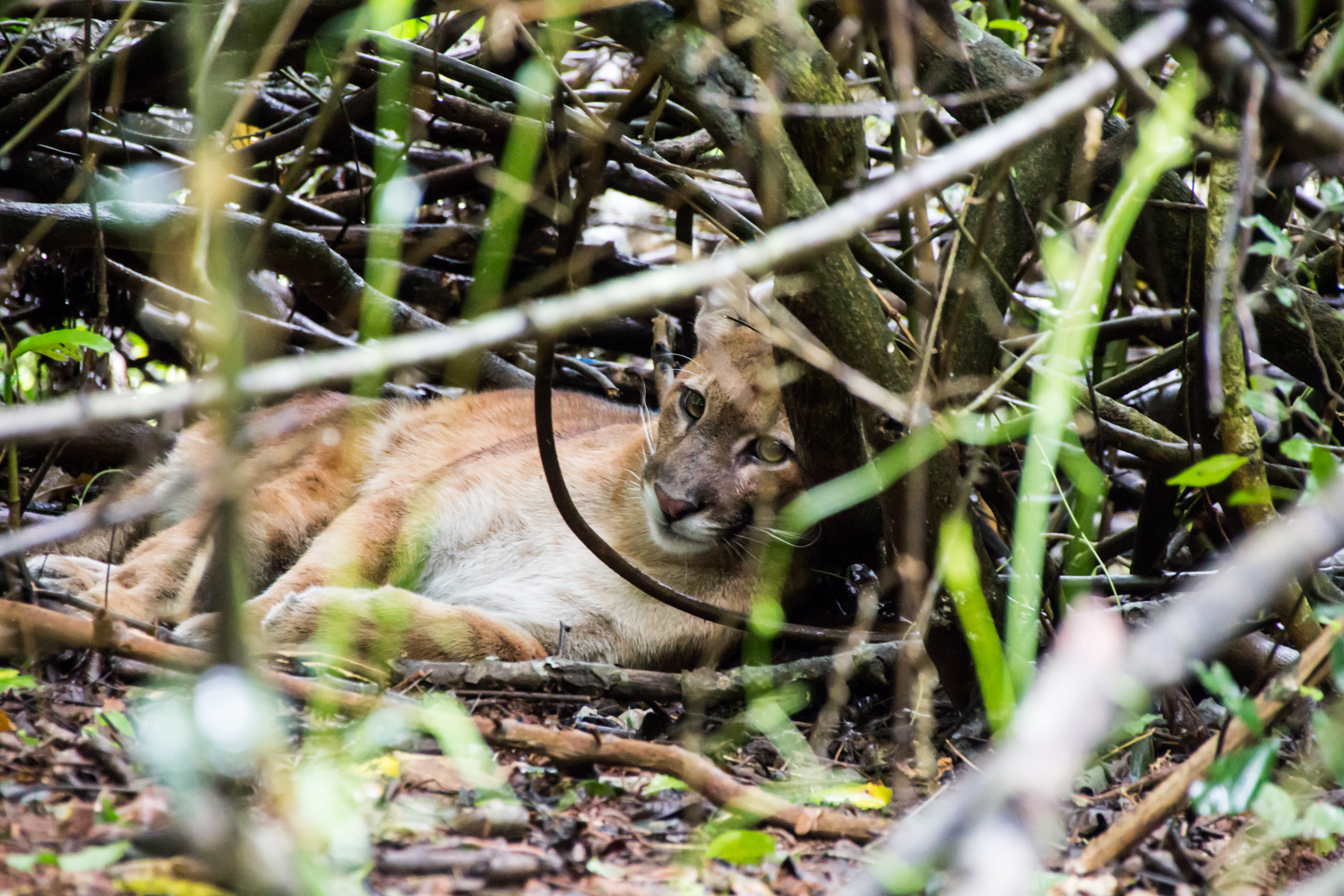
A South American cougar caught on camera

The area of the park open for visitation and where the concession areas of Cataratas do Iguaçú S/A are located, accounts for approximately 0.3% of the total area of the park.

The most spectacular sightseeing of the park is the Iguaçú Falls, which form a 2,700m wide semicircle, while the water falls from a height of 72 metres (236 ft). The number of waterfalls ranges from 150 and 300 depending on the Iguaçú river flow. Besides the exuberant waterfalls, there are other attractions such as rich fauna, the Poço Preto (the Black Well), the Macuco Waterfall, the Visitors Center, the Santos Dumont Statue, a homage paid by VASP (a defunct airline company) to the "Father of Aviation", who lent all his prestige and efforts in turning the falls area into a National Park. The park received 1,550,700 visitors in 2014.

== See also ==
- Iguazu Falls
- Wildlife of Brazil

== Sources ==
- Araújo Corte, Dione Angélica de; Valladares-Pádua, Cláudio Benedito (November 2007), Plano de Manejo da Estação Ecológica Mico-Leão-Preto (PDF) (in Portuguese), Brasília: ICMBio, archived from the original (PDF) on 7 November 2016
- PES do Aguapeí (in Portuguese), ISA: Instituto Socioambiental
- Teixeira, Cristiano (5 April 2016), Corredor Ecológico de Santa Maria, Paraná - Brasil (PDF) (in Portuguese), Asunción: ITAIPU Binacional/MI, archived from the original (PDF) on 5 November 2016
