= Caiuá Ecological Station =

Rainforest preserve in Brazil

- Estação Ecológica do Caiuá
- IUCN category Ia (strict nature reserve)
- Location within Brazil
- Nearest city: Diamante do Norte, Paraná
- Coordinates: 22.622096°S 52.877933°W
- Area: 1,427 hectares (3,530 acres)
- Designation: Ecological station
- Created: 21 November 1994
- Administrator: Instituto Ambiental do Paraná

The Caiuá Ecological Station (Portuguese: Estação Ecológica do Caiuá) is an ecological station in the state of Paraná, Brazil. It was created as compensation for flooding caused by the Rosana dam on the Paranapanema River, and protects an area of Atlantic Forest to the south of the dam.

== Location ==
The Caiuá Ecological Station (ESEC) is in the municipality of Diamante do Norte, Paraná. It has an area of 1,427 hectares (3,530 acres). It is 5 kilometres (3.1 mi) from the municipal seat. It protects one of the last significant areas of pristine seasonal semi-deciduous forest, with little disturbance by humans. The reserve protects an area of forest near the Paranapanema River, both above and below the Rosana Hydroelectric Plant. This was built between July 1980 and March 1987, with a 220 square kilometres (85 sq mi) reservoir and capacity of 353MW.

== History ==
Construction of the Rosana dam caused the flooding of about 25,000 hectares (62,000 acres) of fertile land and floodplains, and eviction of 270 families. In Paraná 2,089 hectares (5,160 acres) of forest and floodplains were submerged, and 10,979 hectares (27,130 acres) of agricultural land. In the area of the ESEC, what had been an inland forest became a marginal forest along the reservoir. The government negotiated with CESP (Companhia Energética de São Paulo) for compensation for the flooding damage.

The Fazenda Macuco, which had been preserved by its owners for leisure and hunting, was located next to the hydroelectric plant. It was expropriated in June 1989, and became the property of the state, managed by the Instituto de Terras Cartografia e Florestas (ITCF), now the Instituto Ambiental do Paraná (IAP). (Note: CESP and the former owner discussed compensation for 17 years, with the final payments and settlement completed in 2002–03.) The Caiuá Ecological Station was created by state governor decree 4.264 of 21 November 1994. The original area was 1,427.30 hectares (3,526.9 acres). This was expanded by state decree 3.932 of 4 December 2008 to 1,449.48 hectares (3,581.7 acres).

Fishing regulations were published on 2 October 2008, covering conservation areas and their buffer zones in the Paraná River basin. They were the Morro do Diabo State Park, Rio do Peixe State Park, Aguapeí State Park, Mico Leão Preto Ecological Station, Rio Ivinhema State Park, Ilha Grande National Park, Caiuá Ecological Station and Iguaçu National Park. The ESEC would be part of the proposed Trinational Biodiversity Corridor, which aims to provide forest connections between conservation units in Brazil, Paraguay and Argentina in the Upper Paraná ecoregion.

== Environment ==
The terrain is flat or gently undulating. The Köppen climate classification is "Cfa", humid subtropical climate. Average temperatures range from a minimum of 15 to 16 °C (59 to 61 °F) to a maximum of 28 to 29 °C (82 to 84 °F), with an average of 21 to 22 °C (70 to 72 °F). Average annual rainfall is 1,200 to 1,400 millimetres (47 to 55 in), with greatest rainfall in December–February. The ESEC is in the Atlantic Forest biome, and is mostly covered with submontane seasonal semi-deciduous forest, with some alluvial formations caused by periodic floods of the Paranapanema River. The most representative tree species is the Aspidosperma polyneuron, with average diameter at chest height of about 1 metre (3 ft 3 in). The narrow alluvial strip in the north is dominated by Calophyllum brasiliense. As of 2009 there had been no inventory of the fauna.

== Sources ==
- Araújo Corte, Dione Angélica de; Valladares-Pádua, Cláudio Benedito (November 2007), Plano de Manejo da Estação Ecológica Mico-Leão-Preto (PDF) (in Portuguese), Brasília: ICMBio, archived from the original (PDF) on 2016-11-07
- Campos, João Batista (2009b), "II: Análise da região da Estação Ecológica do Caiuá" (PDF), Revisão do Plano de Manejo – Estação Ecológica do Caiuá (in Portuguese), Diamante do Norte, archived from the original (PDF) on 2016-11-15
- Campos, João Batista (2009c), "III: Análise da Estação Ecológica do Caiuá" (PDF), Revisão do Plano de Manejo – Estação Ecológica do Caiuá (in Portuguese), Diamante do Norte, archived from the original (PDF) on 2016-11-15
- ESEC do Caiuá (in Portuguese), ISA: Instituto Socioambiental
