= Euclides da Cunha (disambiguation) =

Euclides de Cunha may refer to:

- Euclides da Cunha (1866–1909), a Brazilian writer, sociologist and engineer
- Euclides da Cunha Paulista, a municipality in the state of São Paulo, Brazil
- Euclides da Cunha, Bahia, a municipality in the state of Bahia, Brazil
