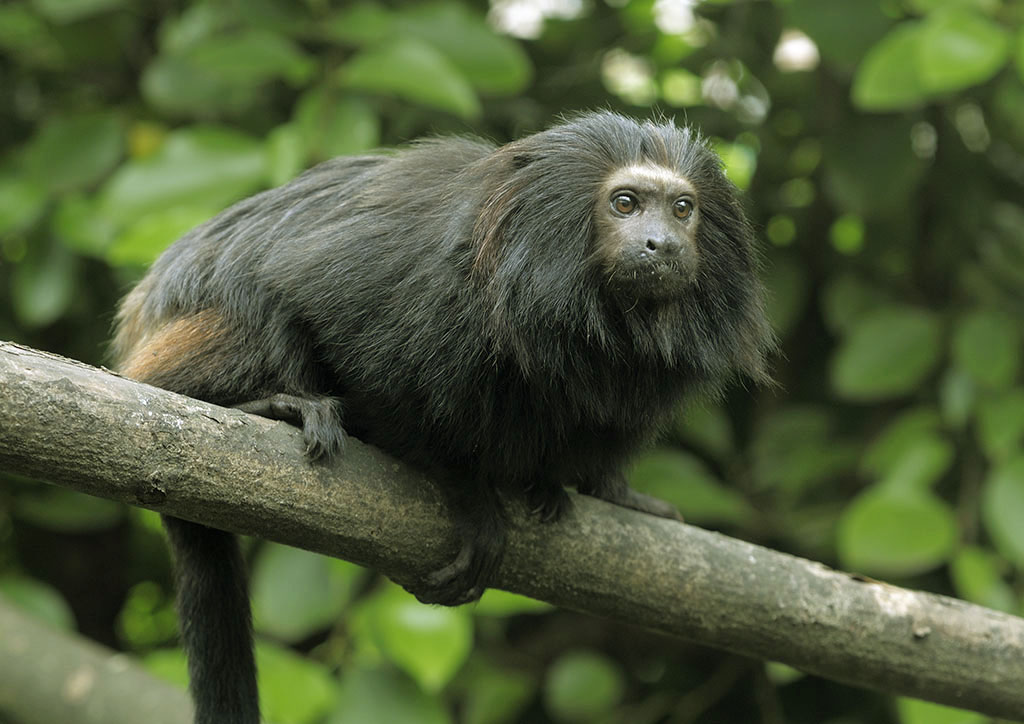
- Black lion tamarin at Bristol Zoo

Conservation status
- Endangered (IUCN 3.1)
- CITES Appendix I

Scientific classification
- Kingdom: Animalia
- Phylum: Chordata
- Class: Mammalia
- Order: Primates
- Family: Callitrichidae
- Genus: Leontopithecus
- Species: L. chrysopygus

Binomial name
- Leontopithecus chrysopygus (Mikan, 1823)

Synonyms
- ater Lesson, 1840

= Black lion tamarin =

Species of New World monkey

The black lion tamarin (Leontopithecus chrysopygus), also known as the golden-rumped lion tamarin, is a lion tamarin endemic to the Brazilian state of São Paulo, almost exclusively at the Morro do Diabo State Park. It was thought to be extinct for 65 years until its rediscovery in 1970. In 2016 an adult couple was found to the east, in the Caetetus Ecological Station, after six years with no sightings.

A 2020 assessment by the International Union for Conservation of Nature (IUCN) estimated that there were 1,600 individuals living in the wild, 1,200 of which are found in Morro do Diabo State Park. They are usually found in groups of 4 to 9, living in the secondary and primary forests along the circumference of its home range.

On average, the black lion tamarin weighs 300–700 grams (11–25 oz).

== Taxonomy ==
The classification of the black lion tamarin was debated, as one group of taxonomists classified the lion tamarins by their geography, while other taxonomists placed them all into one species and then divided them into subspecies. More recently, taxonomists have agreed to base classification predominantly on their geography, though sometimes characteristics such as long calls are used to classify different species, similar to the use of bird songs in taxonomy. For differentiating within Leontopithecus, the black lion tamarin is categorized as starting its call at the lowest note and going through the greatest range of pitch.

== Behaviour and ecology ==
=== Diet ===
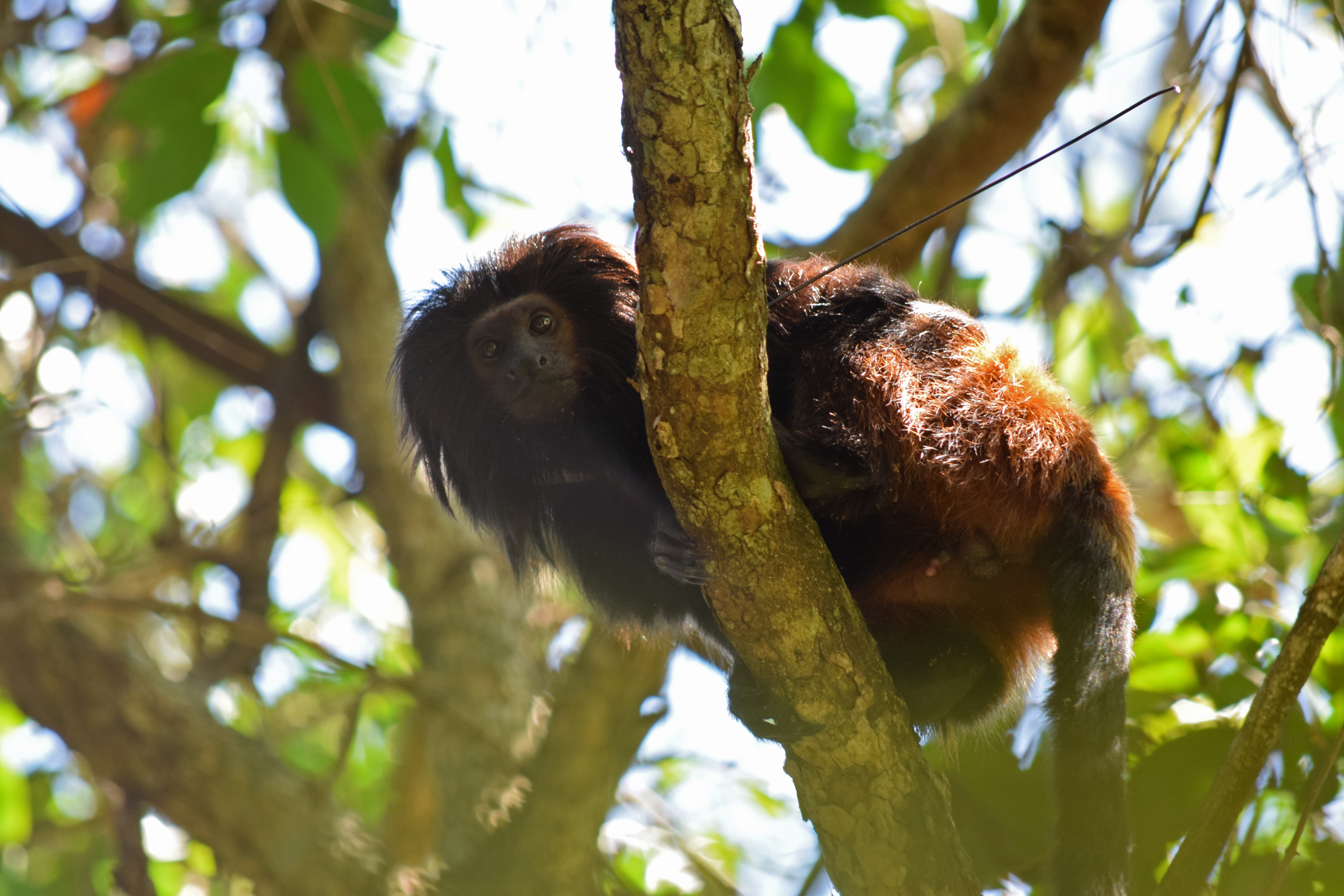
Black lion tamarin in Brazil.

The diet of the black lion tamarin is seasonal and varies with the habitats it moves through. When the tamarin is in the dryland forest, it usually eats a variety of fruits, whereas in a swampy environment it predominantly feeds on the gum of various trees. In addition to seasonal variation, the black lion tamarin exhibits daily and monthly cycles of food preferences.

Independent of the environment it occupies, a tamarin spends long periods each day searching for different types of insects and spiders to feed on. On average, 80% of its time foraging is spent searching for insects, such as by foraging the forest floor. The tamarin's foraging locations are very intentional: it spends extended periods of time looking under dry palm leaves, in loose bark, and in tree cavities, with hands that have specialized fingers for prying. The tamarin also positions itself in trees and scans for insects from above, usually four meters above the forest floor.

The black lion tamarin eats the gum and fruit of trees, climbing up to ten meters to reach them and as these are easily found, the tamarin spends 12.8% of its day obtaining them, rather than the 41.2% of the day spent foraging for insects in the high trees.

=== Reproduction ===
Black lion tamarins mate and have offspring during the spring, summer, and fall months (August to March in Brazil). Females usually have one litter per year, though 20% females produce two litters per year. The mean litter size is two infants.

Most mammals produce a 50:50 ratio of males to females. The black lion tamarin population almost always produce a 60:40 male to female ratio.

Most infants deaths occur within the first two weeks of birth, with newborns of first-time mothers having the lowest survival rates. The number of tamarins that survive to adulthood in the wild is 10% higher than those in captivity.

=== Food sharing ===
During the first few months after birth, the infant is unable to obtain food on its own. For this reason, the infant rides on the parent's back and receives food from the parents. It drinks milk in the 4 to 5 weeks after birth; after that, the parents and other group-members share food with the infant. Sharing involves both offers from the parents and begging by the infant. Usually, until the age of approximately 15 weeks, the infant will receive the majority of its food (especially insects) from others. The number of offers from group-members peaks at week 7; after week 15, sharing slowly declines, stopping by week 26.

=== Communication ===
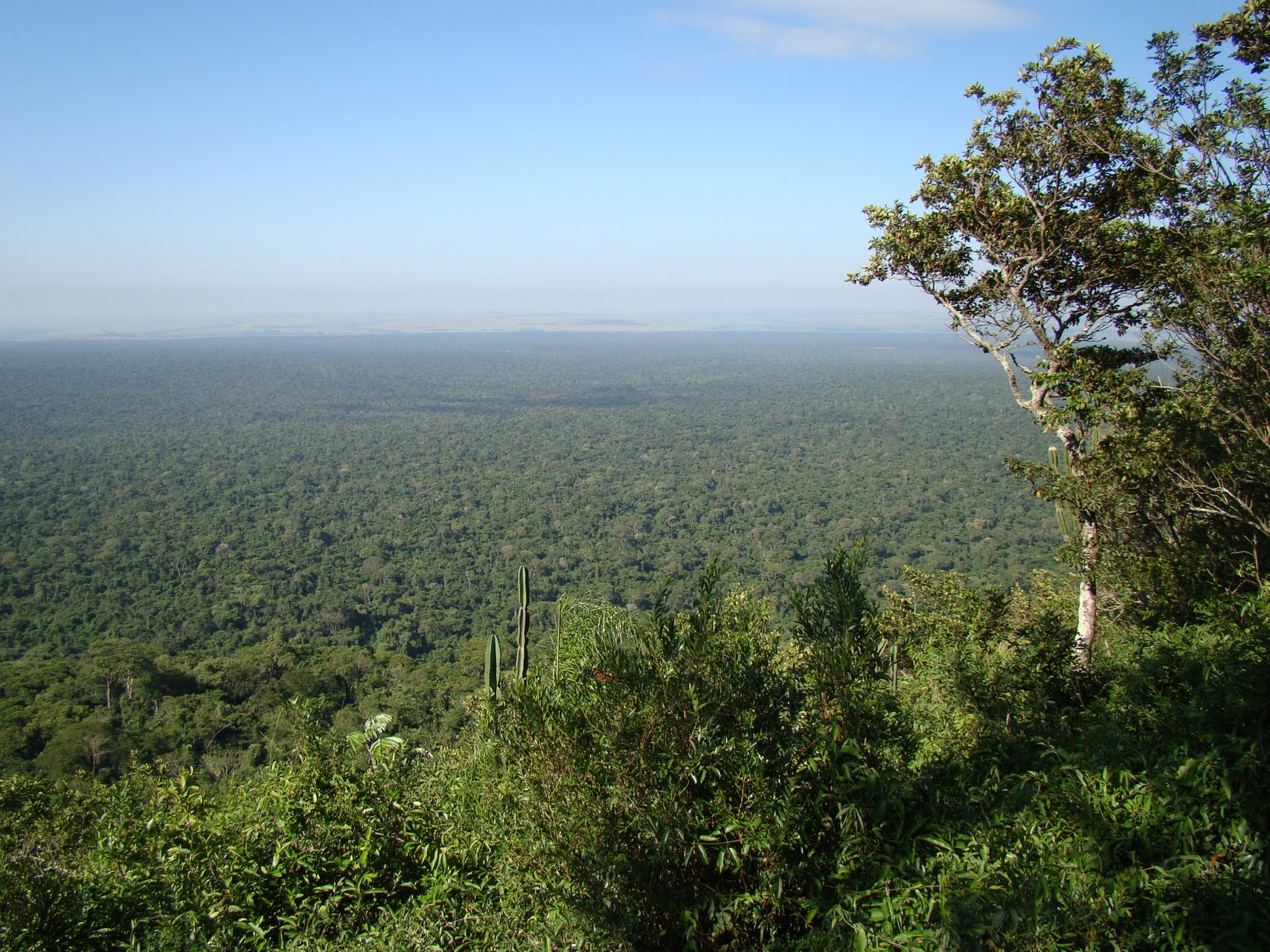
Morro do Diabo State Park is the major conservation unit of the black lion tamarin.

Within Leontopithecus, the black lion tamarin is the largest in size and has the lowest-pitched calls, using longer notes than other species. The black lion tamarin use calls to defend territory, maintain cohesion within the group, attract a mate, and contact individuals who might be lost. Most calls can be recorded in the morning, and can be attributed to the reunion of mated pairs. Mated pairs are mostly monogamous but polyandry has been observed in some populations.

== Conservation ==
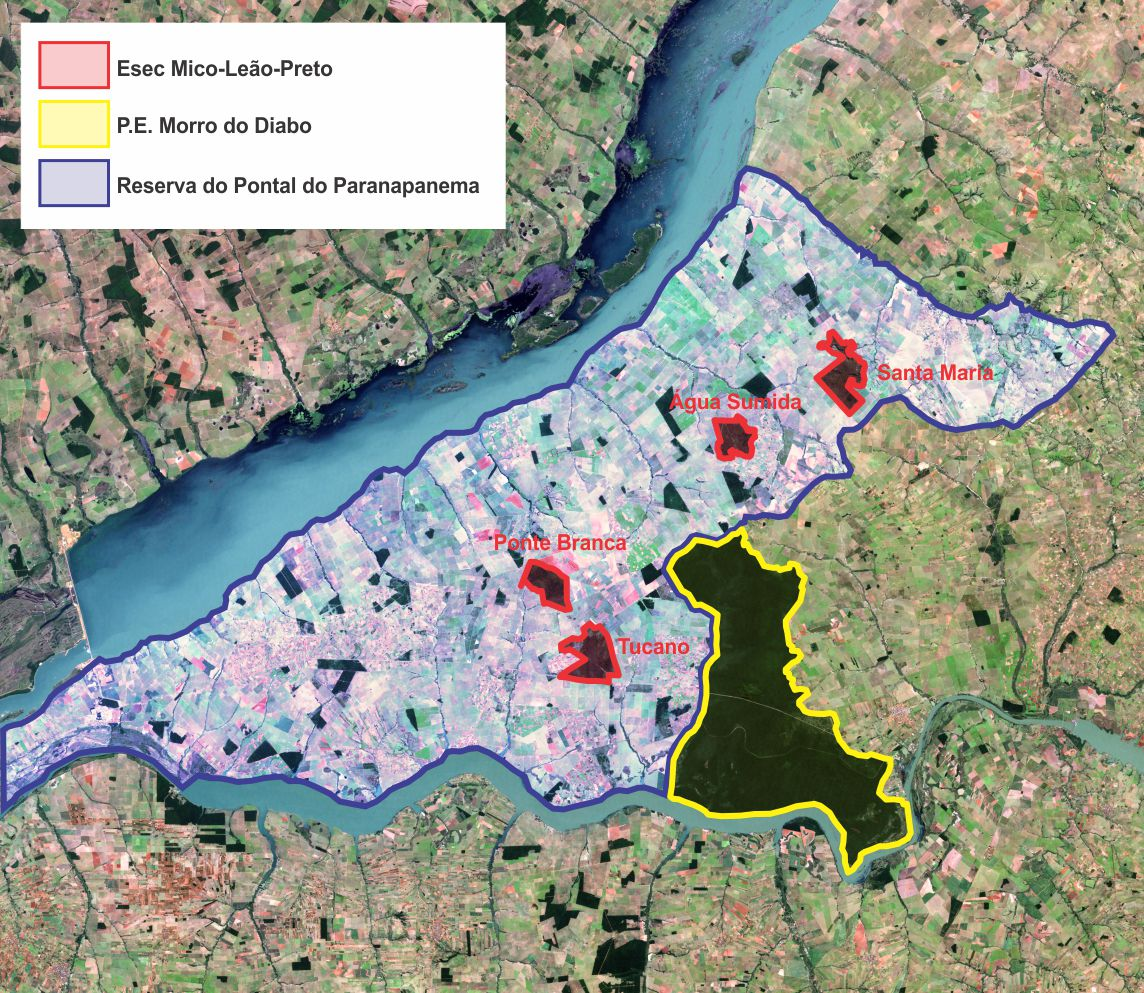
Black lion tamarin conservation units in São Paulo State. Morro do Diabo State Park (yellow line) is the major forest remnant along black lion tamarin distribution. Mico Leão Preto Ecological Station (red line) fragments also hold groups.

The black lion tamarin is rated endangered by the IUCN Red List due to its declining population trend. The main threat against it is the destruction of its habitat through deforestation, though it is also threatened by being hunted in unprotected forests, such as the Fazenda Rio Claro and the Fazenda Tucano (which have roughly 3.66 and 1.0 individuals per square kilometer respectively).

There have been several attempts to bring black lion tamarins into captivity and to salvage what little habitat they have left within the Morro do Diabo State Park, as well as to increase breeding rates. Their population decline in the wild, however, could cause the black lion tamarins to become entirely endemic to the Morro do Diabo.
