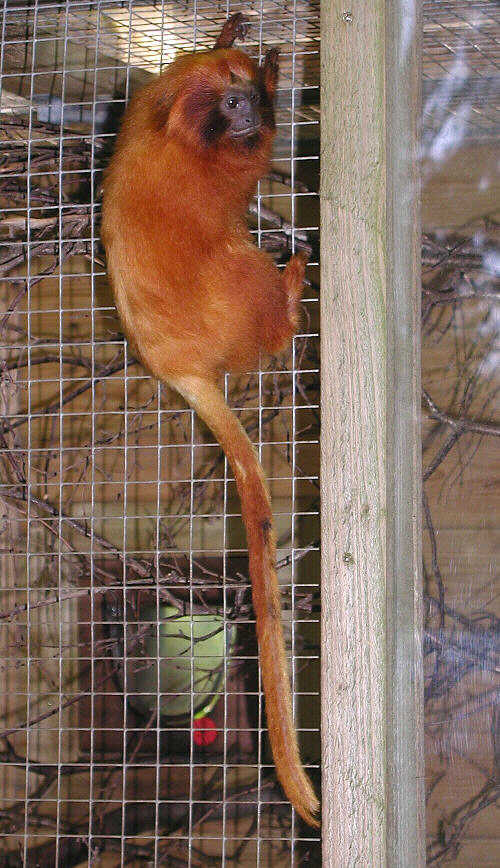
- Golden lion tamarin (Leontopithecus rosalia)

Scientific classification
- Kingdom: Animalia
- Phylum: Chordata
- Class: Mammalia
- Order: Primates
- Family: Callitrichidae
- Genus: Leontopithecus; Lesson, 1840

Type species
- Leontopithecus makikina Lesson, 1840 (= Simia rosalia Linnaeus, 1766)

Species
- Leontopithecus rosalia Leontopithecus chrysomelas Leontopithecus chrysopygus Leontopithecus caissara

Synonyms
- Leontideus Cabrera, 1956; Leontocebus Elliot, 1913

= Lion tamarin =

Lion tamarins

Genus of New World monkeys

The four species of lion tamarins or maned marmosets make up the genus Leontopithecus, from Ancient Greek λέων (léōn), meaning "lion", and πίθηκος (píthēkos), meaning "monkey". They are small New World monkeys named for the mane surrounding their face, similar to the mane of a lion.

== Description ==
Living in the eastern rainforests of Brazil, like all other callitrichids they are arboreal. Lion tamarins weigh up to 900 grams (32 oz) and are about 30 cm (12 in) long, with tails about 45 cm (18 in) long. They jump through trees using their fingers to hold on to branches; they use their claws to dig under the bark to search for insects to eat. They also eat some snakes, small lizards, and small fruits. All are endangered or critically endangered, in part because their habitat has been severely disrupted by human development and climate change.

Lion tamarins tend to live in family groups, with both parents sharing different tasks of rearing the yearly twins born to them. The mother nurses her young every two to three hours, and the father carries the babies on his back.

Diurnal tree-dwellers, they sleep in tree cavities at night. They also seek shelter during the hottest part of the day.

== Species list ==
The different species of lion tamarins are easily discernible from each other, based upon the coloration of their fur:

Genus Leontopithecus – Lesson, 1840 – four species
Common name	Scientific name and subspecies	Range	Size and ecology	IUCN status and estimated population
Golden lion tamarin	Leontopithecus rosalia (Linnaeus, 1766)	southeastern Brazil	Size: golden fur all over, mane sometimes darkening or black Habitat: Diet:	EN
Golden-headed lion tamarin	Leontopithecus chrysomelas (Kuhl, 1820)	Bahia, Brazil	Size: black fur with golden face, arms, and tail Habitat: Diet:	EN
Black lion tamarin or golden-rumped lion tamarin	Leontopithecus chrysopygus (Mikan, 1823)	São Paulo, Brazil	Size: black fur with a dark gold rump Habitat: Diet:	EN
Superagui lion tamarin or black-faced lion tamarin	Leontopithecus caissara Lorini & Persson, 1990	southeastern Brazil	Size: Habitat: golden fur with black face, arms, and tails Diet:	EN

== Conservation ==
Human activity has been affecting the lion tamarins in that cocoa production has taken over their habitat. Mass produced cocoa has been found to thin out surrounding canopy trees in the area. While Leontopithecus species may use shade cocoa forests for travel and feeding, they primarily use mature (i.e. not thinned or otherwise degraded) forests for sleeping

== See also ==
- Tamarin, genus Saguinus
