= Diamante do Norte =

Coordinates: 22.6558°S 52.86°W

- Municipality
- Location in Paraná
- Country: Brazil
- Region: Southern
- State: Paraná
- Mesoregion: Noroeste Paranaense

Population (2020)
  - Total: 5,030
- Time zone: UTC−3 (BRT)

Diamante do Norte is a municipality in the state of Paraná in the Southern Region of Brazil.

The municipality contains the 1,427 hectares (3,530 acres) Caiuá Ecological Station, created in 1994 as compensation for flooding caused by the Rosana Dam on the Paranapanema River.

== See also ==
- List of municipalities in Paraná
