= Mirante do Paranapanema =

- Municipality
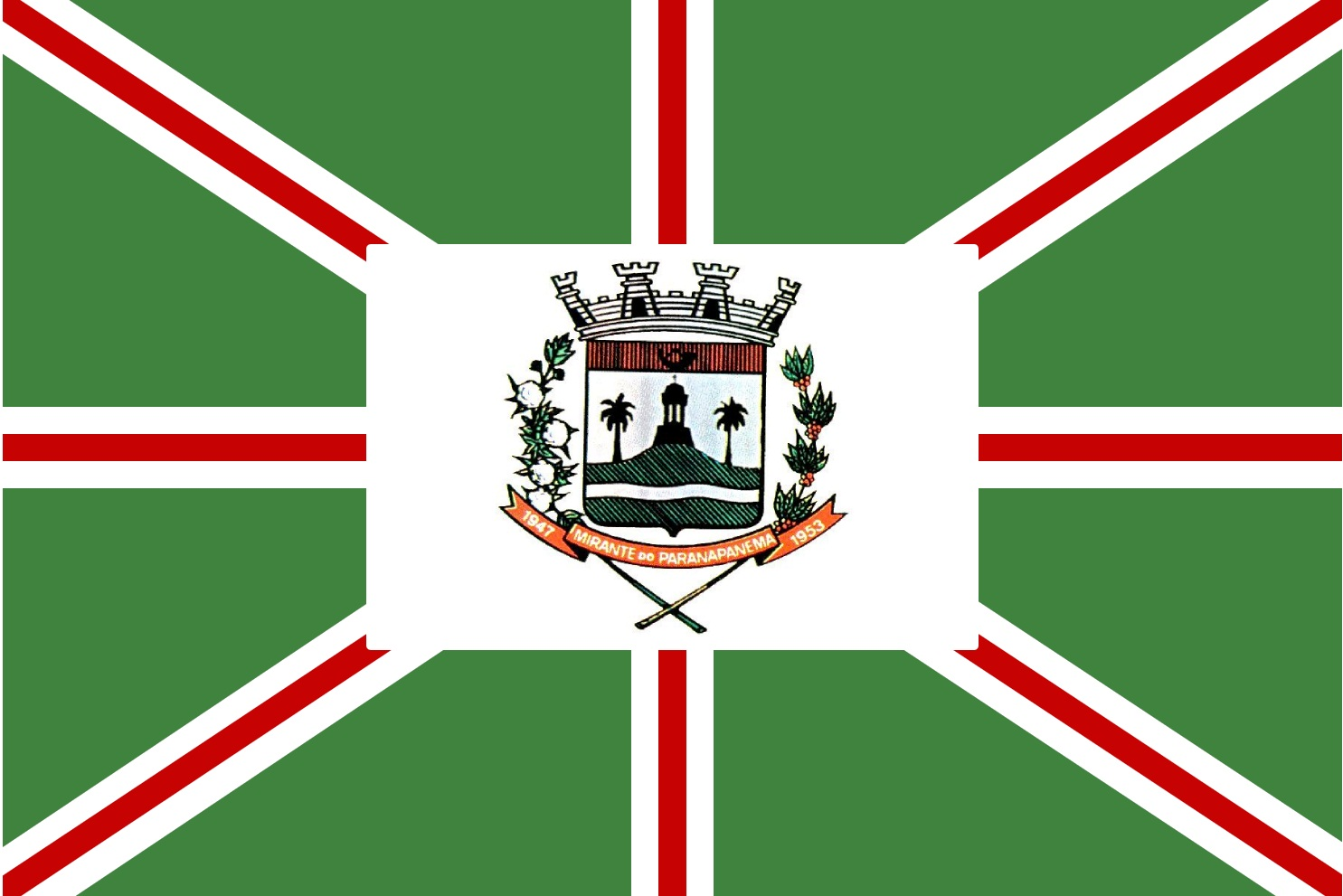
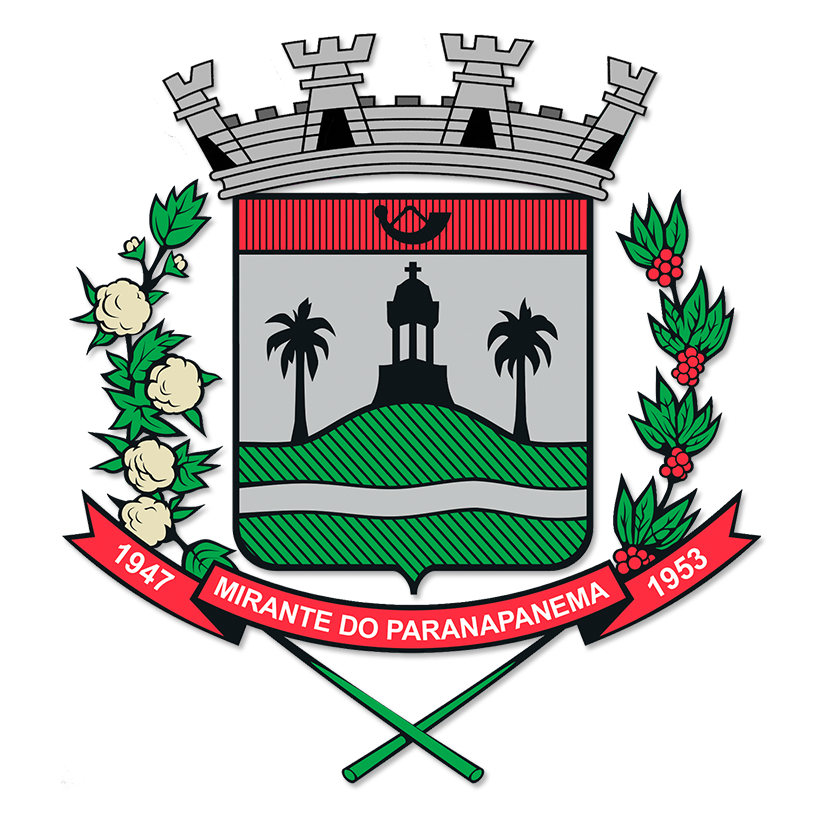
- Flag Coat of arms

- Location in São Paulo state

- Location in Brazil
- Coordinates: 22°17′31″S 51°54′23″W
- Country: Brazil
- Region: Southeast
- State: São Paulo
- Microregion: Presidente Prudente

Area
  - Total: 1,239 km^{2} (478 sq mi)

Population (2020)
  - Total: 18,338
  - Density: 14.80/km^{2} (38.33/sq mi)
- Time zone: UTC−3 (BRT)

Mirante do Paranapanema is a city in the western part of the state of São Paulo, in Brazil. It is part of the microregion of Presidente Prudente. The population is 18,338 (2020 est.) in an area of 1239 km^{2}.

== Geography ==
The altitude is 448 m. It is situated near the Paranapanema River, which forms the border with the state of Paraná here.

The municipality contains part of the 246,800 hectares (610,000 acres) Great Pontal Reserve, created in 1942.

=== Districts ===
The municipality is subdivided into the following districts:

- Mirante do Paranapanema - municipal seat
- Costa Machado
- Cuiabá Paulista

== Media ==
In telecommunications, the city was served by Telecomunicações de São Paulo. In July 1998, this company was acquired by Telefónica, which adopted the Vivo brand in 2012. The company is currently an operator of cell phones, fixed lines, internet (fiber optics/4G) and television (satellite and cable).

== Religion ==
Christianity is present in the city as follows:

=== Catholic Church ===
The Catholic church in the municipality is part of the Roman Catholic Diocese of Presidente Prudente.

=== Protestant Church ===
The most diverse evangelical beliefs are present in the city, mainly Pentecostal, including the Assemblies of God in Brazil (the largest evangelical church in the country), Christian Congregation in Brazil, among others. These denominations are growing more and more throughout Brazil.

== See also ==
- List of municipalities in São Paulo
