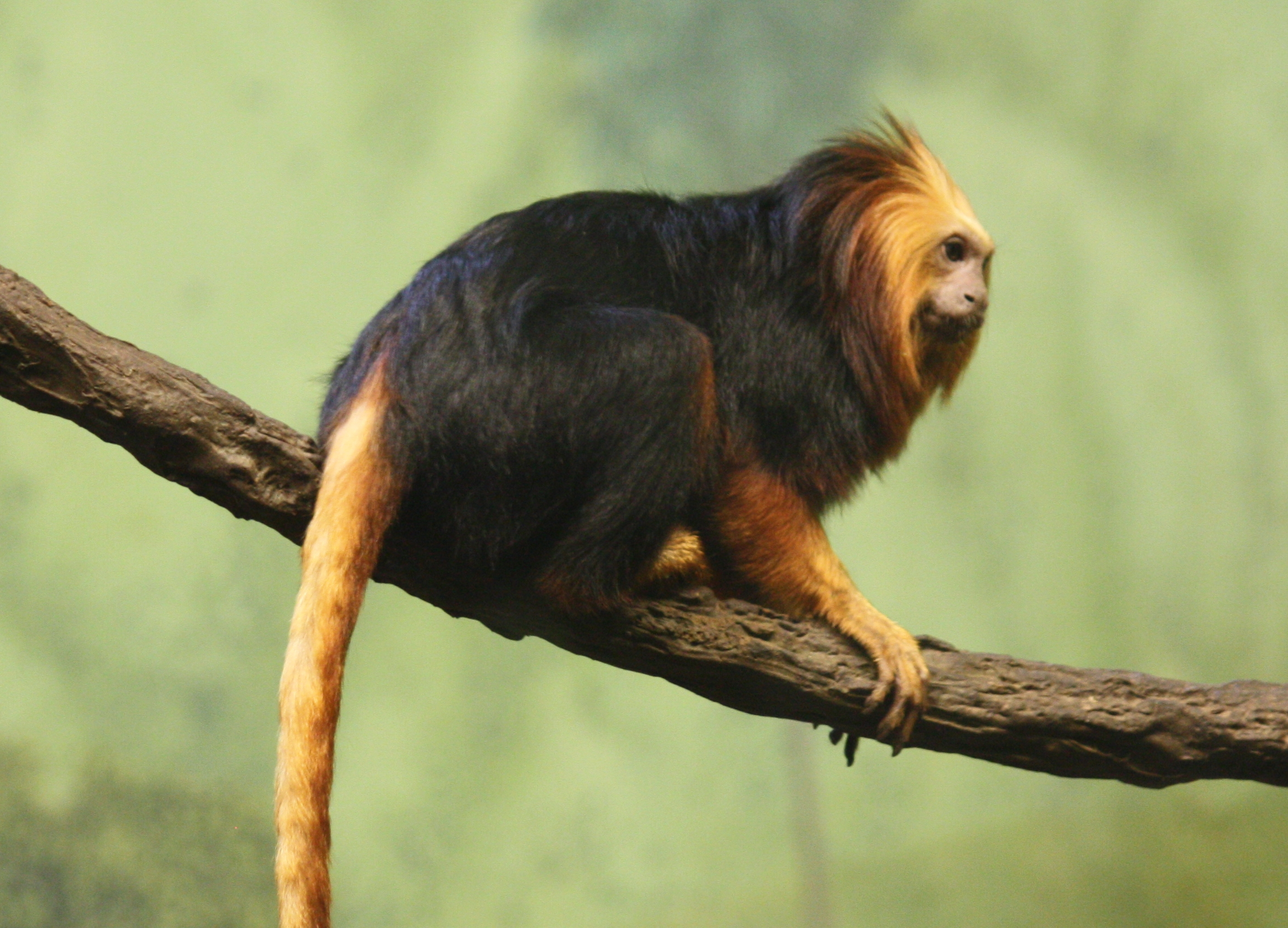
- Male at the Cincinnati Zoo
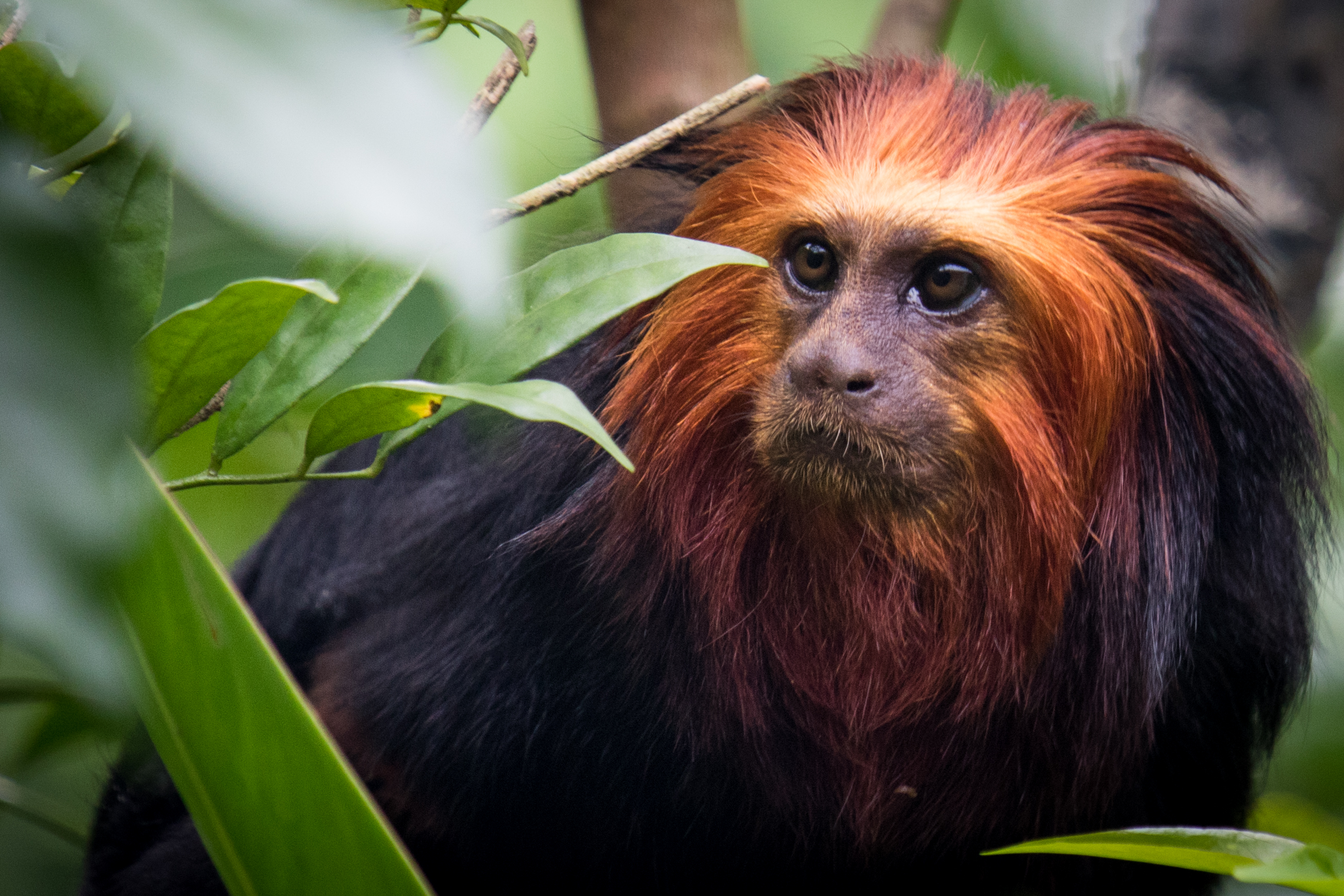
- Female at River Wonders

Conservation status
- Endangered (IUCN 3.1)
- CITES Appendix I

Scientific classification
- Kingdom: Animalia
- Phylum: Chordata
- Class: Mammalia
- Infraclass: Placentalia
- Order: Primates
- Family: Callitrichidae
- Genus: Leontopithecus
- Species: L. chrysomelas

Binomial name
- Leontopithecus chrysomelas (Kuhl, 1820)

Synonyms
- chrysurus I. Geoffroy, 1827

= Golden-headed lion tamarin =

Species of New World monkey

The golden-headed lion tamarin (Leontopithecus chrysomelas), also the golden-headed tamarin, is a lion tamarin endemic to Brazil. It is found only in the lowland and premontane tropical forest fragments in the state of Bahia, and therefore is considered to be an endangered species. It lives at heights of 3–10 metres (9.8–32.8 ft). Its preferred habitat is within mature forest, but with habitat destruction this is not always the case. Several sources seem to have different information on the number of individuals within a group, and the type of social system that may be apparent. The golden-headed lion tamarin lives within group sizes ranging from 2 to 11 individuals, with the average size ranging from 4 to 7. According to various sources, the group may consist of two adult males, one adult female, and any immature individuals, one male and one female and any immature individuals, or there may be one producing pair and a varying number of other group members, usually offspring from previous generations. There is not much known on its mating system, but according to different sources, and information on the possible social groups, it can be assumed that some may practice monogamous mating systems, and some may practice polyandrous mating systems. Both males and females invest energy in caring for the young, and all members of the group also help with juvenile care.

== Diet ==
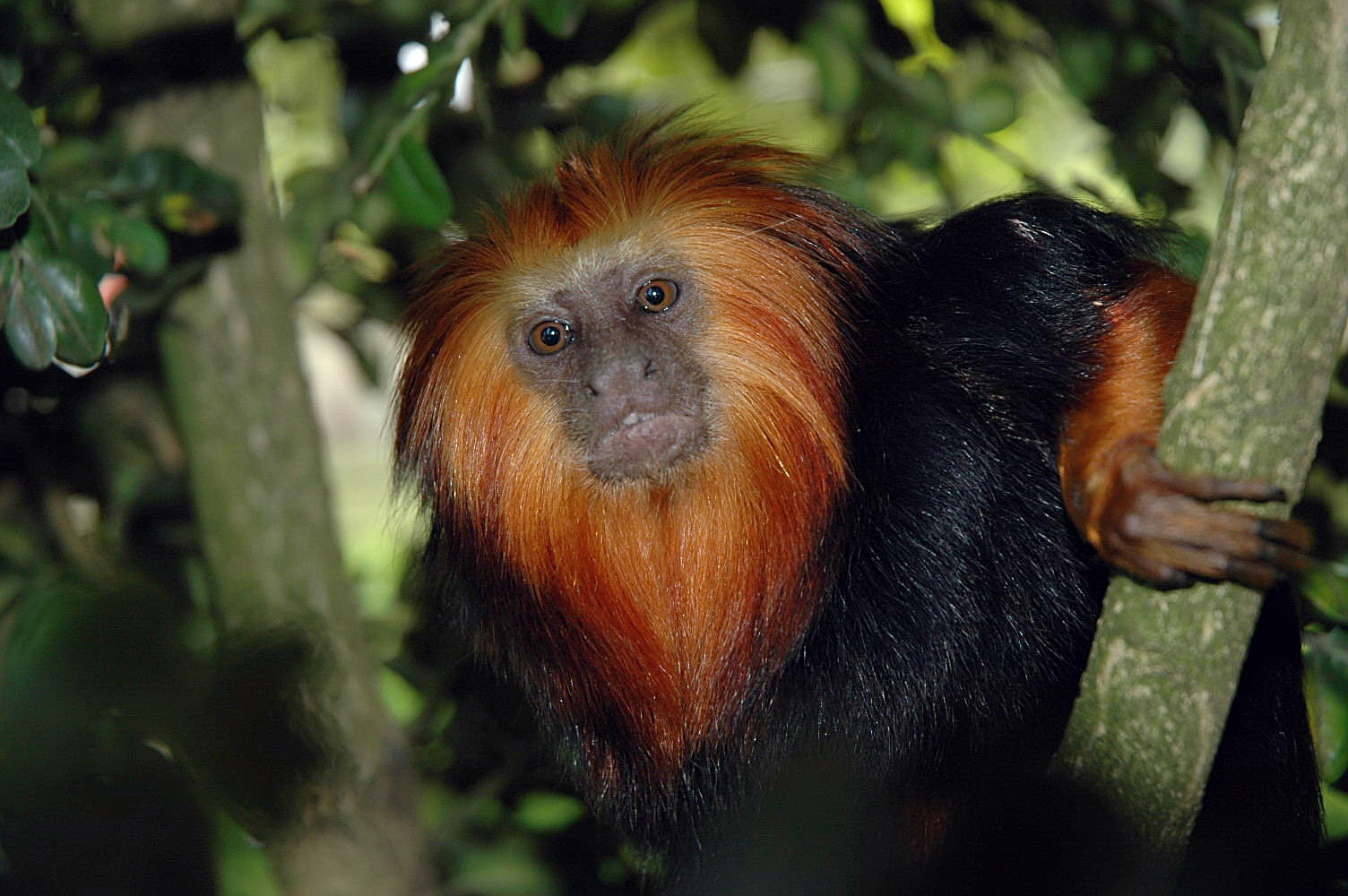
At the Zürich Zoo

Raboy and Dietz, who completed a study at Una Biological Reserve on diet and foraging patterns, observed that the golden-headed lion tamarin tends to defend a large home range relative to its small body size, (ranging from 40–320 hectares). It has a very wide diet; it eats plants, fruits, flowers, nectar, insects and small invertebrates; which include insect larvae, spiders, snails, frogs, lizards, bird eggs and small snakes. Typically, fruits are eaten shortly after awaking, as the fruit sugars provide quick energy for hunting later on. It searches for animal prey within epiphytic bromeliads; if its home range does not contain many bromeliads, then it will also forage in crevices, holes in trees, between palm fronds and in leaf litter. It occasionally eats gum, but this behavior is rare in this species of tamarin. Since its habitat is fairly stable within the rainforest, its preferred food is available year-round and they do not need to resort to the low nutritional value of exudates.

== Behavior ==
The study showed that in the wild the golden-headed lion tamarin spends about 50% of its time in only 11% of its home range. Its ranging patterns appear to be strongly influenced by resource acquisition and much less by territorial defense. The groups showed very few encounters with neighboring groups, but when it did occur, the encounters were always aggressive, and included intensive bouts of long-calling, chases, and fights between the different groups. The golden-headed lion tamarin spends much of its time foraging and traveling within its home range to the next foraging site. Keep in mind that this study was completed at the biggest intact forest available to L. chrysomelas, so its behavior may change depending on the habitat and resources available. At a golden-headed lion tamarin site in Lemos Maia, it was shown that groups had an average home range of only 63 hectares, but they ranged in a patch of forest that was almost entirely discontinuous from the neighboring forests.

== Range ==
Its home range may be large in order to provide a sufficient amount of easily depletable fruit and prey foraging sites over the long term. On average it defended home ranges that are 123 hectares. Space is not necessarily used exclusively, and golden-headed lion tamarin groups may occupy areas that overlap to some extent at their borders

== Conservation ==
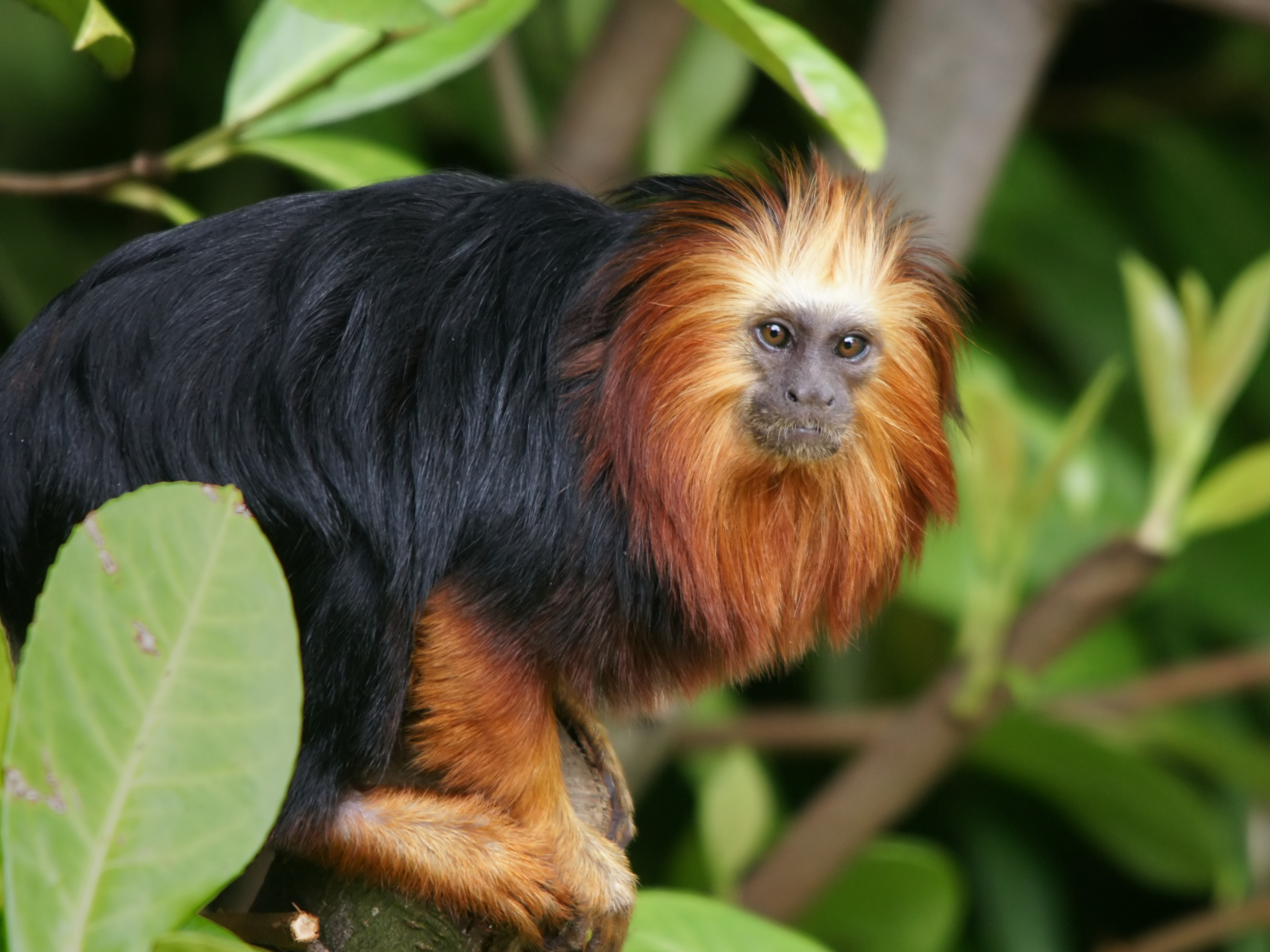
Adult at Chester Zoo

The IUCN Red List categorized the golden-headed lion tamarin as endangered in 1982. According to Costa, Leite, Mendes, and Ditchfield, Brazil accounts for about 14% of the world's biota and has the largest mammal diversity in the world, with more than 530 described species. According to the Brazilian Institute of Environment and Renewable Natural Resources (IBAMA), out of the 24 endemic primates of the Atlantic Forest, 15 of them are threatened. Brazil's Atlantic forest is one of the most endangered ecosystems on earth, in which the majority of the original forest has been cleared for farming, mining, ranching & expanding urban centers. The four species of lion tamarin have been studied and managed extensively, combining research on ecology, captive breeding, reintroduction and translocation, habitat restoration and protection, and environmental education.

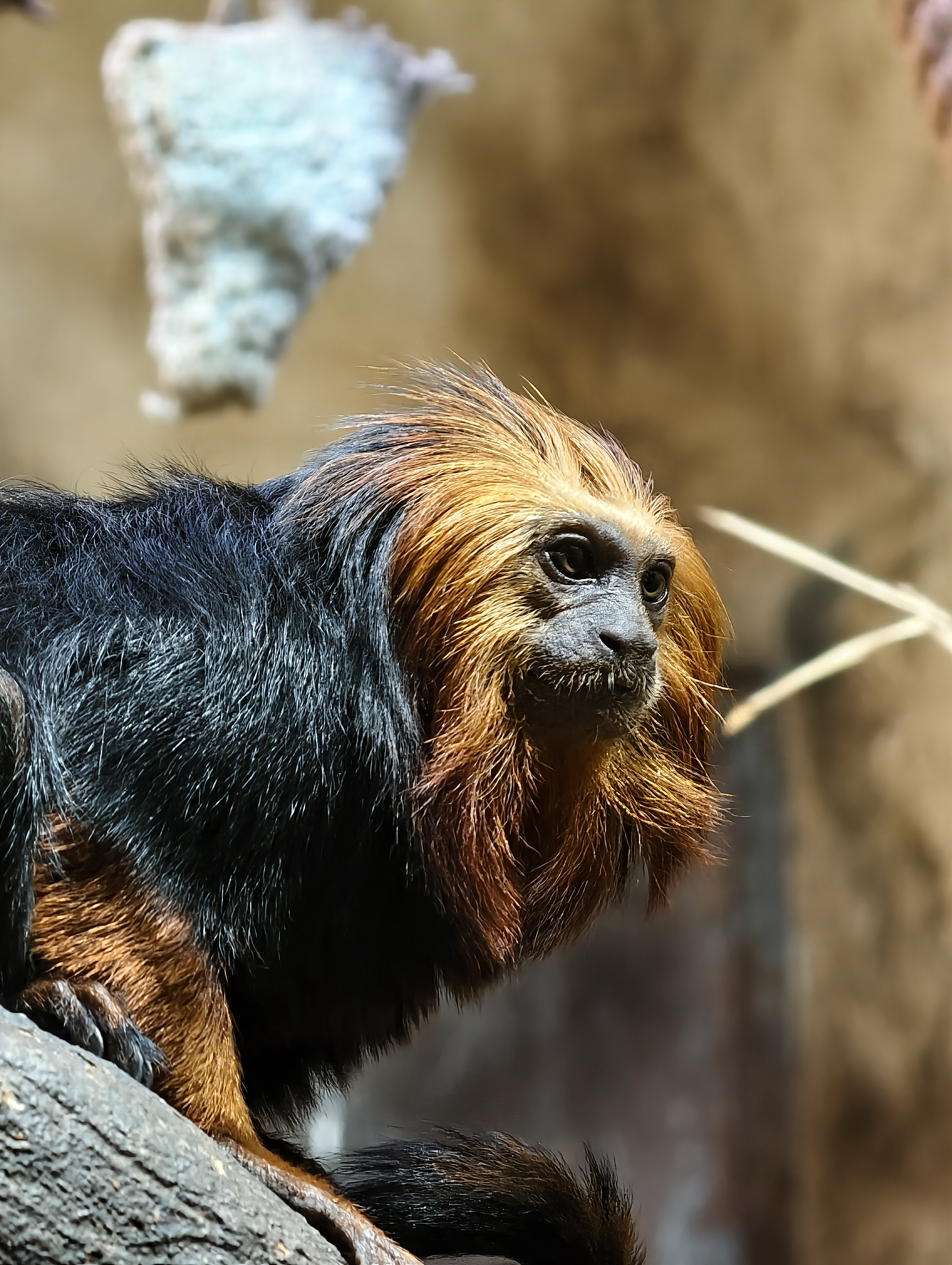
At Orientarium ZOO, Łódź, Poland

=== Threats to survival ===
The forest of Bahia, Brazil has been reduced to 2% due to farming, ranching, mining and urbanization. The Atlantic Forest is highly fragmented, and the disappearance of this habitat is the main reason for the golden-headed lion tamarin's decline. The majority of the forest was once dominated by cocoa plants through a method known as cabruca. This is a system of shade cropping in which the middle and understory trees are removed and replaced with cocoa trees. Although the tamarin's habitat is reduced, it still leaves old growth trees which give the tamarins a place to forage and to sleep. In 1989 farmers abandoned their cocoa plants due to a fungus that attacked their harvest. The old growth which was once available abundantly to the tamarins was destroyed to harvest timber, clear land for cattle or grow other crops. The Atlantic Forest is now a mosaic of primary and secondary forest, and agricultural lands.

=== Conservation efforts ===
In 1980 the Brazilian government created the Una Biological Reserve for the protection of the golden-headed lion tamarin and its habitat. Over the years the park has been growing slowly as the government acquires more land. The population at Una is the largest population in the most intact forest. There is also a captive breeding colony of 25 golden-headed lion tamarins at the Rio de Janeiro Primate Center. Due to a great amount of help, scientist believe that there are around 6000 Golden-headed lion tamarin in the wild.

In the early 1990s, the Landowner's Environmental Protection Plan was created to educate the community about the importance of protecting the forest and the tamarin. The protection plan included conservation activities on over 70% of the neighboring farms, educating farmers on how to use sustainable agriculture in order to preserve the tamarin's habitat. The plan also educates school children, hunters and forest guards on conservation, property rights and land use. This method of educating and involving the community has had great success for preserving the tamarin and their habitat.

Kleiman and Mallinson summarize the conservation efforts that the IBAMA have made in order to help all four of the tamarin species with their population decline. Between 1985 and 1991 IBAMA established four International Recovery and Management Committees (IRMCs). These IRMCs provide IBAMA with official guidance in the recovery efforts and management of the four species, and they are recognized by the government of Brazil as technical advisors.

Public concerns of the tamarin species occurred in the 1960s when Adelmar Coimbra-Filho brought to the attention the rapid declines of the golden lion tamarin due to exportation and habitat destruction. His input helped with the establishment of the biological reserves to protect lion tamarins. He founded the Rio de Janeiro Primate Center and he was the first person to breed the golden-headed lion tamarin. From 1983-1994 large numbers of golden headed lion tamarins were exported to Japan and Belgium as part of the exotic pet trade. IBAMA asked Jeremy Mallinson to form and become chair of an IRMC for the golden-headed lion tamarin. The initial objective of the committee was to have all of the tamarins returned to Brazil, and some of them were returned. The committees promotes lion tamarins as a flagship species with the ultimate intent being the preservation of the unique Atlantic Forest, ecosystem and its many endemic plants and animal.

The IRMC is divided into several tasks which include the captive management and research program, conservation and education program in Bahia, a Landowner's Environmental Education Program, and a field study of ecology and behavior in the Federal Una Biological Reserve. They provide IBAMA with recommendations concerning demographic and genetic management, research proposals for wild and captive populations, community conservation education programs, expansion of protected areas through land acquisition, and they also lobby appropriate agencies to support new legislation. The IRMC members are international in composition with members from diverse disciplines, consisting of conservationists, field biologists, zoo biologists, educators, administrators, and IBAMA staff.
