= Teodoro Sampaio, São Paulo =

Teodoro Sampaio
- Municipality
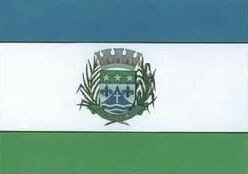
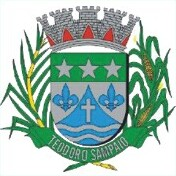
- Flag Coat of arms

- Location in São Paulo state

- Location in Brazil
- Coordinates: 22°31′57″S 52°10′3″W
- Country: Brazil
- Region: Southeast
- State: São Paulo

Area
  - Total: 1,556 km^{2} (601 sq mi)

Population (2020)
  - Total: 23,273
  - Density: 14.96/km^{2} (38.74/sq mi)
- Time zone: UTC−3 (BRT)

Teodoro Sampaio is a municipality in the state of São Paulo in Brazil. The population is 23,273 (2020 est.) in an area of 1,556 km^{2} (601 sq mi). The elevation is 321 m.

== Geography ==
The municipality contains part of the 246,800-hectare (610,000-acre) Great Pontal Reserve, created in 1942. It contains the 33,845-hectare (83,630-acre) Morro do Diabo State Park, created in 1986. It also contains 36% of the 6,677-hectare (16,500-acre) Mico Leão Preto Ecological Station, established in 2002.

=== Districts ===
The municipality is subdivided into the following districts:

- Teodoro Sampaio - municipal seat
- Planalto do Sul

== Demographics ==
Historical population (municipality)
Year	Population	%±
1970	26,114	—
1980	26,329	0.8%
1991	49,236	87.0%
2000	20,003	−59.4%
2010	21,386	6.9%
2022	22,173	3.7%

== Media ==
In telecommunications, the city was served by Telecomunicações de São Paulo. In July 1998, this company was acquired by Telefónica, which adopted the Vivo brand in 2012. The company is currently an operator of cell phones, fixed lines, internet (fiber optics/4G) and television (satellite and cable).

== Religion ==
Christianity is present in the city as follows:

=== Catholic Church ===
The Catholic church in the municipality is part of the Roman Catholic Diocese of Presidente Prudente.

=== Protestant Church ===
The most diverse evangelical beliefs are present in the city, mainly Pentecostal, including the Assemblies of God in Brazil (the largest evangelical church in the country), Christian Congregation in Brazil, among others. These denominations are growing more and more throughout Brazil.

== See also ==
- List of municipalities in São Paulo
