= Eng Sérgio Motta Dam =

Engineer Sérgio Motta (Porto Primavera) Dam
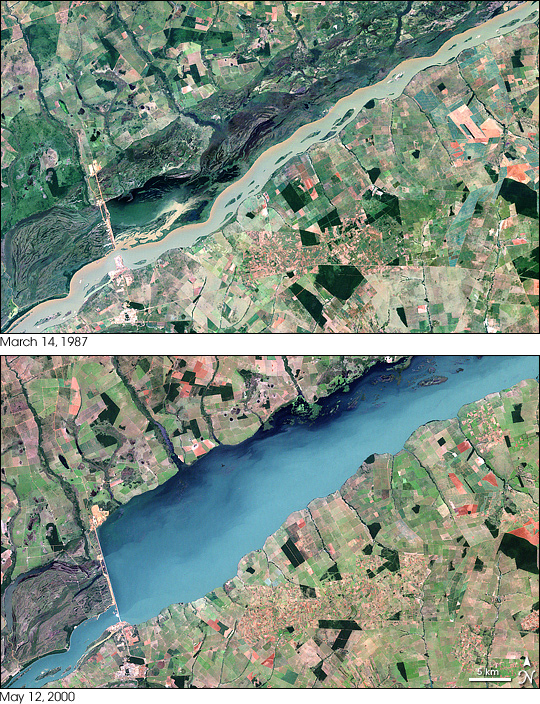
- NASA image of dam before (1987) and after (2000) completion.

- Location within Brazil
- Official name: Sérgio Motta Hydroelectric Power Plant
- Location: Rosana, São Paulo, Brazil
- Coordinates: 22°28′31″S 52°57′30″W
- Construction began: 1980
- Opening date: 1999
- Construction cost: $9 billion USD
- Owner: CESP

Dam and spillways
- Type of dam: Embankment, concrete portion
- Impounds: Paraná River
- Height: 22 m (72 ft)
- Length: 11,380 m (37,340 ft)
- Spillway type: Service, gate-controlled

Reservoir
- Creates: Sérgio Motta Reservoir
- Total capacity: 19.9 km^{3} (16,100,000 acre⋅ft)
- Surface area: 2,250 km^{2} (870 sq mi)

Power Station
- Commission date: 1999–2003
- Type: Conventional
- Turbines: 14 x 110 MW (150,000 hp) Kaplan turbines
- Installed capacity: 1,540 MW (2,070,000 hp)
- Annual generation: 10.5 TWh (38 PJ)

The Engineer Sérgio Motta Dam, formerly known as the Porto Primavera Dam, is an embankment dam on the Paraná River near Rosana in São Paulo, Brazil. It was constructed between 1980 and 1999 for hydroelectric power production, flood control and navigation. An estimated 11 million tropical trees were submerged.

== Technical ==
The dam is named for Sergio Roberto Vieira da Motta, a prominent industrial engineer in São Paulo. At 11.38 kilometres (7.07 mi) in length, it is the longest dam in Brazil.

The 22 metres (72 ft) tall dam creates a reservoir with a 19.9 cubic kilometres (16,100,000 acre⋅ft) capacity and surface area of 2,250 square kilometres (870 sq mi). The dam supports hydroelectric power plant on its southern end with an installed capacity of 1,540 megawatts (2,070,000 hp). The power plant contains 14 x 110 megawatts (150,000 hp) Kaplan turbine generators. Although there are no plans to install them, the power plant has room to accommodate an additional four generators. The dam also supports a 210-metre (690 ft) long and 17-metre (56 ft) wide navigation lock on its southern end with the ability to transport 27 million tons a year.

== History ==
Construction on the dam began in 1980 and the first filling of the reservoir to 253 metres (830 ft) above sea level was complete by 1998. It was inaugurated in 1999 with the first three generators commissioned in March. In 2000, five more generators came online and by 2001, a total of ten were in operation. The second filling to 257 metres (843 ft) above sea level was complete in March 2001 and by October 2003, all 14 generators were in operation.

The dam flooded 13,227 hectares (32,680 acres) of the Lagoa São Paulo Reserve and 3,211 hectares (7,930 acres) of the Great Pontal Reserve. In compensation, the Companhia Energética de São Paulo (CESP) created the 73,345-hectare (181,240-acre) Rio Ivinhema State Park, the 7,720-hectare (19,100-acre) Rio do Peixe State Park, the 9,043-hectare (22,350-acre) Aguapeí State Park and the 6,262-hectare (15,470-acre) Cisalpina Private Natural Heritage Reserve.

In 2005, an infestation of Hydrilla verticillata was discovered in the reservoir, the first time the invasive weed was discovered in Brazil. The dam has also had negative effects on downstream fish reproduction and has a 520-metre (1,710 ft) long fish ladder.

== See also ==
- List of power stations in Brazil
- Fishermen Tales: Memories of drouned lives (UNESP, Master thesis)
- Fishermen's histories: a study with riparians ousted by a hydroelectric power station (Article published in: Revista Psicologia Política)
- Space and Subjectivity: study with riparian people (Article published in: Psicologia & Sociedade, v.23)
- Impacts of the construction of hydroelectric power stations in the life of the riparian population (Article published in: Emancipação, v.9)

== Sources ==
- PES do Rio do Peixe (in Portuguese), ISA: Instituto Socioambiental
- Unidades de Conservação (in Portuguese), CESP: Companhia Energética de São Paulo, archived from the original on 2014-05-02
