= Icaraíma =

Coordinates: 23°23′S 53°41′W

- Municipality
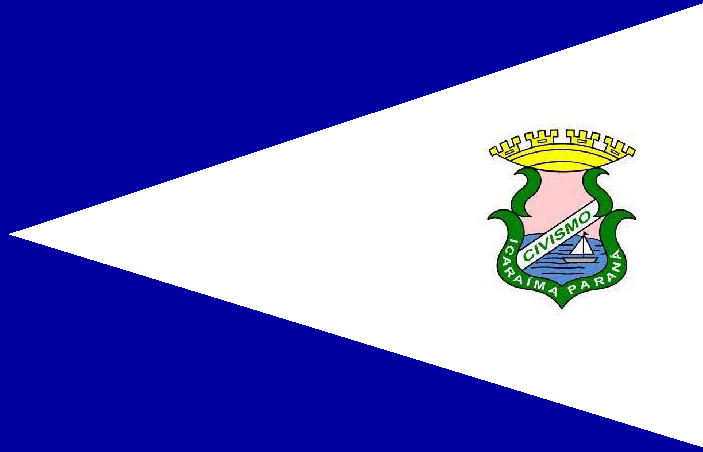
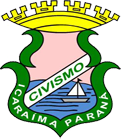
- Flag Coat of arms
- Interactive map of Icaraíma
- Country: Brazil
- Region: Southern
- State: Paraná
- Mesoregion: Noroeste Paranaense

Population (2020)
  - Total: 7,786
- Time zone: UTC−3 (BRT)

Icaraíma is a municipality in the state of Paraná in the Southern Region of Brazil.

== See also ==
- List of municipalities in Paraná
