= Lagoa São Paulo Reserve =

Ecological reserve in Brazil

- Reserva Lagoa São Paulo
- IUCN category V (protected landscape/seascape)
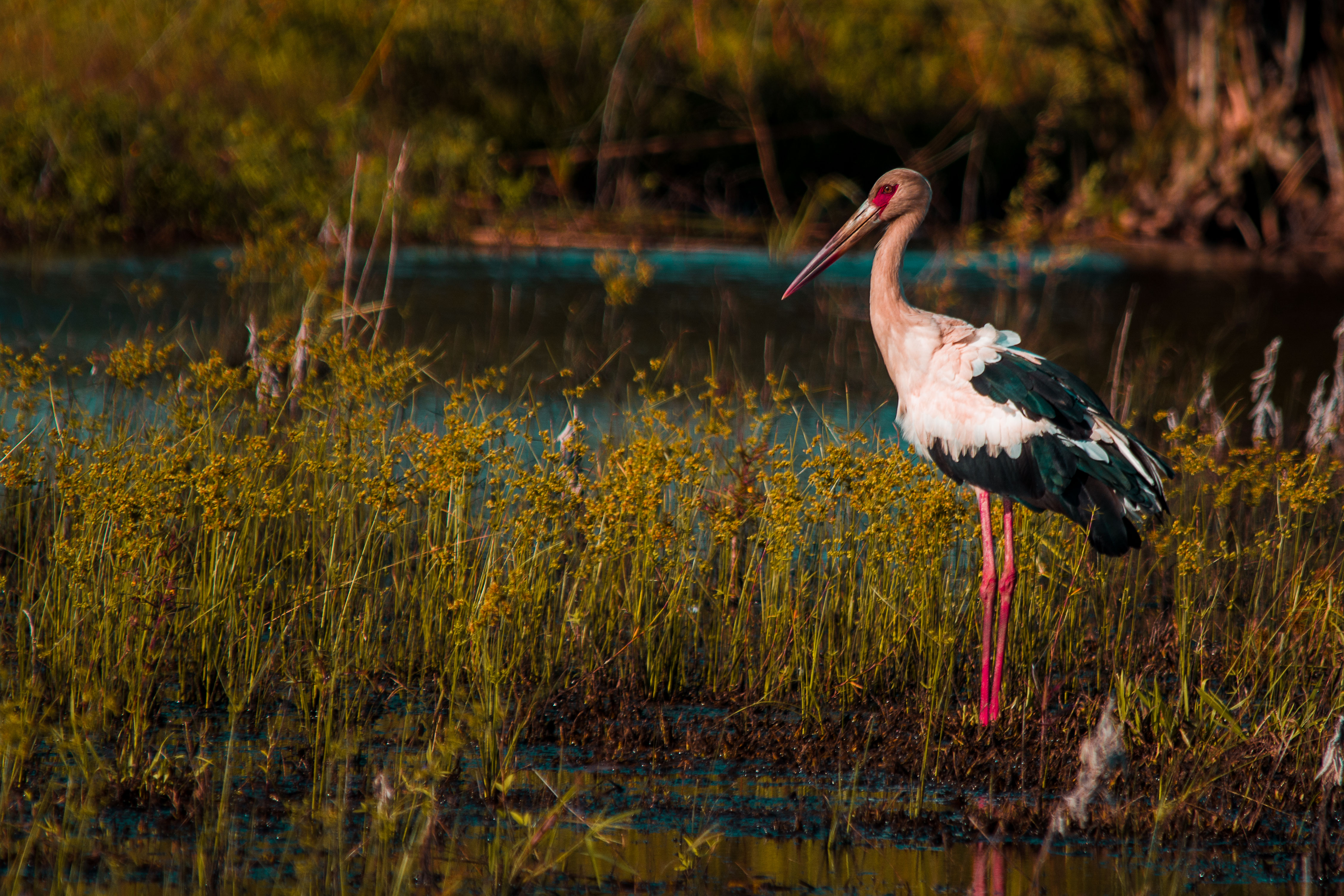
- Bird on a small lake between the Distrito de Campinal and the town of Presidente Epitácio

- Location within Brazil
- Nearest city: Presidente Epitácio, São Paulo
- Coordinates: 21°41′29″S 51°57′24″W
- Area: 936.97 hectares (2,315.3 acres)
- Designation: Ecological reserve
- Created: 29 October 1941

The Lagoa São Paulo Reserve (Portuguese: Reserva Lagoa São Paulo) is an ecological reserve in the state of São Paulo, Brazil. It was created in 1942, but over the years suffered considerable degradation by illegal invasions and squatters. It was largely flooded after construction of the Eng Sérgio Motta Dam on the Paraná River. Only a small part of the original reserve remains, but some efforts are being made to restore it.

== Creation ==
The Lagoa São Paulo Reserve was in the last large area of forest in the interior of the state of São Paulo, in a region known as the Pontal do Paranapanema. The Morro do Diabo Forest Reserve, which later became the Morro do Diabo State Park, was created by law 12.279 of 29 October 1941. The Lagoa São Paulo Reserve was created by decree 13.049 of 6 November 1942, and the Great Pontal Reserve was created by decree 13.075 of 25 November 1942. These three reserves covered 297,340 hectares (734,700 acres) of forest.

The governor of the state, Fernando Costa, created the reserves to protect public land that was being invaded by squatters and subject to many land disputes. The Lagoa São Paulo Reserve had an area of 14,200 hectares (35,000 acres), including seven lagoons, and was home to many species of flora and fauna, some threatened with extinction.

== Degradation ==
Costa's successor, Adhemar de Barros allowed continued destruction of the reserves, supported by the local mayors. Lagoa São Paulo Reserve was the first to be invaded, followed by the Great Pontal Reserve, which was reduced by Adhemar de Barros in 1944 from 246,840 hectares (610,000 acres) to 108,900 hectares (269,000 acres). In the 1950s about 500 families were living inside the Lagoa São Paulo Reserve. Jânio Quadros came to power in 1955 and took a series of measures to protect the Lagoa São Paulo and Great Pontal reserves, which still had much of their forest cover intact. His successors were not interested in conservation, and in his second term Adhemar de Barros repealed the decrees published by Jânio Quadros, apart from one that had created the Morro do Diabo State Park.

== Flooding ==
Damming of the Paraná River began in the 1980s for construction of the Engenheiro Sérgio Motta Hydroelectric Power Plant. The dam was built by the Companhia Energética de São Paulo (CESP). Flooding affected the municipalities of Presidente Epitácio and Caiuá on the left bank of the Paraná River and the Rio do Peixe, the lagoon complex of the Lagoa São Paulo Ecological Reserve and its surroundings. Law 10.018 of 2 July 1998 suppressed 13,227 hectares (32,680 acres) of the Lagoa São Paulo Reserve and 3,211 hectares (7,930 acres) of the Great Pontal Reserve that were being flooded by the reservoir. CESP was responsible for indemnities arising from the flooding.

Protected areas created to compensate for the dam were the 73,345-hectare (181,240-acre) Rio Ivinhema State Park, the 9,043-hectare (22,350-acre) Aguapeí State Park, the 7,720-hectare (19,100-acre) Rio do Peixe State Park and the 6,262-hectare (15,470-acre) Cisalpina Private Natural Heritage Reserve.

== Later history ==
An area of 3,500 hectares (8,600 acres) of the Lagoa São Paulo Reserve escaped flooding. However, as soon as the reservoir had filled the new environment was invaded by hunters, fishermen, cattle ranchers and landless rural laborers. As of 2003 the Lagoa São Paulo Reserve had 936.97 hectares (2,315.3 acres) in the municipality of Presidente Epitácio. Fragments of the original forest and marsh remain, as well as 2,000 year old archaeological remains of the Guarani-Kaiowá people, although much of the area has been badly degraded. 166 species of birds have been identified, some rare and others endangered in São Paulo state. As of 2007 efforts were being made in a private/public partnership project to restore the environment through reforestation. The reserve would be part of the proposed Trinational Biodiversity Corridor, which aims to provide forest connections between conservation units in Brazil, Paraguay and Argentina in the Upper Paraná ecoregion.

== Sources ==
- Araújo Corte, Dione Angélica de; Valladares-Pádua, Cláudio Benedito (November 2007), Plano de Manejo da Estação Ecológica Mico-Leão-Preto (PDF) (in Portuguese), Brasília: ICMBio, archived from the original (PDF) on 7 November 2016
- Covas, Mário (2 July 1998), Lei nº 10.018, de 2 de julho de 1998 (in Portuguese)
- Paula, Marcia Bicudo de; Castro Gomes, Almério de (April 2007), "Culicidae (Diptera) em área sob influência de construção de represa no Estado de São Paulo" (PDF), Revista de Saúde Pública, 41 (2), São Paulo: 284–289, doi:10.1590/S0034-89102006005000018, ISSN 0034-8910
- PES do Rio do Peixe (in Portuguese), ISA: Instituto Socioambiental
- Pontal do Paranapanema (in Portuguese), IBAMA: Instituto Brasileiro do Meio Ambiente e dos Recursos Naturais Renováveis
- Rebouças, Lidia Marcelino (2000), O planejado e o vivido: o reassentamento de familias ribeirinhas no Pontal do Paranapanema, Annablume, ISBN 978-85-7419-152-2
- Santos, Ricardo dos; Leal, Antonio Cezar (2009), Análise ambiental da estância turística de Presidente Epitácio – São Paulo – Brasil (PDF)
- Silva, Odair Vieira da; Santos, Silvia Gomes dos (June 2009), "Retrospectiva Histórica da Instituição do Parque Estadual do Morro do Diabo – Município de Teodoro Sampaio – Sprajetória Histórica da Aviação Mundial" (PDF), Revista Científica Eletônica de Turismo (in Portuguese), VI (11), ISSN 1806-9169
- Unidades de Conservação (in Portuguese), CSEP: Companhia Energética de São Paulo, archived from the original on 2 May 2014
- Weffort, Djalma (13 June 2007), Porque proteger a reserva florestal da Lagoa São Paulo (in Portuguese), Apoena, archived from the original on 14 November 2016
