= Great Pontal Reserve =

Ecological reserve in São Paulo, Brazil

- Reserva Estadual Pontal do Paranapanema
- IUCN category V (protected landscape/seascape)
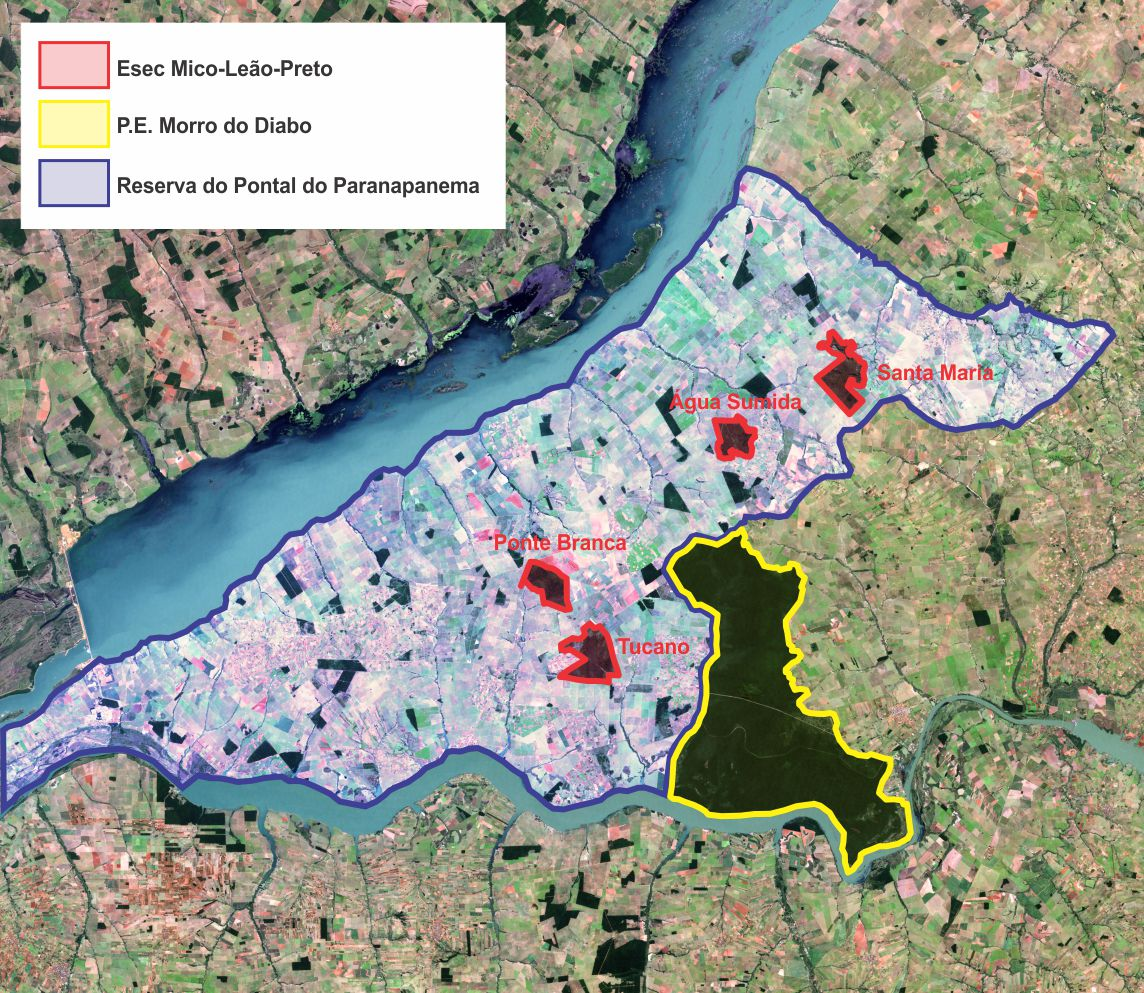
- Eng Sérgio Motta Dam reservoir to the north. Light blue: Great Pontal Reserve, mostly deforested. Small black areas in red: Mico Leão Preto ESEC. Large black area in yellow: Morro do Diabo PES

- Location within Brazil
- Nearest city: Presidente Epitácio, São Paulo
- Coordinates: 22.215623°S 52.287297°W
- Area: 246,840 hectares (610,000 acres)
- Designation: Ecological reserve
- Created: 25 November 1942

The Great Pontal Reserve (Portuguese: Grande Reserva do Pontal), formally called the Pontal do Paranapanema State Reserve (Portuguese: Reserva Estadual Pontal do Paranapanema), is an ecological reserve is the state of São Paulo, Brazil. It was created in 1942, but over the years suffered considerable degradation by illegal invasions and squatters. It was partly flooded after construction of the Eng Sérgio Motta Dam on the Paraná River. The reserve today is a poor agricultural region mostly used for cattle and sugar cane farming.

== Creation ==
The Pontal do Paranapanema occupies the extreme west of the state of São Paulo. It is bounded to the north and west by the Paraná River and to the south by the Paranapanema River. To the east it was bounded by the advancing agricultural frontier. European occupation of the Pontal do Paranapanema region began in earnest when the Sorocabana Railway reached the Paraná River in 1917. Urban centers were built along the railway and intensive logging began, followed by farming of coffee, cotton, peanuts and cattle.

The governor of São Paulo state in the early 1940s, Fernando Costa, created three reserves to protect public land in the region. The Morro do Diabo Forest Reserve, which later became the Morro do Diabo State Park, was created on 29 October 1941. The Lagoa São Paulo Reserve was created on 6 November 1942, and the Great Pontal Reserve was created by decree 13.075 of 25 November 1942. These three reserves covered 297,340 hectares (734,700 acres) of forest.

== Degradation ==
Over the years that followed the Lagoa São Paulo and Great Pontal reserves continued to be invaded by squatters and deforested, often with government support. Costa's successor, Adhemar de Barros allowed this process, supported by the local mayors. Lagoa São Paulo Reserve was the first to be invaded, followed by the Great Pontal Reserve, which was reduced by Adhemar de Barros in 1944 from 246,840 hectares (610,000 acres) to 108,900 hectares (269,000 acres). Between 1945 and 1965 most of the Great Pontal Reserve was deforested to make way for large cattle farms or for small farms of 5–15 alqueires (Note: An alqueire paulista is equal to 2.42 hectares (6.0 acres). Farm sizes would thus be about 12 to 36 hectares (30 to 89 acres).) around urban locations.

Jânio Quadros came to power in 1955 and took a series of measures to protect the Lagoa São Paulo and Great Pontal reserves, which still had much of their forest cover intact. His successors were not interested in conservation, and in his second term Adhemar de Barros repealed the decrees published by Jânio Quadros, apart from one that had created the Morro do Diabo State Park. In 1975 the state launched construction of hydroelectric power plants on the Paranapanema and Paraná Rivers. Employees on these projects squatted on land in the reserves after they were dismissed.

== Flooding ==
Damming of the Paraná River began in the 1980s for construction of the Engenheiro Sérgio Motta Hydroelectric Power Plant. The dam was built by the Companhia Energética de São Paulo (CESP). Law 10.018 of 2 July 1998 suppressed 13,227 hectares (32,680 acres) of the Lagoa São Paulo Reserve and 3,211 hectares (7,930 acres) of the Great Pontal Reserve that were being flooded by the reservoir. CESP was responsible for indemnities arising from the flooding.

== Later history ==
By 1997 the reserve was a legal fiction that existed only on paper. The government proposed to end the land disputes by an arrangement under which squatters would return a portion of their land to the state in return for a clear title to the remainder. Three NGOs proposed modifications to the plan, which were partially accepted, to ensure that as far as possible the state would receive forested land. The forests would be used to create new conservation units linked through corridors to the Morro do Diabo State Park, and surrounded by agroforestry buffer zones. The Mico Leão Preto Ecological Station was created by federal decree on 16 July 2002. It consists of four separate fragments of Atlantic Forest within the Pontal do Paranapanema.

As of 2003 the Great Pontal Reserve still officially covered 246,840 hectares (610,000 acres) in the municipalities of Euclides da Cunha Paulista, Marabá Paulista, Mirante do Paranapanema, Presidente Epitácio, Rosana and Teodoro Sampaio. Low fertility of the soil and distance from natural markets has meant that only cattle and sugarcane are profitable, and the region is the poorest in the state of São Paulo. In 2016 the Institute of Ecological Research (IPE) was undertaking various projects in the Pontal, including bee farming, planting bushes for sale, tree nurseries, coffee farming, studies of large mammals in the forest remnants and the Atlantic Forest Corridors project.

== Sources ==
- Araújo Corte, Dione Angélica de; Valladares-Pádua, Cláudio Benedito (November 2007), Plano de Manejo da Estação Ecológica Mico-Leão-Preto (PDF) (in Portuguese), Brasília: ICMBio, archived from the original (PDF) on 2016-11-07
- Covas, Mário (2 July 1998), Lei nº 10.018, de 2 de julho de 1998 (in Portuguese)
- ESEC Mico Leão Preto (in Portuguese), ISA: Instituto Socioambiental
- Passos, Messias Modesto dos (2004), "A paisagem do Pontal do Paranapanema - uma apreensão geofotográfica", Acta Scientiarum. Human and Social Sciences (in Portuguese), 26 (1), Maringá, doi:10.4025/actascihumansoc.v26i1.1573
- Paula, Marcia Bicudo de; Castro Gomes, Almério de (April 2007), "Culicidae (Diptera) em área sob influência de construção de represa no Estado de São Paulo" (PDF), Revista de Saúde Pública, 41 (2), São Paulo: 284–289, doi:10.1590/S0034-89102006005000018, ISSN 0034-8910
- PES do Rio do Peixe (in Portuguese), ISA: Instituto Socioambiental
- Pontal do Paranapanema (in Portuguese), IBAMA: Instituto Brasileiro do Meio Ambiente e dos Recursos Naturais Renováveis
- Pontal do Paranapanema (in Portuguese), IPE
- Silva, Odair Vieira da; Santos, Silvia Gomes dos (June 2009), "Retrospectiva Histórica da Instituição do Parque Estadual do Morro do Diabo – Município de Teodoro Sampaio – Sprajetória Histórica da Aviação Mundial" (PDF), Revista Científica Eletônica de Turismo (in Portuguese), VI (11), ISSN 1806-9169
- Valladares-Pádua, Cláudio, "Reforma agrária e a grande reserva do pontal", Reportagem Parabolicas (in Portuguese), Instituto de Pesquisas Ecológicas-IPÊ
