= Rosana, São Paulo =

Rosana
- Municipality
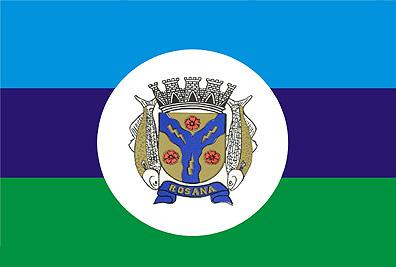
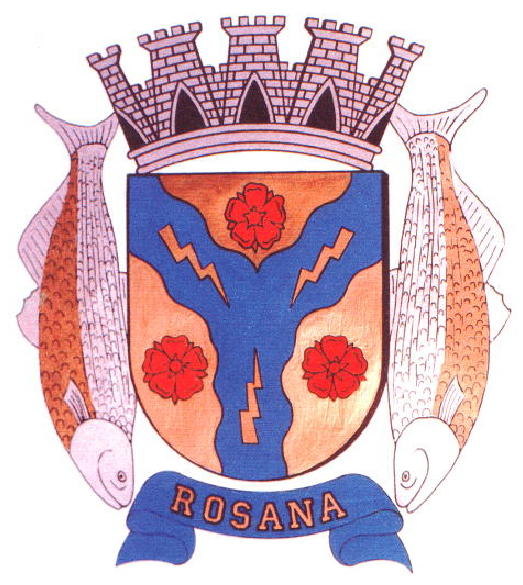
- Flag Coat of arms

- Location in São Paulo state

- Location in Brazil
- Coordinates: 22°34′47″S 53°03′33″W
- Country: Brazil
- Region: Southeast
- State: São Paulo

Area
  - Total: 744 km^{2} (287 sq mi)
- Elevation: 236 m (774 ft)

Population (2020)
  - Total: 16,281
  - Density: 21.9/km^{2} (56.7/sq mi)
- Time zone: UTC-03:00 (BRT)
  - Summer (DST): UTC-02:00 (BRST)
- Website: www.rosana.sp.gov.br

Rosana is a municipality in the state of São Paulo in Brazil. The population is 16,281 (2020 est.) in an area of 744 km^{2} (287 sq mi). The elevation is 236 m. The municipality is the westernmost municipality in the state of São Paulo.

== Geography ==
The municipality contains part of the 246,800-hectare (610,000-acre) Great Pontal Reserve, created in 1942.

== Demographics ==
Historical population (municipality)
Year	Population	%±
2000	24,229	—
2010	19,691	−18.7%
2022	17,440	−11.4%

== Media ==
In telecommunications, the city was served by Telecomunicações de São Paulo. In July 1998, this company was acquired by Telefónica, which adopted the Vivo brand in 2012. The company is currently an operator of cell phones, fixed lines, internet (fiber optics/4G) and television (satellite and cable).

== Religion ==
Christianity is present in the city as follows:

=== Catholic Church ===
The Catholic church in the municipality is part of the Roman Catholic Diocese of Presidente Prudente.

=== Protestant Church ===
The most diverse evangelical beliefs are present in the city, mainly Pentecostal, including the Assemblies of God in Brazil (the largest evangelical church in the country), Christian Congregation in Brazil, among others. These denominations are growing more and more throughout Brazil.

== See also ==
- List of municipalities in São Paulo
