= Euclides da Cunha Paulista =

Municipality in the state of São Paulo in Brazil

- Municipality
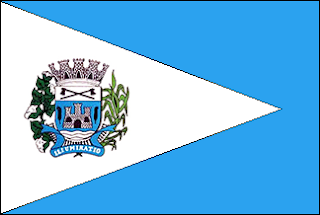
- Flag

- Location in São Paulo state

- Location in Brazil
- Coordinates: 22°33′41″S 52°35′25″W
- Country: Brazil
- Region: Southeast
- State: São Paulo

Area
  - Total: 574 km^{2} (222 sq mi)

Population (2020)
  - Total: 9,325
  - Density: 16.2/km^{2} (42.1/sq mi)
- Time zone: UTC−3 (BRT)

Euclides da Cunha Paulista is a municipality in the state of São Paulo in Brazil. It is named after Euclides da Cunha, a Brazilian writer. The population is 9,325 (2020 est.) in an area of 574 km^{2} (222 sq mi). The elevation is 265 m.

== Geography ==
The municipality contains 30% of the 6,677 hectares (16,500 acres) Mico Leão Preto Ecological Station, established in 2002. It also contains part of the 246,800 hectares (610,000 acres) Great Pontal Reserve, created in 1942.

== Media ==
In telecommunications, the city was served by Telecomunicações de São Paulo. In July 1998, this company was acquired by Telefónica, which adopted the Vivo brand in 2012. The company is currently an operator of cell phones, fixed lines, internet (fiber optics/4G) and television (satellite and cable).

== Religion ==
Christianity is present in the city as follows:

=== Catholic Church ===
The Catholic church in the municipality is part of the Roman Catholic Diocese of Presidente Prudente.

=== Protestant Church ===
The most diverse evangelical beliefs are present in the city, mainly Pentecostal, including the Assemblies of God in Brazil (the largest evangelical church in the country), Christian Congregation in Brazil, among others. These denominations are growing more and more throughout Brazil.

== See also ==
- List of municipalities in São Paulo
