= Rio Ivinhema State Park =

State park in Mato Grosso do Sul, Brazil

- Parque Estadual das Várzeas do Rio Ivinhema
- IUCN category II (national park)
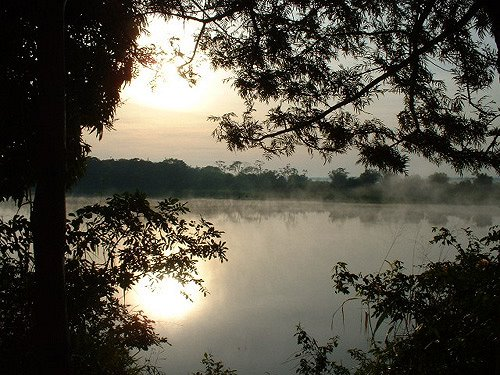
- Rio Ivinhema

- Location within Brazil
- Nearest city: Jateí, Mato Grosso do Sul
- Coordinates: 22°57′33″S 53°40′06″W
- Area: 73,345 hectares (181,240 acres)
- Designation: State park
- Created: 17 December 1998
- Administrator: Secretaria de Meio Ambiente do Estado do Mato Grosso do Sul

The Rio Ivinhema State Park (Portuguese: Parque Estadual das Várzeas do Rio Ivinhema) is a State park in the state of Mato Grosso do Sul, Brazil.

== Location ==
The Rio Ivinhema State Park is divided between the municipalities of Jateí (57.46%), Naviraí (21.36%) and Taquarussu (21.18%) in Mato Grosso do Sul. It has an area of 73,345 hectares (181,240 acres). It is the largest park created by the CESP (Companhia Energética de São Paulo) for environmental compensation. The várzea and associated ecosystems of the Ivinhema River in the Paraná River basin is the last free and representative stretch of this type of environment. The park also holds fragments of seasonal semi-deciduous Atlantic Forest.

The park would be part of the proposed Trinational Biodiversity Corridor, which aims to provide forest connections between conservation units in Brazil, Paraguay and Argentina in the Upper Paraná ecoregion.

== History ==
The Rio Ivinhema State Park was created by state decree 9.278 of 17 December 1998 with the objective of preserving biological diversity, protection the natural heritage and culture of the region with its flora, fauna, landscapes and other natural resources, for the purposes of scientific research, recreation and environmental education in contact with nature. It was created as partial compensation for the land flooded by the Companhia Energética de São Paulo (CESP) with the Engenheiro Sérgio Motta Hydroelectric Power Plant on the Paraná River, which would flood 13,227 hectares (32,680 acres) of the Lagoa São Paulo Reserve and 3,211 hectares (7,930 acres) of the Great Pontal Reserve. (Note: Other protected areas created to compensate for the dam were the 7,720 hectares (19,100 acres) Rio do Peixe State Park, the 9,043 hectares (22,350 acres) Aguapeí State Park and the 6,262 hectares (15,470 acres) Cisalpina Private Natural Heritage Reserve.) The consultative council was appointed on 4 June 2002.

== Sources ==
- Araújo Corte, Dione Angélica de; Valladares-Pádua, Cláudio Benedito (November 2007), Plano de Manejo da Estação Ecológica Mico-Leão-Preto (PDF) (in Portuguese), Brasília: ICMBio, archived from the original (PDF) on 2016-11-07
- PES do Rio Ivinhema (in Portuguese), ISA: Instituto Socioambiental
- PES do Rio do Peixe (in Portuguese), ISA: Instituto Socioambiental
- Unidades de Conservação (in Portuguese), CSEP: Companhia Energética de São Paulo, archived from the original on 2014-05-02
