= Spotted bolo mouse =

Conservation status
- Data Deficient (IUCN 3.1)

Scientific classification
- Kingdom: Animalia
- Phylum: Chordata
- Class: Mammalia
- Order: Rodentia
- Family: Cricetidae
- Subfamily: Sigmodontinae
- Genus: Necromys
- Species: N. punctulatus

Binomial name
- Necromys punctulatus (Thomas, 1894)

Synonyms
- Bolomys punctulatus (Thomas, 1894)

Species of rodent

The spotted bolo mouse or Ecuadorian akodont (Necromys punctulatus) is a species of rodent in the family Cricetidae. It is known from Ecuador and may also occur in Colombia. Little is known of its status and range.

== Taxonomy ==
Necromys punctulatus is known from a single specimen in the Natural History Museum, London which was originally collected by the British zoologist Louis Fraser in Ecuador between 1857 and 1859. For a long time this was thought to be a subspecies of the short-tailed cane mouse (Zygodontomys brevicauda) but in 1991, the American zoologist Robert S. Voss examined the type specimen and came to the conclusion that it had many features in common with the hairy-tailed bolo mouse (Necromys lasiurus), then classified as Bolomys lasiurus, and placed it in the same genus, as Bolomys punctata. Both have since been transferred to the new genus Necromys.

== Description ==
The spotted bolo mouse is a medium-sized member of its genus, growing to a total length of 200 mm (8 in) including a tail of about 70 mm (2.8 in). The fur is short and harsh. The colour of the upper parts is mainly blackish, some hairs being streaked with grey and yellow, resulting in the cheeks, and the sides of the neck and body being somewhat olive. The underparts are whitish, the ears are brown and well-covered with hair, and the tail is two-coloured, dark above and pale beneath. The backs of the hands and feet are brownish-white, and the fifth digit on the feet is much reduced in size.

== Distribution ==
The spotted bolo mouse is found in eastern Ecuador and perhaps also in Colombia.

== Status ==
The International Union for Conservation of Nature lists the conservation status of the spotted bolo mouse as being "data deficient". This is because the organisation lacks up to date information on the extent of this mouse's range, any threats it faces, its current status and its ecological needs.
