= Paraguayan bolo mouse =

Conservation status
- Least Concern (IUCN 3.1)

Scientific classification
- Kingdom: Animalia
- Phylum: Chordata
- Class: Mammalia
- Order: Rodentia
- Family: Cricetidae
- Subfamily: Sigmodontinae
- Genus: Necromys
- Species: N. lenguarum

Binomial name
- Necromys lenguarum (Thomas, 1898)

Species of rodent

The Paraguayan bolo mouse or Paraguayan akodont (Necromys lenguarum) is a species of rodent in the family Cricetidae. According to the IUCN, it is present in Bolivia, Paraguay, and Peru, and possibly also in Argentina and Brazil. It is found at elevations from 300 to 2,030 m (984 to 6,660 ft) in a variety of habitats, including cerrado, chaco, and heath pampas.

== Taxonomy ==
The taxonomic status of this species is unclear. It was at one time thought to be a subspecies of the dark bolo mouse N. obscurus, and some authorities consider it to be a synonym of N. lasiurus. Mitochondrial DNA analysis supports it being a species in its own right, but the precise range occupied by each species has not been elucidated.

== Description ==
The Paraguayan bolo mouse is a medium-sized species, being about 190 mm (7.5 in) long including a tail of 75 mm (3.0 in). The upper surface of head and body is dark grey, and the rump ochre-grey. The flanks are paler and the underparts are white, sometimes with a yellowish tinge. The tail is black above and white below, and the hands and feet have uniformly grey upper surfaces.

== Distribution ==
According to J. L. Patton, the Paraguayan bolo mouse is native to southeastern Peru, western Paraguay, and southwestern Brazil. Reported sightings from eastern Bolivia and Jujuy and Chaco provinces in northern Argentina need re-evaluation because they may be of the much more widespread N. lasiurus.

== Status ==
The Paraguayan bolo mouse is a common species with a wide range. It is assumed to have a large total population and is capable of tolerating disturbance to its habitat such as clearance of vegetation for cattle ranching. The International Union for Conservation of Nature has assessed its conservation status as being of "least concern".
