= Valle del Arroyo Cuña-Pirú Reserve =

Nature reserve in Argentina

- Reserva Privada de Usos Múltiples Valle del Cuña Pirú
- Location within Argentina
- Nearest city: Aristóbulo del Valle (Misiones)
- Coordinates: 27.124173°S 54.950454°W
- Area: 5,492 to 6,144 hectares (13,570 to 15,180 acres)
- Designation: Private nature reserve
- Created: 2000
- Administrator: National University of La Plata

The Valle del Arroyo Cuña-Pirú Reserve (Spanish: Reserva Privada de Usos Múltiples Valle del Cuña Pirú) is a private nature reserve in the Misiones Province of Argentina.

== Location ==
The Valle del Arroyo Cuña-Pirú Reserve is divided between the municipalities of Aristóbulo del Valle in the Cainguás department and Ruiz de Montoya in the Libertador General San Martín department of Misiones. Depending on the source, it has an area of 5,492 to 6,144 hectares (13,570 to 15,180 acres). It is on the middle part of the Arroyo Cuña Pirú, a stream, near Aristóbulo del Valle. The reserve complements the Salto Encantado Provincial Park and the Cuñá Pirú Municipal Nature Park. It would be part of the proposed Trinational Biodiversity Corridor, which aims to provide forest connections between conservation units in Brazil, Paraguay and Argentina in the Upper Paraná ecoregion.

== History ==
The land was donated to National University of La Plata (UNLP) in 1992 by the paper company Celulose Argentina. In 1994 the local Mbayá people who live in the reserve began to dispute ownership with the UNLP. The Valle del Arroyo Cuña-Pirú Reserve was created by an agreement between the UNLP and the provincial government, formalized by provincial decree 841 of 2000. As of 2007 the Mbayá people still considered that their claims had not been resolved.

== Environment ==
The reserve is in the Alto Paraná Atlantic forests ecoregion. It covers an area of transition between the Selvas Mixtas and Campos environments. A study of mammals in the reserve published in 2011 identified 58 native species and three exotic species. These included 11 species in the family Cricetidae and 7 species in the family Didelphidae. The Brazilian guinea pig (Cavia aperea), big lutrine opossum (Lutreolina crassicaudata) and hairy-tailed bolo mouse (Necromys lasiurus) were found only in cultivated or natural fields. The giant anteater (Myrmecophaga tridactyla) and giant otter (Pteronura brasiliensis), important food species for the Mbayá people who live in the reserve, have probably been extirpated due to over-hunting. Large mammals such as the South American tapir (Tapirus terrestris) and Jaguar (Panthera onca) are also at risk of local extinction due to hunting.

== Sources ==
- Araújo Corte, Dione Angélica de; Valladares-Pádua, Cláudio Benedito (November 2007), Plano de Manejo da Estação Ecológica Mico-Leão-Preto (PDF) (in Portuguese), Brasília: ICMBio, archived from the original (PDF) on 2016-11-07
- Chebez, Juan Carlos (2005), Guía de las reservas naturales de la Argentina, Editorial Albatros, ISBN 978-950-24-1058-6
- Cirignoli, Sebastián; Galliari, Carlos A.; Pardiñas, Ulyses F. J.; Podestá, Darío H.; Abramson, Raúl (2011), "Mamíferos de la Reserva Valle del Cuña Pirú, Misiones, Argentina" (PDF), Mastozoología Neotropical (in Spanish), 18 (1), ISSN 0327-9383
- Ottenheimer, Ana Cristina; Zubrzycki, Bernarda; García, Stella Maris; Tamagno, Liliana (2007), Etnografía de la política universitaria. Parte II. La UNLP y los Mbya Guaraní del Cuña Pirú (Misiones, Argentina). (PDF) (in Spanish), Buenos Aires: Universidad Nacional de La Plata, archived from the original (PDF) on 2016-08-22
