= San Rafael National Park =

Protected area in Itapúa, Paraguay

- Parque Nacional San Rafael
- IUCN category II (national park)
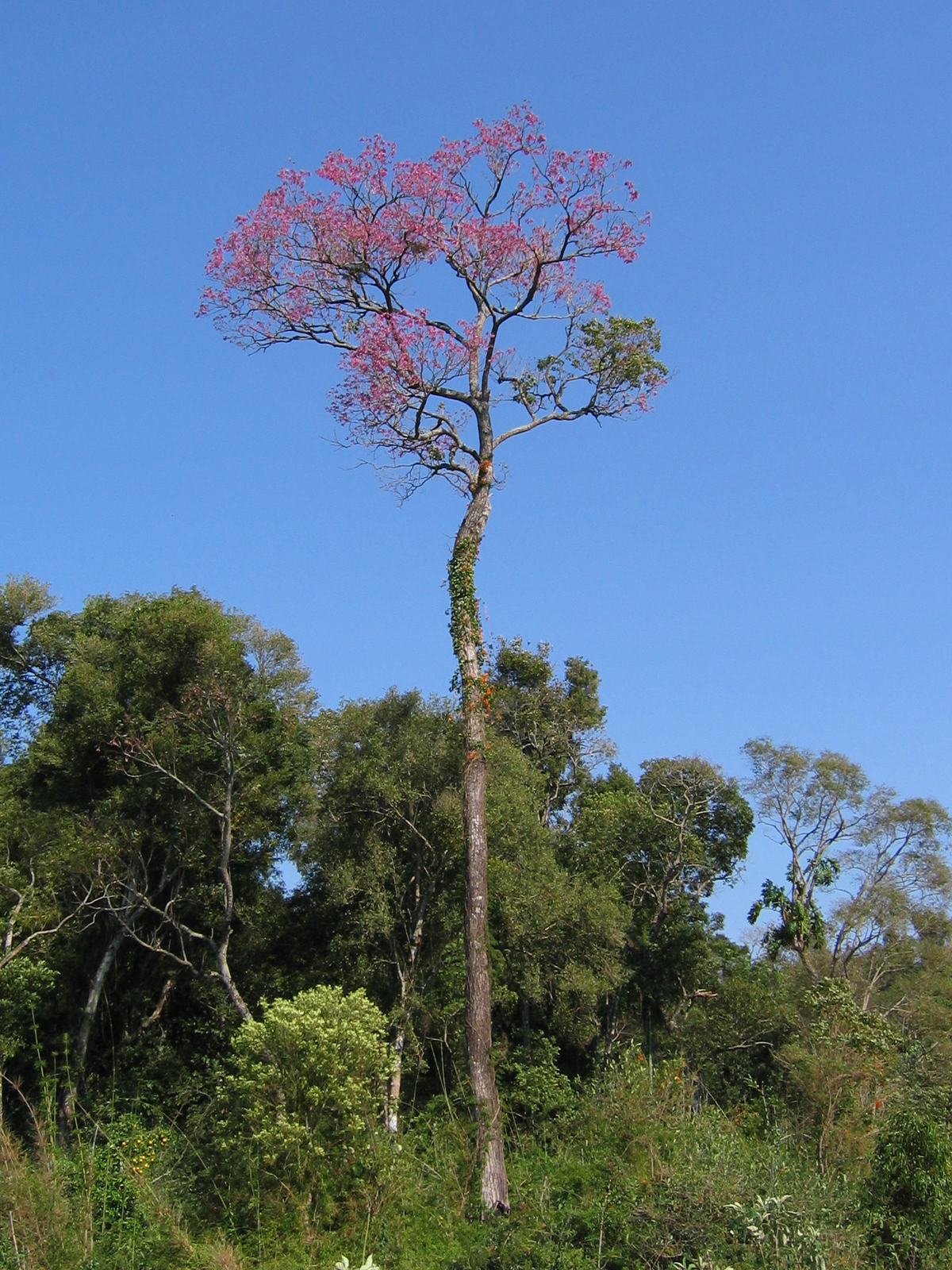
- Handroanthus impetiginosus in the San Rafael Reserve

- Location within Paraguay
- Nearest city: Itapúa Department, Paraguay
- Coordinates: 26°27′30″S 55°41′51″W
- Area: 69,304 hectares (171,250 acres)
- Designation: National park
- Created: 1992
- Administrator: none

San Rafael National Park (Spanish: Parque Nacional San Rafael) is a proposed national park in Paraguay covering an area of Atlantic Forest, grasslands, and wetlands. Though it was declared in 1992 that the area was to be reserved as a national park, no further steps have been taken to formalize its status. The area is under threat both from large-scale farming and from small slash-and-burn farmers.

== Location ==
The San Rafael National Park is divided between the Itapúa and Caazapá departments. It has an area of 69,304 hectares (171,250 acres). The park is in the upper Tebicuary River basin, in the San Rafael Hills. Elevations are from 100 to 500 metres (330 to 1,640 ft). The park would be part of the proposed Trinational Biodiversity Corridor, which aims to provide forest connections between conservation units in Brazil, Paraguay, and Argentina in the Upper Paraná ecoregion.

== Legal status ==
The park was declared an "Area Reserved for a National Park" in 1992, with an area of 78,000 hectares (190,000 acres). All of the land is privately owned, leading to disputes over the designation, and in 2002 the area was declared a "managed resources reserve". This is equivalent to the IUCN protected area category VI. The 2002 change was reversed in 2005. A decision regarding whether the park will formally be declared either a national park or a managed resources reserve is still pending. The NGO Guyra Paraguay has purchased 6,500 hectares (16,000 acres) of land in the park, which it manages as a protected area.

== Environment ==
Temperatures range from 17 to 23.8 °C (62.6 to 74.8 °F), with the hottest period in October–April and the coolest period in May–September. Average annual rainfall is 2,100 millimetres (83 in). Rain falls throughout the year, but the wettest months are October–February.

The park covers an area of Alto Paraná Lowland Atlantic Forest, a particularly threatened type of forest in the Atlantic Forest biome. San Rafael is in a region of transition from tall, humid forests in the Paraná River basin to lower, drier forests in the Paraguay River basin. About 80% of the area is forest-covered. It also has broad stretches of natural grasslands and wetlands in the northern part of Paraguay's mesopotamian grasslands.

== Fauna ==
Mammals include the jaguar (Panthera onca) and the South American tapir (Tapirus terrestris). The park is home to four globally threatened large mammals. Over 400 species of birds have been identified in the park, the greatest number of any site in Paraguay. Twelve of the species are globally threatened, including the vinaceous-breasted amazon (Amazona vinacea) and black-fronted piping guan (Pipile jacutinga). The park holds important populations of helmeted woodpecker (Celeus galeatus), russet-winged spadebill (Platyrinchus leucoryphus), cock-tailed tyrant (Alectrurus tricolor) and saffron-cowled blackbird (Xanthopsar flavus). The park has been designated an Important Bird Area (IBA) by BirdLife International because it supports significant populations of many bird species.

== Threats ==
As of 2016, there was no effective forest management. The soil is fertile, and there is pressure to allow the park area to be turned over to soya farming. From 1989 onward, the forest has been steadily cleared, and grassland has been converted for use as pasture or farmland. As of 2007, more than 22% of the original area had been drastically modified. The region is threatened by large-scale intensive agriculture, unsustainable slash-and-burn agriculture, and fires. Only a tenuous link now connects San Rafael to the Caazapá National Park.

== Sources ==
- Araújo Corte, Dione Angélica de; Valladares-Pádua, Cláudio Benedito (November 2007), Plano de Manejo da Estação Ecológica Mico-Leão-Preto (PDF) (in Portuguese), Brasília: ICMBio, archived from the original (PDF) on 2016-11-07
- Esquivel M., Alberto; Velázquez, Myriam C.; Bodrati, Alejandro; Fraga, Rosendo; Del Castillo, Hugo; Klavins, Juan; Clay, Robert P.; Madroño, Alberto; Peris, Salvador J. (2007), "Status of the avifauna of San Rafael National Park, one of the last large fragments of Atlantic Forest in Paraguay", Bird Conservation International, 17 (4), doi:10.1017/s095927090700086x, hdl:11336/80904
- Forests of Hope site - San Rafael, Paraguay, BirdLife International
- Parque Nacional San Rafael, ECOSARA
