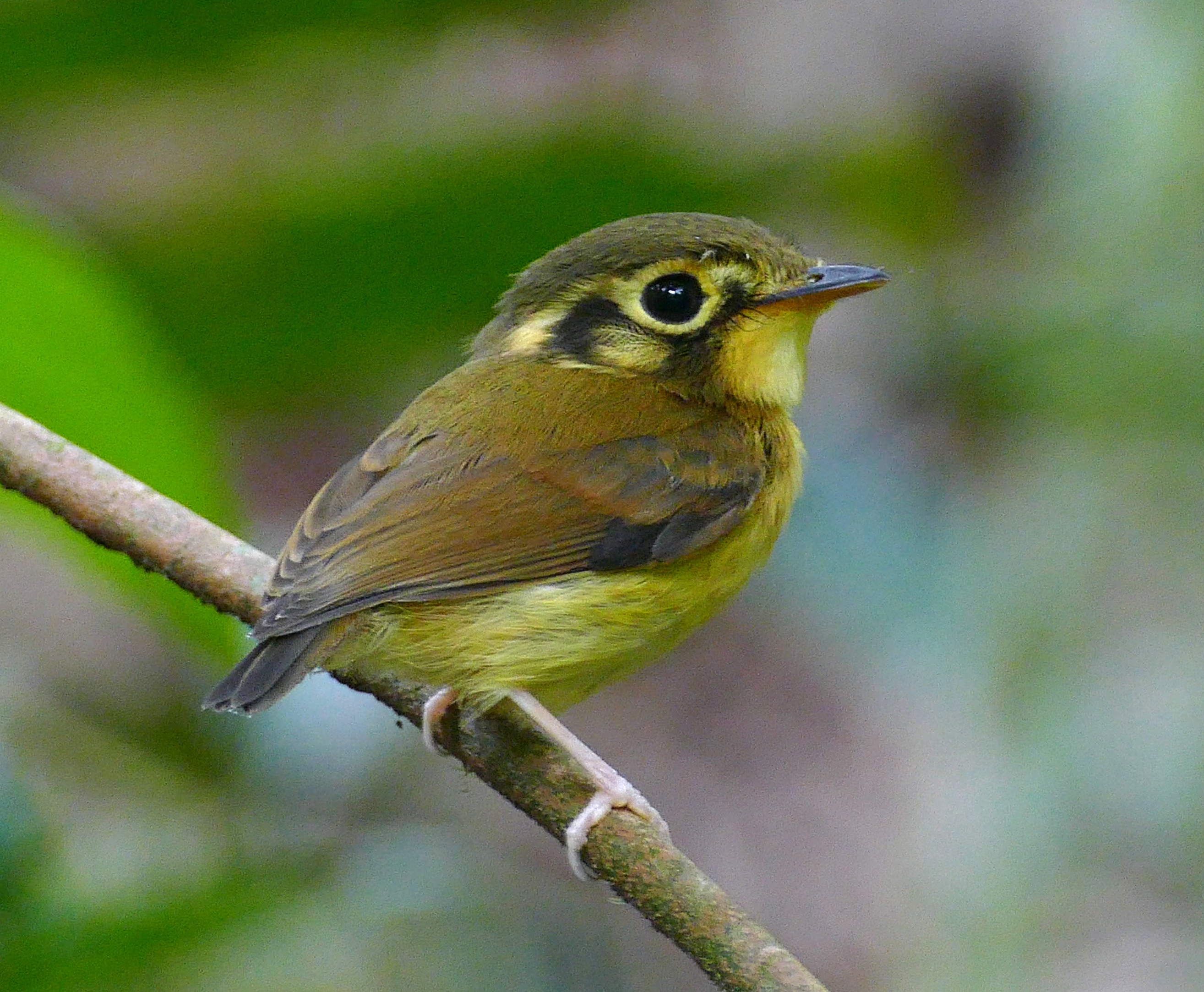

Conservation status
- Least Concern (IUCN 3.1)

- Least Concern (IUCN 3.1)

Scientific classification
- Kingdom: Animalia
- Phylum: Chordata
- Class: Aves
- Order: Passeriformes
- Family: Tyrannidae
- Genus: Platyrinchus
- Species: P. mystaceus

Binomial name
- Platyrinchus mystaceus Vieillot, 1818

= White-throated spadebill =

Species of bird

The white-throated spadebill (Platyrinchus mystaceus) is a tiny passerine bird in the family Tyrannidae, the tyrant flycatchers. It is found in Costa Rica, Panama, on Trinidad and Tobago, and in every mainland South American country except Chile, French Guiana, Uruguay, and Suriname.

== Taxonomy and systematics ==
The white-throated spadebill's taxonomy has not been settled. The International Ornithological Committee (IOC), the Clements taxonomy, and the American Ornithological Society (AOS) assign it these 14 subspecies:

- P. m. neglectus (Todd, 1919)
- P. m. perijanus Phelps, WH & Phelps, WH Jr, 1954
- P. m. albogularis Sclater, PL, 1860
- P. m. zamorae (Chapman, 1924)
- P. m. partridgei Short, 1969
- P. m. insularis Allen, JA, 1889
- P. m. imatacae Zimmer, JT & Phelps, WH, 1945
- P. m. ventralis Phelps, WH & Phelps, WH Jr, 1955
- P. m. duidae Zimmer, JT, 1939
- P. m. ptaritepui Zimmer, JT & Phelps, WH, 1946
- P. m. mystaceus Vieillot, 1818
- P. m. bifasciatus Allen, JA, 1889
- P. m. cancromus Temminck, 1820
- P. m. niveigularis Pinto, 1954

However, BirdLife International's Handbook of the Birds of the World (HBW) treats the first five subspecies as the "western white-throated spadebill" (P. albogularis) and the other nine as the "eastern white-throated spadebill" (P. mystaceus). One author who advocates the two-species model calls them respectively the "white-throated" and "yellow-crested" spadebills. The Clements taxonomy and the AOS partition the subspecies as the albogularis and mystaceus groups within the species.

What is now the stub-tailed spadebill (P. cancrominus) was treated by several early twentieth century authors as another subspecies of P. mystaceus.

This article follows the one species, 14 subspecies, model, though the "western" and "eastern" groups are at times treated separately.

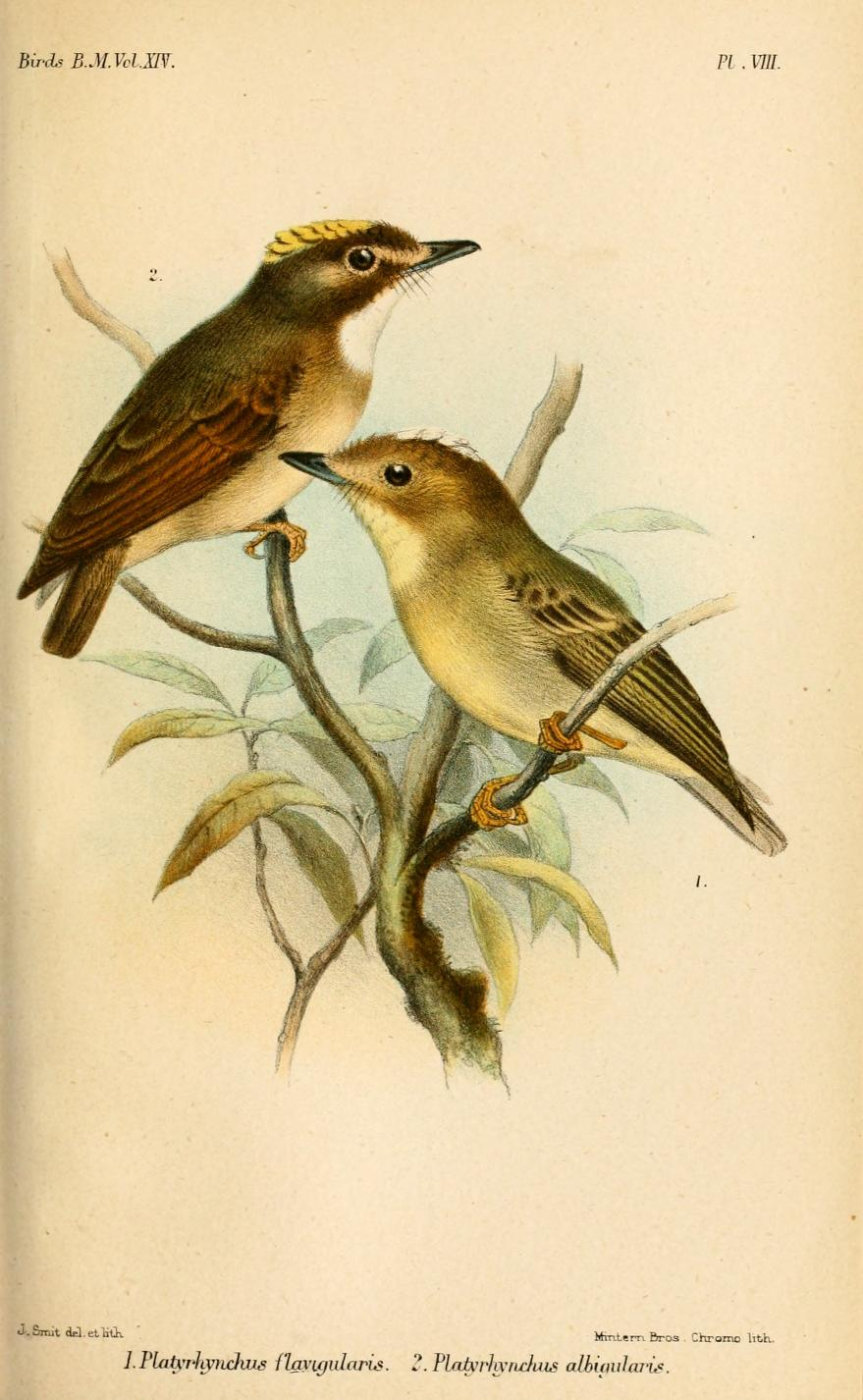
White-throated spadebill (above), and yellow-throated spadebill (below); illustration by Joseph Smit, 1888

== Description ==
The white-throated spadebill is about 9 to 11 cm (3.5 to 4.3 in) long and weighs 7.5 to 12 g (0.26 to 0.42 oz). It has a large head with a bold facial pattern and a stubby tail. The sexes have almost the same plumage. Males of the nominate subspecies P. m. mystaceus have a dark olive-brown crown with a partially hidden yellow patch in the center; females have much smaller patch or none at all. Both sexes have pale buff-yellow as a patch above the lores, as an eye-ring, as a stripe behind the eye, and as a patch on the ear coverts. Their lores are dark blackish brown that continues as a stripe to beneath the eye and reappears as a patch on the ear coverts. Their upperparts, wings, and tail are olive-brown. Their throat is whitish to pale yellow and their underparts mostly creamy buff to ochraceous. Their breast and sides sometimes have a tawny to olive wash and their belly has an ochre tinge. Juveniles do not have the crown patch; they have brighter rufescent upperparts than adults, with a pale grayish brown throat and breast and a buffish white belly. Adults have a dark brown to grayish brown iris, a wide flat bill with a black maxilla and an off-white to pale gray mandible, and pale pinkish to grayish pink legs and feet.

The other eight subspecies of the "eastern" white-throated spadebill differ from the nominate and each other thus:

- P. m. insularis: more greenish olive upperparts and paler and whiter belly than nominate, with olive-buff on breast appearing as a distinct band
- P. m. imatacae: gray-tinged crown, yellowish buff breast, and yellowish white belly
- P. m. ventralis: brighter yellow crown patch and darker ochre underparts than nominate; bill has a pinkish tip on the mandible
- P. m. duidae: like insularis with darker upperparts and ochre-tinged underparts
- P. m. ptaritepui: paler crown patch than nominate and an all dark bill
- P. m. bifasciatus: strongly greenish upperparts, buffy yellow underparts, and pale wing bars
- P. m. cancromus: essentially the same as nominate
- P. m. niveigularis: pure white throat

Subspecies P. m. albogularis is the nominate of the "western" white-throated spadebill group and differs substantially from P. m. mystaceus. Males have the same dark olive crown and yellow patch as the nominate, though the yellow sometimes has a buff tinge. Like the nominate, females have little or no yellow on the crown. In both sexes the loral streak is dull white and their eye-ring bright white. They have an indistinct brownish buff spot on the ear coverts. Their upperparts are mostly brownish olive to reddish brown with paler uppertail coverts. They have one faint wing bar. Their tail is dusky with brown edges on the feathers. Their throat and foreneck are white, their upper breast buffy brown, their lower breast and belly pale yellow, and their undertail coverts white. They have a dark reddish brown to brown iris, a wide flat black bill with sometimes a pinkish tip on the mandible, and gray to pinkish gray legs and feet.

The other four subspecies of the "western" white-throated spadebill differ from albogularis and each other thus:

- P. m. neglectus: similar to albogularis
- P. m. perijanus: olivaceous upperparts
- P. m. zamorae: similar to albogularis
- P. m. partridgei: intermediate between the other three "western" subspecies and the nine "eastern" subspecies

== Distribution and habitat ==
The subspecies of the white-throated spadebill are found thus:

- P. m. neglectus: highlands of most of the length of Costa Rica south into Panama; northern and central Colombia to Boyacá Department and the Santa Marta region and into Táchira in far western Venezuela (Note: A study published in 2002 extended the species' range south along the Eastern Andes of Colombia.)
- P. m. perijanus: Serranía del Perijá straddling the Colombia-Venezuela border
- P. m. albogularis: in Colombia, valleys of Cauca and Magdalena rivers and Pacific slope of Western Andes continuing south on the western slope of the Andes of most of Ecuador
- P. m. zamorae: eastern slope of the Andes in Ecuador and into Peru as far as western Madre de Dios Department
- P. m. partridgei: from southern Puno Department in far southeastern Peru into western and central Bolivia
- P. m. insularis: Trinidad, Tobago, across northern Venezuela from Falcón and Mérida into western Guyana and south in the Orinoco River valley into northwestern Bolívar; possibly further east into French Guiana (Note: The South American Classification Committee of the AOS has no records of the white-throated spadebill in French Guiana.)
- P. m. imatacae: Sierra de Imataca in northeastern Bolívar
- P. m. ventralis: Cerro de la Neblina on the border of extreme southern Venezuela and northwestern Brazil
- P. m. duidae: tepuis where Venezuela, Guyana, and Brazil meet
- P. m. ptaritepui: Sororopán-, Ptari-, and Aprada-tepuis in southeastern Bolívar
- P. m. mystaceus: southeastern Brazil from southern Mato Grosso south and into eastern Paraguay and northeastern Argentina's Misiones and Corrientes provinces
- P. m. bifasciatus: from central Mato Grosso east to central Goiás in southern Brazil and possibly into northern Bolivia
- P. m. cancromus: eastern Brazil roughly bounded by central Maranhão, Ceará, northern Bahia, eastern Paraná, and eastern Santa Catarina
- P. m. niveigularis: separate from all other subspecies; coastal northeastern Brazil from Paraíba south to Alagoas

The white-throated spadebill inhabits a variety of wooded landscapes, with some differences between the groups. All favor the forest understory. The "western" subspecies are found in humid foothill and montane forest, drier forest, gallery forest, and mature secondary woodlands; they also occur at brushy and bamboo-thicket forest edges and locally in lowlands. In eastern Colombia the species appears to favor undergrowth with many epiphytes and hemiepiphytes (e.g., Clusiaceae). In elevation they range between 700 and 2,100 m (2,300 and 6,900 ft) in Costa Rica, 750 and 1,800 m (2,500 and 5,900 ft) in Panama, 400 and 2,400 m (1,300 and 7,900 ft) in Colombia, 600 and 2,000 m (2,000 and 6,600 ft) on the western slope and 1,000 and 2,000 m (3,300 and 6,600 ft) on the eastern in Ecuador, and mostly 800 and 2,000 m (2,600 and 6,600 ft) but locally as low as 400 m (1,300 ft) in Peru.

The "eastern" subspecies are found primarily in the lowlands. There and in the foothills they inhabit humid forest, gallery forest, and mature secondary woodland; like the "western" they also occur in bamboo at the edge of forest. In elevation they range from sea level to 1,300 m (4,300 ft) in Brazil and to 1,800 m (5,900 ft) in Venezuela.

== Behavior ==
=== Movement ===
The white-throated spadebill is a year-round resident.

=== Feeding ===
The white-throated spadebill feeds on arthropods. It typically forages in pairs, rarely joins mixed-species feeding flocks (though more often in Colombia), and occasionally attends army ant swarms. It feeds mostly in dense vegetation in the forest's understory. It sits still, typically about 0.3 to 5 m (1 to 16 ft) above the ground, and captures prey mostly with short upward sallies from the perch to grab it from the underside of leaves and twigs. Its bill makes an audible snap during prey capture.

=== Breeding ===
The white-throated spadebill's breeding season varies geographically. It spans at least March to May in Costa Rica, May to July in northern Colombia and on Trinidad, October to December in southeastern Brazil, and September to November in extreme southern Brazil. It includes December in eastern Colombia, June on Tobago, and March in extreme southern Venezuela. Males of all subspecies court with song while raising their crown patch into a fan and make a flight display during which their wings whirr. A few nests have been found. One in Costa Rica was a smooth cone shaped cup made from fungal rhizomorphs, plant fibers, dead leaves, and a piece of snakeskin. One in Peru was similar but covered entirely with very pale plant matter. One on Trinidad was a deep cup made from dead grass and other plant fiber held together with spider web and lined with black fibers. A similar one in southeastern Brazil was covered with dead leaves. The nests were placed between about 0.5 and 3 m (2 and 10 ft) above the ground in small trees or shrubs. A clutch of a "western" bird was two yellowish white eggs with a few rufous spots. One of an "eastern" bird was two creamy-white eggs with reddish or brown marks. The latter clutch's incubation period was at least 11 days and fledging occurred 14 to 19 days after hatch.

=== Vocalization ===
The "western" white-throated spadebills sing "a high, thin, rattling trill, 'pe'e'e'e'e'e'e'e'e'e'e'eet', rising slightly and sometimes preceded by [an] abrupt 'squek' note" and their call is a "short and sharp 'squeep' ". The song and call have also been described respectively as "a rattled trill, ascending at least in east [Ecuador], that increases in volume" and "an abrupt, sharp 'squik!' ". The "eastern" white-throated spadebills sing "a prolonged, bubbling or squeaky, slightly descending trill" and their call is "an irregular series of sharp, individual 'weet' notes, occasionally lengthened to 'WEET-tu-tu' ". Subspecies P. m. partridgei, whose appearance is intermediate between those of the "eastern" and other "western" birds, sings "a falling then rising series of notes, with the introductory and end notes well pronounced and on a similar pitch".

== Status ==
The IUCN follows HBW taxonomy and therefore has separately assessed the "western" and "eastern" white-throated spadebills. Both are assessed as being of Least Concern. The "western" birds have a large range and the "eastern" birds a very large one. The sizes of their populations are not known and both are believed to be decreasing. No immediate threats to either have been identified. The white-throated spadebill is considered common in Costa Rica and Peru, "at most fairly common" in Colombia, "widespread" in Ecuador, and "fairly common and widespread" in Venezuela. It occurs in many protected areas but has "suffered from deforestation in lowlands in some areas".
