= Papel Misionero Natural Cultural Reserve =

Protected area in Misiones, Argentina

- Reserva natural cultural Papel Misionero
- IUCN category V (protected landscape/seascape)
- Location within Argentina
- Nearest city: El Soberbio, Misiones
- Coordinates: 26°59′05″S 54°14′23″W
- Area: 10,397 hectares (25,690 acres)
- Designation: Natural cultural reserve
- Created: 1994
- Administrator: Fundación Selva Misionera

The Papel Misionero Natural Cultural Reserve (Spanish: Reserva natural cultural Papel Misionero) is a natural cultural reserve in the Misiones Province of Argentina.

== Location ==
The Papel Misionero Natural Cultural Reserve is 45 kilometres (28 mi) from the town of El Soberbio, Misiones. It has an area of 10,397 hectares (25,690 acres). It is a protected area with managed resources, administered by the Fundación Selva Misionera. The reserve is in the Alto Paraná Atlantic forests ecoregion. The land is privately owned, and visitors are not allowed. It would be part of the proposed Trinational Biodiversity Corridor, which aims to provide forest connections between conservation units in Brazil, Paraguay and Argentina in the Upper Paraná ecoregion.

== History ==
The land was acquired by the Papel Misionero (Note: As of 2015 the Papel Misionero company had a total of 23,000 hectares (57,000 acres) of land, with 70% covered in native forest. The company uses 30% of its own forest, planted with pine, to feed its industrial plant, and also obtains wood from small local producers.) company in 1978. The Papel Misionero Natural Cultural Reserve was created in 1994. The objective is to protect a mature forest and a community of Guaraní people. It was formalized by provincial law 3.256 of 1995. In 1996 it was made part of the Yabotí Biosphere Reserve (Note: The Yabotí Biosphere Reserve consists of the Kaa Yarí Provincial Park, Guarani Experimental Area, Papel Misionero Natural Cultural Reserve, Moconá Provincial Park and Esmeralda Provincial Park, as well as private properties that make up the largest area of the reserve.) by law 3.375. A bill in 2003 proposed that the site be declared of public utility and subject to purchase or expropriation to create a Natural Cultural Reserve under the full control of the province.

The reserve contains three villages of Mbayá people with a population in 2016 of about 340. In 2011 the owner signed an agreement with the communities to recognise their ownership of 370 hectares (910 acres) of land, which could be cultivated, and for mutual cooperation in conservation. The local people would have access to the reserve to extract material for handicrafts, medicine and subsistence.

== Environment ==
The reserve contains mountain forest vegetation in a good state of conservation. 70% of the reserve is covered by native forest. Another 30% is being reforested with pine for commercial use. The reserve has diverse ecosystems including lagoons and areas of tree ferns, and giant trees with heights of 33 metres (108 ft) and diameter of 9.5 metres (31 ft).

37 species of mammals have been identified. Mammals include South American tapir (Tapirus terrestris), white-lipped peccary (Tayassu pecari), water opossum (Chironectes minimus), giant anteater (Myrmecophaga tridactyla), greater naked-tailed armadillo (Cabassous tatouay), ocelot (Leopardus pardalis), jaguar (Panthera onca) and black howler (Alouatta caraya). Birds include black-and-white hawk-eagle (Spizaetus melanoleucus), pheasant cuckoo (Dromococcyx phasianellus), rusty-barred owl (Strix hylophila), glittering-bellied emerald (Chlorostilbon lucidus), thick-billed saltator (Saltator maxillosus) and black-throated grosbeak (Saltator fuliginosus).

== Sources ==
- Araújo Corte, Dione Angélica de; Valladares-Pádua, Cláudio Benedito (November 2007), Plano de Manejo da Estação Ecológica Mico-Leão-Preto (PDF) (in Portuguese), Brasília: ICMBio, archived from the original (PDF) on 2016-11-07
- La reserva natural cultural de Papel Misionero es el único reducto de la Selva Paranaense inalterado en la provincia (in Spanish), Servicio de Prensa FORESTAL, 25 January 2015
- "Reserva Natural Cultural Papel Misionero", Ruta de la Selva (in Spanish)
- Reserva Cultural Natural Papel Misionero, SIB: Sistema de Información sobre Biodiversidad, archived from the original on 2016-08-15
- Reserva Cultural Natural Papel Misionero (in Spanish), SIFAP: Sistema Federal de Áreas Protegidas, archived from the original on 2016-08-18
- Rocha, Laura (8 January 2016), "Una reserva privada, reducto de la selva paranaense", La Nacio, archived from the original on 2016-08-19
- San Pedro (in Spanish), Acampante.com » Campings en Argentina
