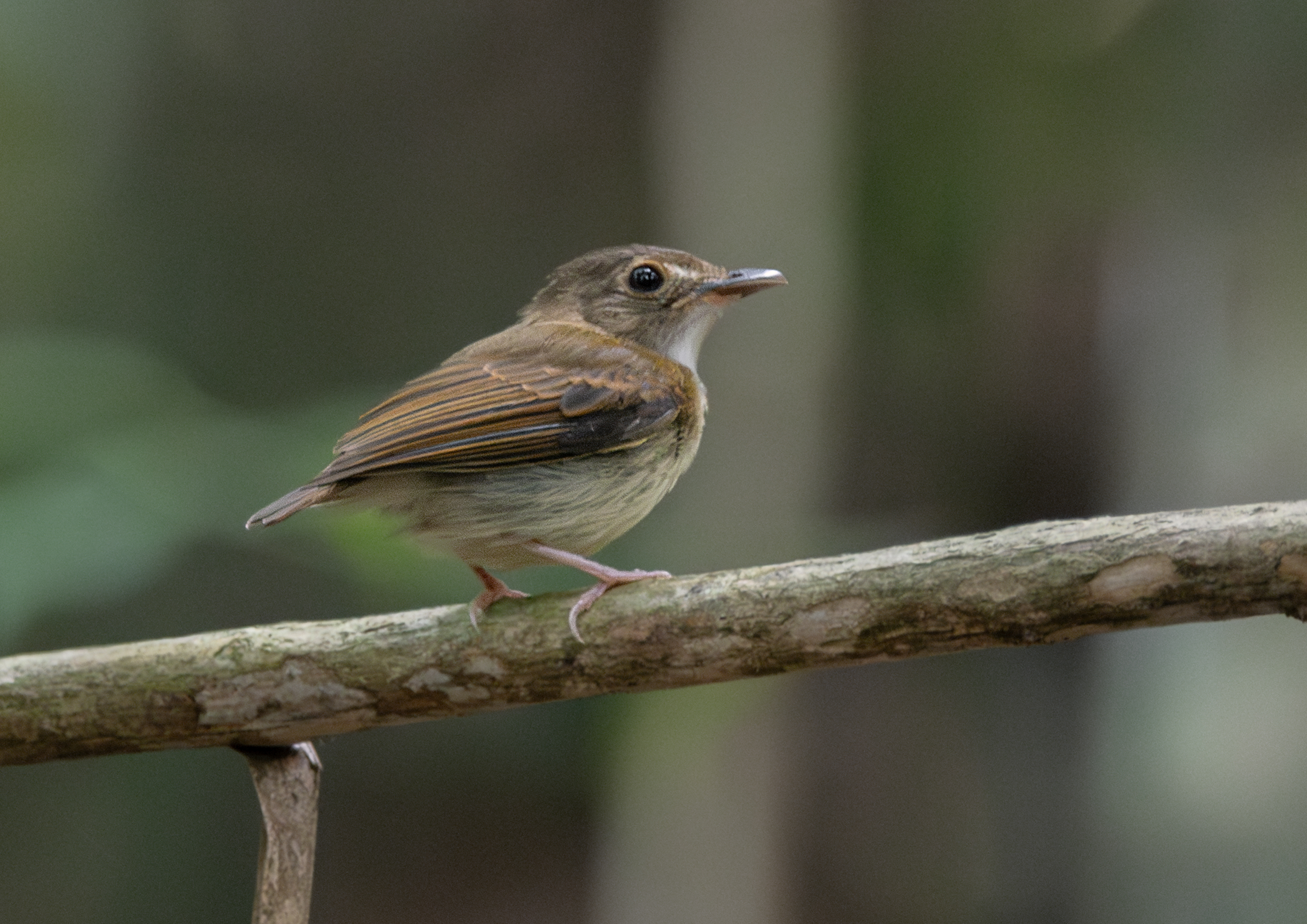

Conservation status
- Least Concern (IUCN 3.1)

Scientific classification
- Kingdom: Animalia
- Phylum: Chordata
- Class: Aves
- Order: Passeriformes
- Family: Tyrannidae
- Genus: Platyrinchus
- Species: P. saturatus

Binomial name
- Platyrinchus saturatus Salvin & Godman, 1882

= Cinnamon-crested spadebill =

Species of bird

The cinnamon-crested spadebill (Platyrinchus saturatus) is a species of bird in the family Tyrannidae, the tyrant flycatchers. It is found in Brazil, Colombia, Ecuador, French Guiana, Guyana, Peru, Suriname, and Venezuela.

== Taxonomy and systematics ==
The cinnamon-crested spadebill has two subspecies, the nominate P. s. saturatus (Salvin & Godman, 1882), and P. s. pallidiventris (Novaes, 1968).

== Description ==
The cinnamon-crested spadebill is 9 to 9.5 cm (3.5 to 3.7 in) long and weighs 8.8 to 15 g (0.31 to 0.53 oz). The sexes have the same plumage. Adults of the nominate subspecies have a mostly dark rufous-brown head with a partially concealed orange-rufous patch on the crown, a buffish white spot above the lores, and an inconspicuous pale eye-ring. Their back, rump, and uppertail coverts are dark rufous-brown. Their wings are mostly dark rufous-brown with a dusky patch at the base of the primaries and rufescent edges on all the flight feathers. Their tail is stubby and dark rufous-brown. Their throat is white, their breast and sides whitish washed with olive, and their belly pale yellow. Subspecies P. s. pallidiventris has a more orange-yellow crown patch, a darker olive breast, and a brighter yellow belly than the nominate. Both subspecies have a brown iris, a wide flat black bill with sometimes a more grayish mandible, and pale pinkish cream legs and feet.

== Distribution and habitat ==
The cinnamon-crested spadebill has a disjunct distribution. The nominate subspecies has a large continuous range from Meta Department in central Colombia east through Amazonas and Bolívar states in southern Venezuela, the Guianas, and northern Brazil from the upper Negro River to the Atlantic in Amapá and northern Pará. Separate populations are found in northern Sucumbíos Province in northeastern Ecuador and in southern Loreto Province in northeastern Peru. Subspecies P. s. pallidiventris is found in Brazil south of the Amazon between the Tapajós River and northern Maranhão and locally in eastern Rondônia and northern Mato Grosso.

The cinnamon-crested spadebill primarily inhabits terra firme forest, where it greatly favors brushy undergrowth and dense stands of saplings. In Peru it is mostly found in forest on nutrient-poor sandy soils in blackwater river basins. In elevation it reaches 300 m (1,000 ft) in Colombia, 200 m (700 ft) in Ecuador, and 900 m (3,000 ft) in Venezuela and Brazil.

== Behavior ==
=== Movement ===
The cinnamon-crested spadebill is a year-round resident.

=== Feeding ===
The cinnamon-crested spadebill feeds on arthropods. It typically forages singly or in pairs, sometimes joins mixed-species feeding flocks, and occasionally attends army ant swarms. It feeds mostly in the forest's understory. It sits still, typically about 1.5 to 3 m (5 to 10 ft) above the ground, and captures prey mostly with short upward sallies from the perch to grab it from the underside of leaves. It usually lands on a different perch than it started from.

=== Breeding ===
Nothing is known about the cinnamon-crested spadebill's breeding biology.

=== Vocalization ===
The subspecies of the cinnamon-crested spadebill have different vocalizations. In Venezuela the nominate gives "a sharp, nasal squik!" that rises, or a "more double-sounding squik-ik!". Those calls have also been described as a "high, sharp whit or whit-it" and "a simple, sharp, kwip, sometimes doubled to a kwi-dip or lengthened to a kwip, kwi-di-dip". What is identified as its song in Peru is "an accelerating series of metallic notes: tew-ti-tik-tik'tik'tik". Subspecies P. s. pallidiventris sings "a low-pitched, 3-to-6 note ka-knee-knee-knee-knee in little, slow, rattlelike or pulsating bursts".

== Status ==
The IUCN has assessed the cinnamon-crested spadebill as being of Least Concern. It has a large range; its population size is not known and is believed to be decreasing. No immediate threats have been identified. The species is generally uncommon to rare and "perhaps overlooked, as [it is] difficult to locate". It is considered rare in Colombia, "very rare and local" in Ecuador, "seemingly rare" in Peru, "uncommon or rare" in Venezuela, and "widely distributed and not uncommon" in Surinam.
