= Trinational Biodiversity Corridor =

- Corredor Trinacional de Biodiversidade
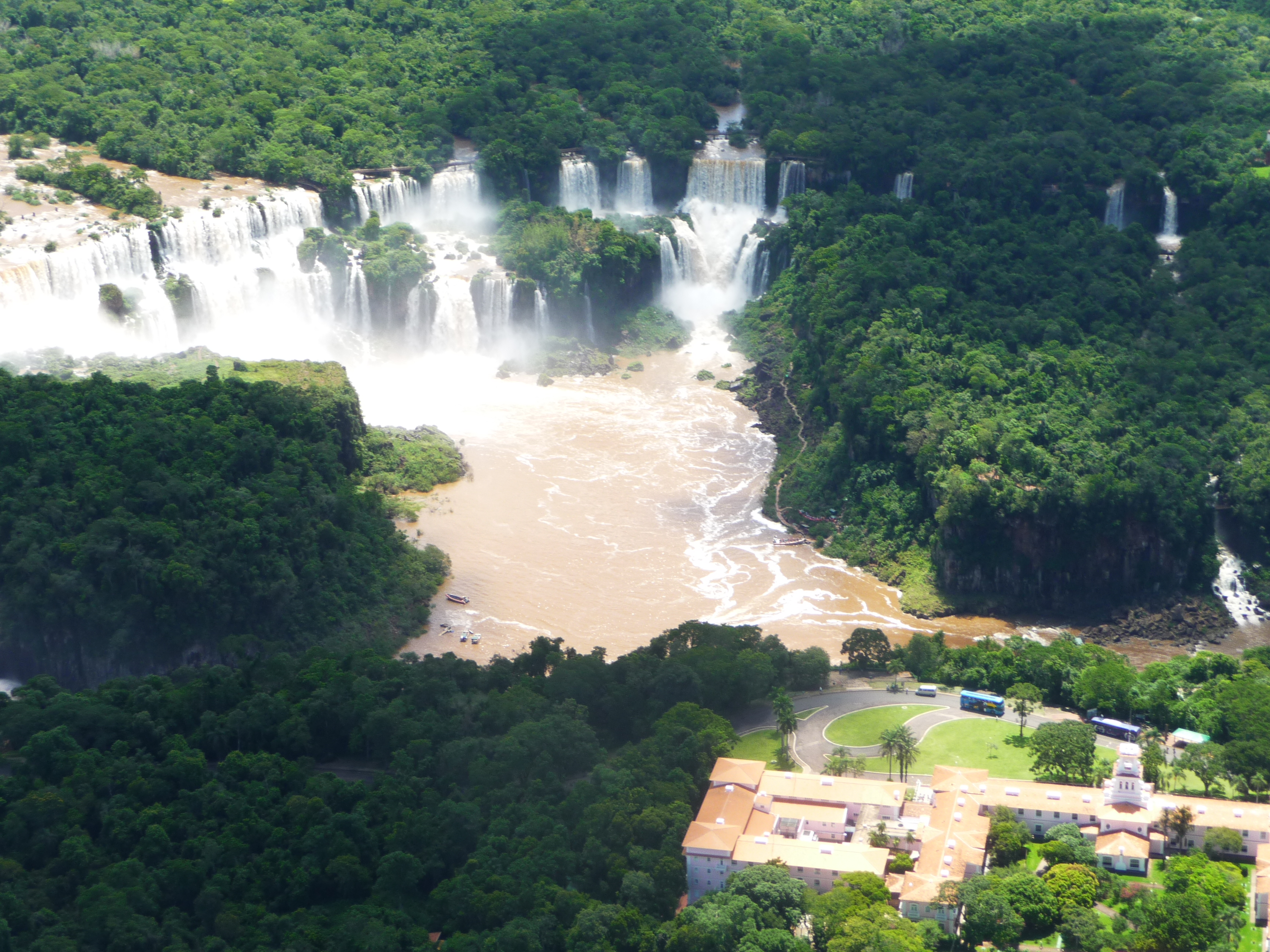
- The Iguazu Falls are in the center of the proposed corridor

- Location within Brazil
- Coordinates: 25.592344°S 54.593522°W
- Area: 570,000 hectares (1,400,000 acres)
- Designation: Ecological corridor

The Trinational Biodiversity Corridor (Portuguese: Corredor Trinacional de Biodiversidade) is a proposed ecological corridor that would link protected areas in the Alto Paraná Atlantic forests ecoregion in Brazil, Paraguay and Argentina.

== History ==
The proposed corridor was first discussed in 1999 in the Symposium on Research and Biodiversity in Umuarama, PR. The idea was refined later that year at the 3rd Workshop on Traditional Initiative and Sustainable Use of Inland Atlantic Forest in Misiones, Argentina. The Trinational Green Corridor Initiative was established in 1999 with elected national representatives of the protected areas, national and international community and private business conservation organizations, rural development and community organizations and representatives of international organizations and scientific institutions. The purpose was to assist the many players involved in using and managing the natural resources of the Parana Forest region to work together.

In 2000 the meeting organized by the World Wide Fund for Nature (WWF) and the Atlantic Forest NGO Network established the final design. The corridor would encompass conservation units in Brazil, Paraguay and Argentina in the Upper Paraná ecoregion. The concept was that the institutions responsible for these units would work together on a medium to long-term plan to connect the units by gradually restoring native vegetation in small regional corridors. The units alone would total 570,000 hectares (1,400,000 acres). The Trinational Commission on the Interior Atlantic Forest and the Green Corridor Initiative was set up to address action plans developed at various workshops in the early 2000s. The members were one representative from each national commission, a representative from the WWF and a representative from the International Union for Conservation of Nature (IUCN).

WWF has been helping develop a joint strategy for the corridor, and in 2014 partnered with the Inter-American Development Bank (IDB) to develop benchmark studies of transboundary parks, and of the Iguaçu National Park in particular. In July 2014 the IDB approved funding for the Iguaçu National Park in Brazil to include activities based on Biodiversity and Ecosystem Services (BES) to counter deforestation drivers in the area, with a view to expanding the approach to conservation units in Argentina and Paraguay.

== Challenges ==
Creation of the corridor has been delayed by lack of interest or resistance from the Brazilian government, mainly the Ministry of Foreign Affairs, which does not want to formally recognize a management space on the border between Brazil and other countries. The concept also faces local opposition. In October 2003 about 300 people with bulldozers invaded the Iguaçu National Park in an attempt to reopen the "Estrada do Colono" (Colonists' Road), which had been closed two years earlier because it divided the park in two and threatened the park's biological integrity. Dividing the park would in turn divide the corridor.

== Related initiatives ==
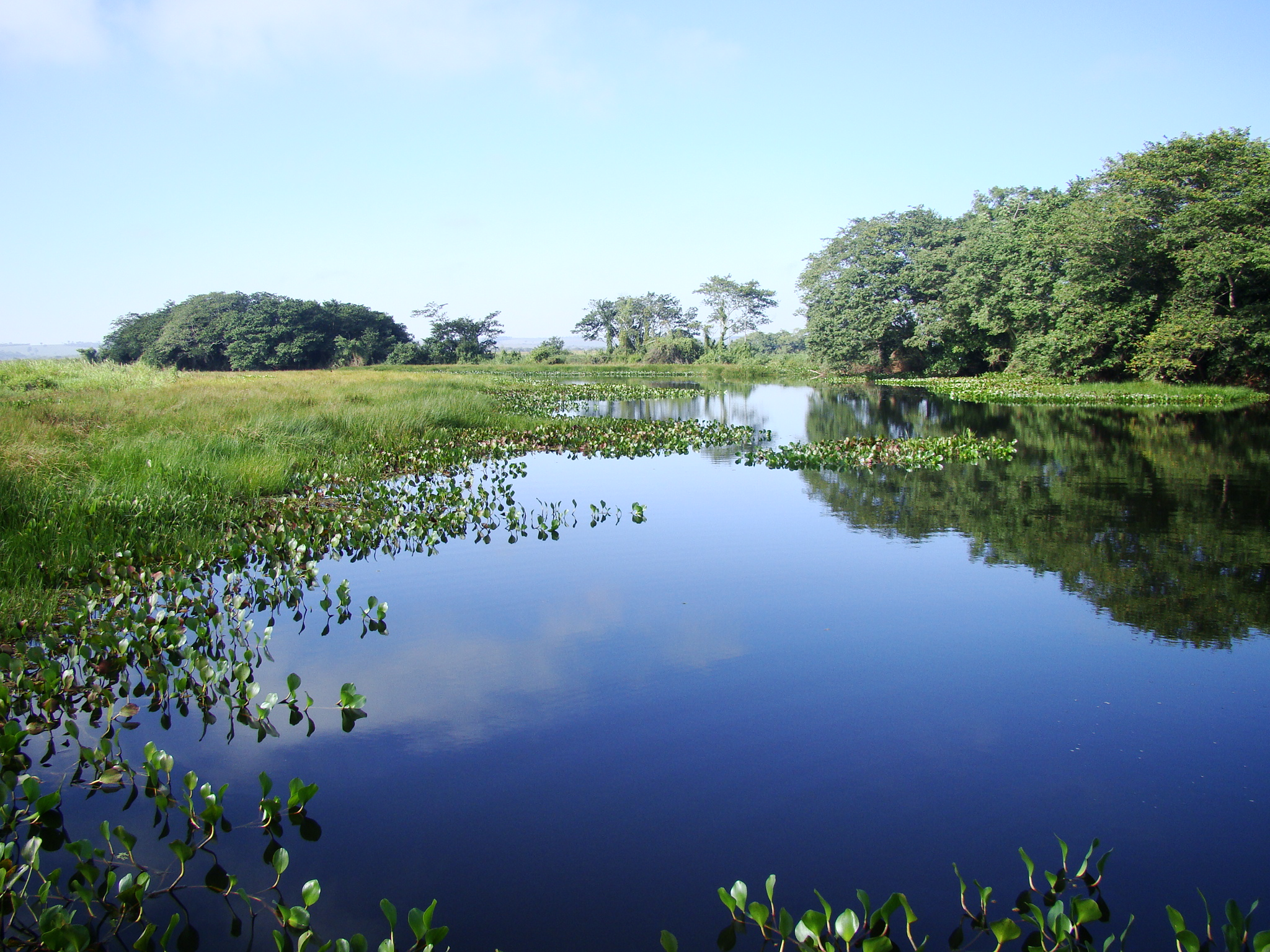
Saraiva in the Ilha Grande National Park

The Green Corridor Law was enacted in Argentina in 1999 to provide for conservation of the natural heritage of the Misiones province. The Trinational Initiative would use this area as a core but expand it to cover sites such as Brazil's Iguaçu National Park and Turvo State Park beside Moconá Falls, and Paraguay's Moisés Bertoni Reserve. The Paraná River Biodiversity Corridor aims to promote integrated environmental management between the conservation units in the Brazilian portion of the Paraná River basin, in the Guarani Aquifer recharge area. It maintains an interface with the Trinational Biodiversity Corridor.

== Extent ==
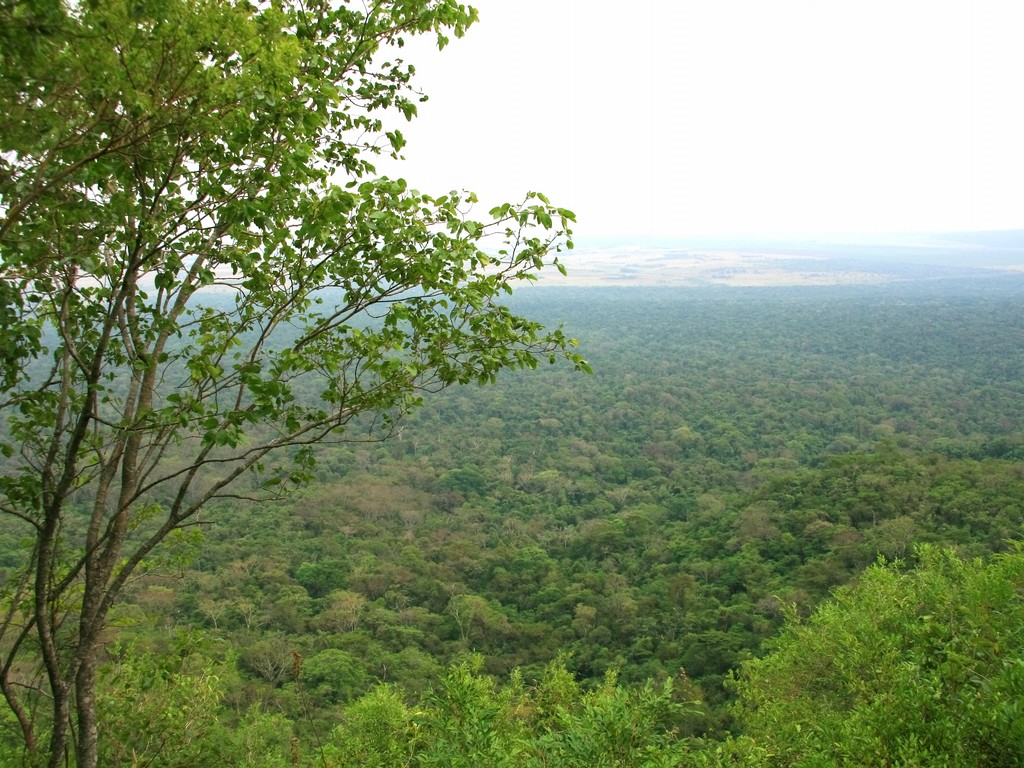
Morro do Diabo State Park

A large, continuous expanse of forest is needed to avoid genetic erosion of large mammals such as the jaguar, giant anteater and tapir, and birds such as the harpy eagle, parrots, macaws, toucans and hummingbirds that live in the forest. The tri-national corridor will provide a forest connection to maintain and restore biodiversity and ecological health in two natural World Heritage Sites, two UNESCO Biosphere Reserves, two national parks, and a number of provincial parks and private reserves. The Trinational Corridor will extend from the Morro do Diabo State Park in São Paulo state to the north to the Turvo State Park in Rio Grande do Sul state in the south. It may be possible to take a metapopulation approach to managing jaguars in the region.

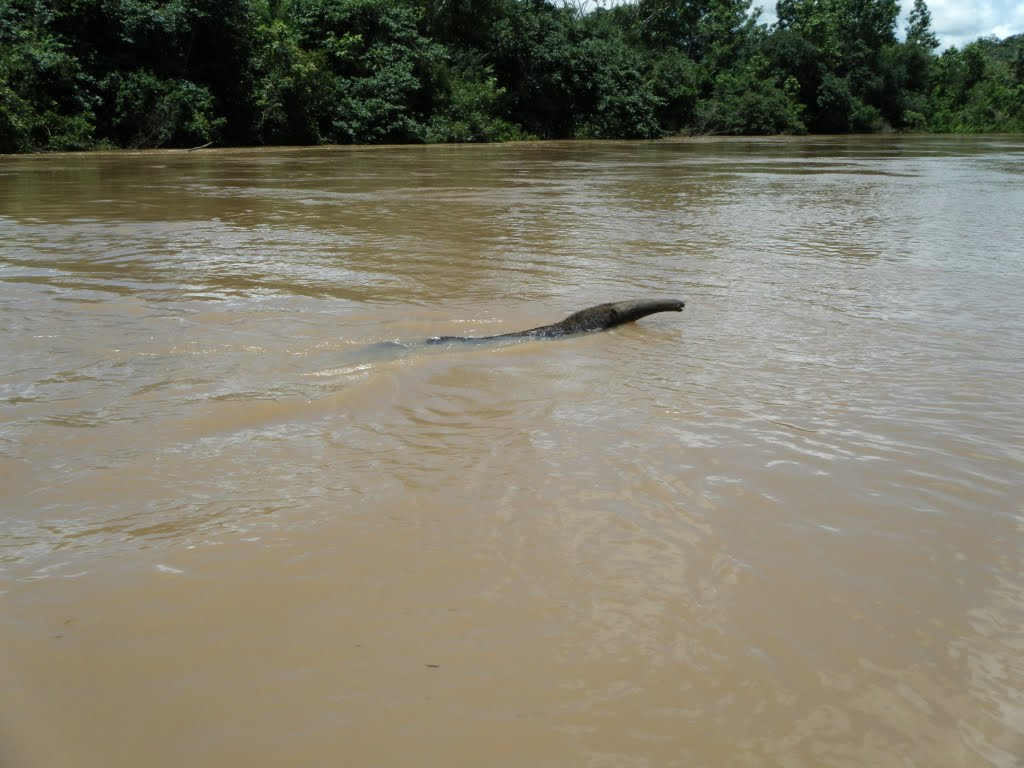
Giant anteater in Aguapeí State Park

The conservation units in the proposed corridor as of 2007 would be:

Name	Country	State / Dept / Province	Area (ha)
Aguapeí State Park	Brasil	São Paulo	9,043
Caiuá Ecological Station	Brasil	Paraná	1,427
Cisalpina Private Natural Heritage Reserve	Brasil	Mato Grosso do Sul	12,000
Esmeralda Provincial Park	Argentina	Misiones	31,619
Iguazú National Park	Argentina	Misiones	54,380
Iguazú National Reserve	Argentina	Misiones	12,620
Iguaçu National Park	Brasil	Paraná	170,000
Ilha Grande National Park	Brasil	Paraná; Mato Grosso do Sul	78,000
Lagoa São Paulo Forest Reserve	Brasil	São Paulo	945
Mbaracayú Forest Nature Reserve	Paraguay	Canindeyú	64,000
Mico Leão Preto Ecological Station	Brasil	São Paulo	6,677
Morro do Diabo State Park	Brasil	São Paulo	35,000
Pantanal Paulista Wildlife Refuge	Brasil	São Paulo	15,960
Papel Misionero Natural Cultural Reserve	Argentina	Misiones	10,397
Rio Ivinhema State Park	Brasil	Mato Grosso do Sul	73,000
Rio do Peixe State Park	Brasil	São Paulo	11,800
San Rafael National Park	Paraguay	Itapúa	78,000
Turvo State Park	Brasil	Rio Grande do Sul	17,000
Urugua-í Provincial Park	Argentina	Misiones	84,000
Valle del Arroyo Cuña-Pirú Reserve	Argentina	Misiones	12,495

== Sources ==
- Araújo Corte, Dione Angélica de; Valladares-Pádua, Cláudio Benedito (November 2007), Plano de Manejo da Estação Ecológica Mico-Leão-Preto (PDF) (in Portuguese), Brasília: ICMBio
- Bonello, Jenna (9 October 2003), Iguacu National Park Under Threat Again, WWF
- BR-T1307: Conservation of BES in the Atlantic Forest Tri-National Corridor of Iguazu National Park, IADB
- Corredor de Biodiversidade do rio Paraná (in Portuguese), CORIPA: Consórcio Intermunicipal Para Conservação do Remanescente do Rio Paraná e Áreas de Influência
- Corredor Trinacional é tema de reunião no Paraná (in Portuguese), Instituto Curicaca
- Crawshaw, Peter G. Jr.; Mahler, Jan K.; Indrusiak, Cibele; Cavalcanti, Sandra M.C.; Leite-Pitman, Maria Renata P.; Silvius, Kirsten M. (2012-05-29), "Ecology and Concervation of the Jaguar (Panthera onca) in Iguacu National Park, Brazil", People in Nature: Wildlife Conservation in South and Central America, Columbia University Press, ISBN 978-0-231-50208-5
- Leal, Carlos Galindo; Câmara, Ibsen de Gusmão (2003), The Atlantic Forest of South America: Biodiversity Status, Threats, and Outlook, Island Press, ISBN 978-1-55963-989-7
- WWF-Brasil expands conservation efforts through a project that creates a tri-national biodiversity corridor, 29 August 2014
