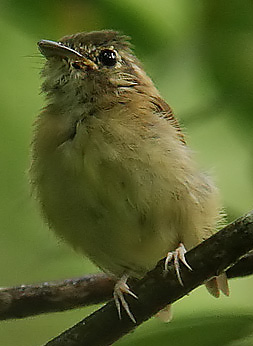

Conservation status
- Least Concern (IUCN 3.1)

Scientific classification
- Kingdom: Animalia
- Phylum: Chordata
- Class: Aves
- Order: Passeriformes
- Family: Tyrannidae
- Genus: Platyrinchus
- Species: P. cancrominus

Binomial name
- Platyrinchus cancrominus Sclater, PL & Salvin, 1860

= Stub-tailed spadebill =

Species of bird

The stub-tailed spadebill (Platyrinchus cancrominus) is a passerine bird in the Tyrannidae family. It is commonly found in tropical dry rainforests or tropical moist lowlands throughout Central America. First scientifically described in 1860, it was originally thought to be the same as Platyrinchus mystaceus but was later reclassified as a sympatric species. The stub-tailed spadebill may grow up to 9.5 cm (3.74 in) long and may weigh up to 12 g (0.42 oz). It has a white throat, yellow breast, and brown mantle and wings. The stub-tailed spadebill is most easily recognizable due to its stubby tail, broad bill, and its distinctive bird song. Some morphological differences like its greatly reduced crown differentiate it from other related species.

The stub-tailed spadebill is found in elevation ranges up to 500 m (1,640 ft) above sea level. As an omnivore it feeds on both arthropods such as spiders, beetles, and ants as well as low hanging berries and fruits in the lower strata of the rainforests. While many individuals may live in solitude, pairs that live together often nest in deep cone-shaped nests made with scavenged fibres. Stub-tailed spadebills also engage in mixed-species foraging flocks with other species commonly found in the same habitat. Engaging in this flocking behaviour is still not fully understood and is believed to be done for protection from predation. It is categorized as a species of least concern by the International Union for Conservation of Nature

== Taxonomy ==
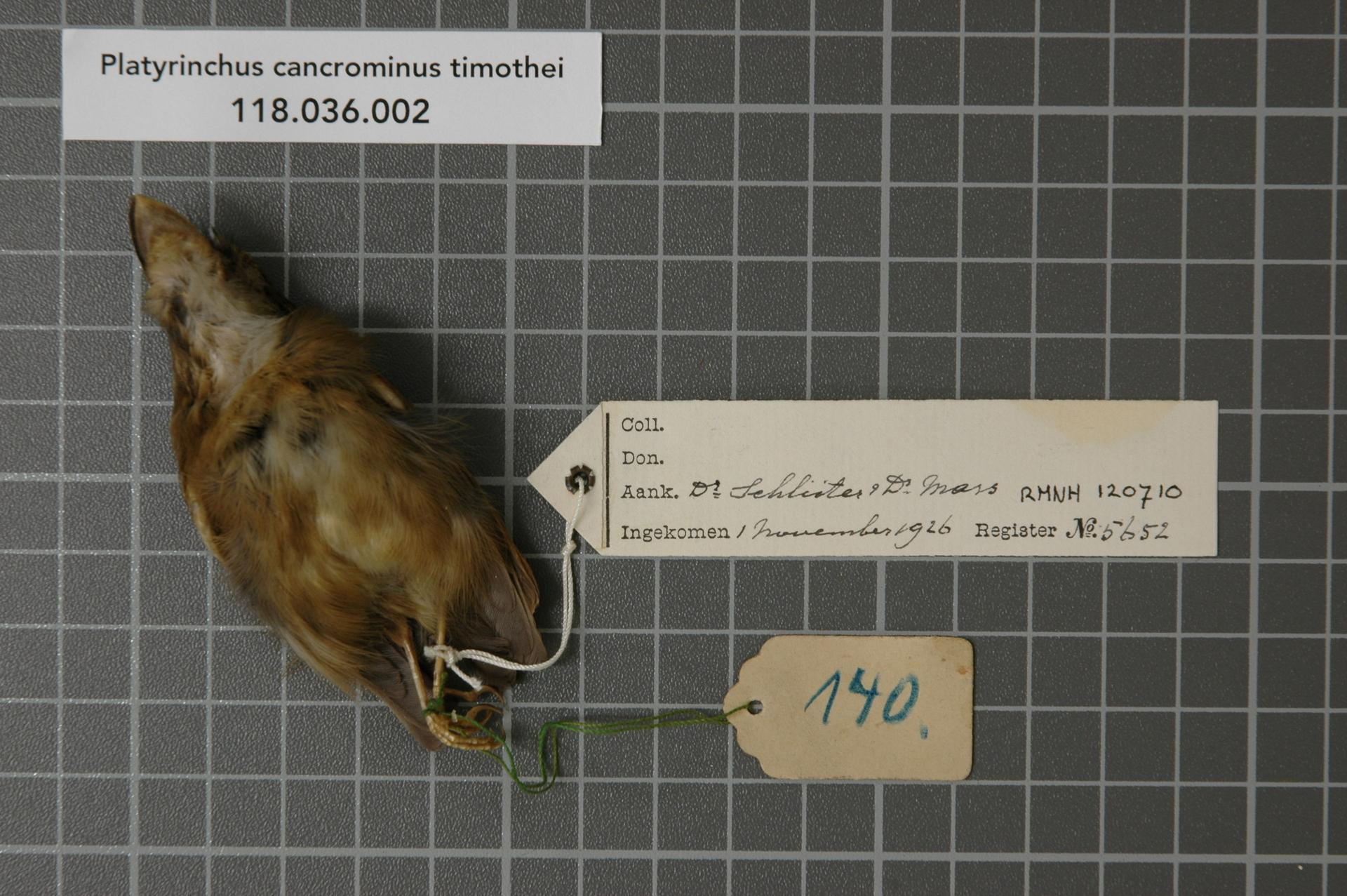
Naturalis Biodiversity Center - RMNH.AVES.120710 - Platyrinchus cancrominus timothei Paynter, 1954 - Tyrannidae - bird skin specimen

First described by Philip Lutley Sclater and Osbert Salvin in 1860, stub-tailed spadebills derive their name from their short, stub-like tails. They also have a brown, broad, and flat bill, a discerning feature of the Platyrinchus genus. When originally described it was observed to very closely related to Platyrinchus mystaceus, but was classified as a sympatric species, having a common ancestor. Populations present in some places are treated as subspecies of Platyrinchus cancrominus by some authors. Populations in the Yucatán Peninsula are treated as the race timothei while populations from El Salvador to Costa Rica are treated as the race dilutus. However, these populations are considered to be poorly differentiated and require further research for categorisation.

== Description ==
The stub-tailed spadebill can grow up to 9.5 cm (3.74 in) long and weigh up to 12 g (0.42 oz). It has brown feathering on its head extending down to the mantle as well as its wings. It has a pale-coloured mandible leading to its white throat. The abdomen usually has yellow plumage in males, but females may have brown and yellow plumage as well. The short brown tail of the species is a distinguishing feature that gives it its name. Stub-tailed spadebill have a broad and flat bill and pinkish feet. It also has a distinguishable face pattern with distinctive yellow postocular stripes.

One of the most discerning features of the species is its greatly reduced or completely absent crown. Unlike other members of the genus Platyrinchus, the stub-tailed spadebill does not have a crown, which led to it being identified as a separate species.

Due to the colouring of its plumage, it has often been quoted to be 'difficult to spot' in its natural habitat. Alongside its slender body, it is able to avoid predators with this colouring that allows it to blend in. Stub-tailed spadebills can also be easily recognized by their nasal, rapid, and shaky "ki-di-di-di-rrril" calls that they often make after taking short flights.

The stub-tailed spadebill's diet consists mainly of arthropods, such as homopteran bugs, ants, beetles, and spiders.

== Distribution and habitat ==
Stub-tailed spadebills are commonly observed in tropical dry forests and subtropical moist forests ranging from southern Mexico to parts of Belize, Guatemala, Honduras, Nicaragua, and Costa Rica, covering about 1,090,000 km^{2} of land. The habitat of the stub-tailed spadebills stretches over a large range of Central America and has intersections with other related species. It is known to occupy spaces within altitude limits of 0 – 1500 m above sea level. It occupies the undergrowth of the tropical forests to accommodate its food choices as well for protection from predators. Despite the lack of previous populations in the region, individuals of the species were also found to also inhabit forests in North-western Panama in recent studies showing that the species is able to disperse over a greater area than previously thought and is also able to occupy islands with new regrowth, showing dispersal over water. These populations are thought to be remnants from a time when the species had a greater range of habitat.

The current population is estimated to currently be around 50,000–500,000 individuals. However, a decreasing trend has been observed in the population. This decreasing trend in population is expected to be due to deforestation and fragmentation of land, resulting in the destruction of the typical humid rainforests the stub-tailed spadebills normally inhabit. But this decline is not sufficiently rapid to approach thresholds to be treated as vulnerable. As such, it is currently not considered a threatened species by the IUCN.

This species is found amongst the foliage of the rainforests with shrubs, and trees with canopies up to medium height. Some species of foliage commonly in such forests are Rubiaceae, Phyllanthaceae, hemiepiphyte, and epiphytes. This kind of undergrowth gives the stub-tailed spadebills the ability to perch directly above prey hidden in the foliage.

== Behaviour, ecology and breeding ==
The stub-tailed spadebill may be found alone or in pairs. It will look around for food in the undergrowth it inhabits. It feeds on fruits, seeds, and insects such as ants and beetles. As it occupies the lower levels of the rainforest, it feeds on the small drupes and berries growing at this level. The stub-tailed spadebill also benefits from its habitat amongst the undergrowth of the tropical rainforests as it is able to scavenge dead grass and plant fibers for nesting. During the breeding season, individuals of the species in Costa Rica have been seen to scavenge grasses and plant fibres to make deep, cone-shaped cup nests. These nests are often placed in low saplings around the scavenging sites. Despite having access to a variety of different food sources, it is also seen that some individuals may exclusively feed only on plants. It may also change its preferences between fruits and seeds depending on the abundance of either.

Stub-tailed spadebills are also commonly involved in mixed-species feeding flocks in which birds of different species forage together. This behaviour may be taken to reduce the risk of predation due to increased vigilance. Stub-tailed spadebills mainly forage alongside species like tanagers, flycatchers, and warblers. The stub-tailed spadebill is able to sustain and forage for food in its trophic niche despite the presence of other competing species due to this flocking behaviour as individuals from all species collectively hunt.
