= San Pedro, Misiones =

San Pedro (Misiones)
- Municipality and village
- Location within Misiones Province Location within Argentina
- Country: Argentina
- Province: Misiones Province
- Time zone: UTC−3 (ART)

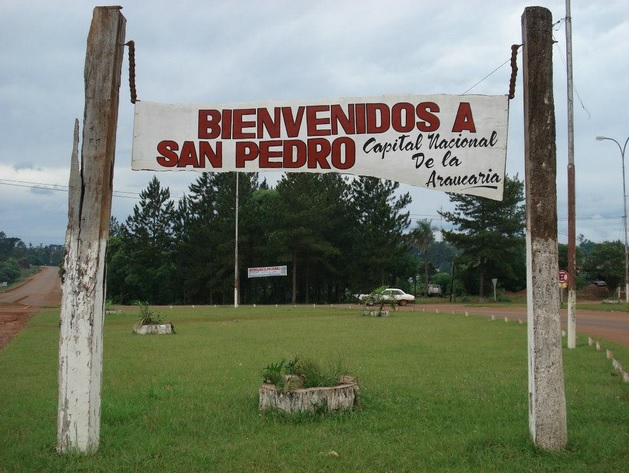
Entrance sign to San Pedro, Misiones Province, Argentina.

San Pedro (Misiones) is a village and municipality in Misiones Province in north-eastern Argentina.

The department contains the 31,619 hectares (78,130 acres) Esmeralda Provincial Park, created in 1997.

Argentine-Armenian footballer, Tomás Adoryán was born in San Pedro.
