= Rufous-bellied bolo mouse =

Conservation status
- Least Concern (IUCN 3.1)

Scientific classification
- Kingdom: Animalia
- Phylum: Chordata
- Class: Mammalia
- Order: Rodentia
- Family: Cricetidae
- Subfamily: Sigmodontinae
- Genus: Necromys
- Species: N. lactens

Binomial name
- Necromys lactens (Thomas, 1918)

Species of rodent

The rufous-bellied bolo mouse or white-chinned akodont, (Necromys lactens) is a species of rodent in the family Cricetidae. It is found in Argentina and Bolivia where it inhabits the dry valleys of the eastern Andes. Its conservation status is listed by the International Union for Conservation of Nature as being of "least concern".

== Description ==
The rufous-bellied bolo mouse reaches a head-and-body length of 98 to 124 mm (3.9 to 4.9 in) with a tail of 57 to 77 mm (2.2 to 3.0 in). The head and back are a buffy-brown with fine streaks of black. The flanks are more richly coloured, reddish-brown or cinnamon, and the underparts are a variable shade of cinnamon. The ears are well-haired and there is nearly always a white spot on the chin or throat. The tail is two-coloured, blackish brown above and whitish or buff below. The claws are long and are concealed in tufts of white hair.

== Distribution and habitat ==
The rufous-bellied bolo mouse is native to the eastern slopes of the Andes in central and southern Bolivia and northern Argentina. Its typical habitat is puna grassland in dry valleys. In Bolivia it occurs between about 2,000 and 4,000 m (6,600 and 13,100 ft), and in Argentina, between about 1,500 and 3,100 m (4,900 and 10,200 ft).

== Status ==
The rufous-bellied bolo mouse is a common species in appropriate habitat in its wide range. It is tolerant of some degree of habitat modification, with some of the puna grassland being increasingly used for cattle grazing, but it does not adapt to living in cropland. The International Union for Conservation of Nature has assessed its conservation status as being of "least concern", believing that any population decline is not sufficiently rapid as to warrant putting it in a more threatened category.
