= Aristóbulo del Valle, Misiones =

Aristóbulo del Valle (Misiones)
- Village
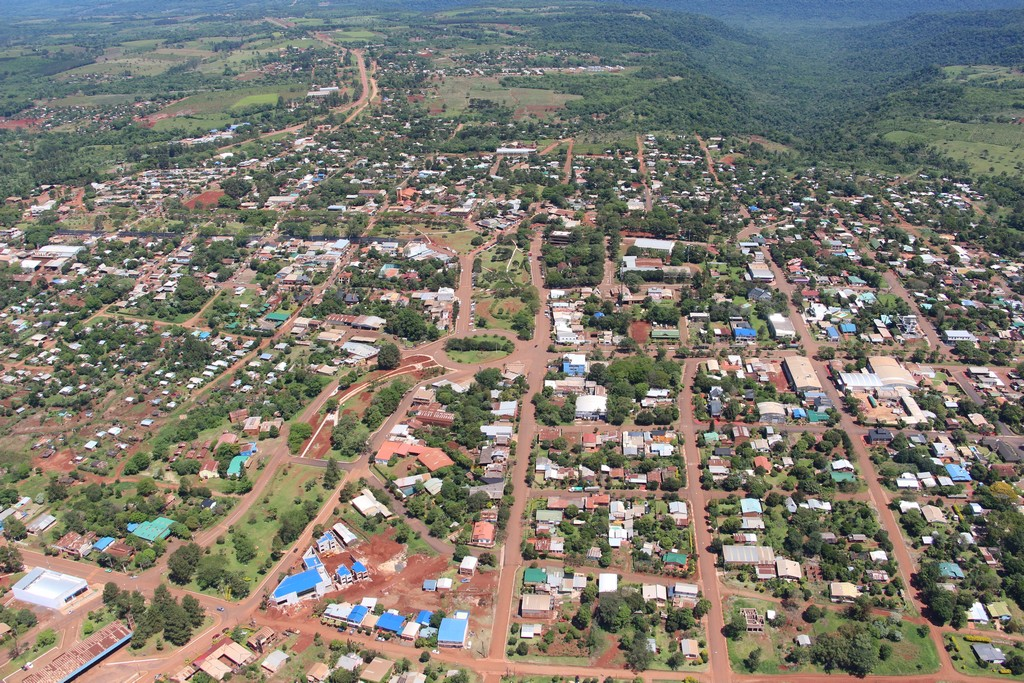

- Location within Misiones Province Location within Argentina
- Country: Argentina
- Province: Misiones

Government
  - Intendant: Juan José Mac Donald

Population
  - Total: 20,683
- Time zone: UTC−3 (ART)

Aristóbulo del Valle (Misiones) is a village and municipality in Misiones Province in north-eastern Argentina.

The municipality contains part of the Valle del Arroyo Cuña-Pirú Reserve, created in 2000.
