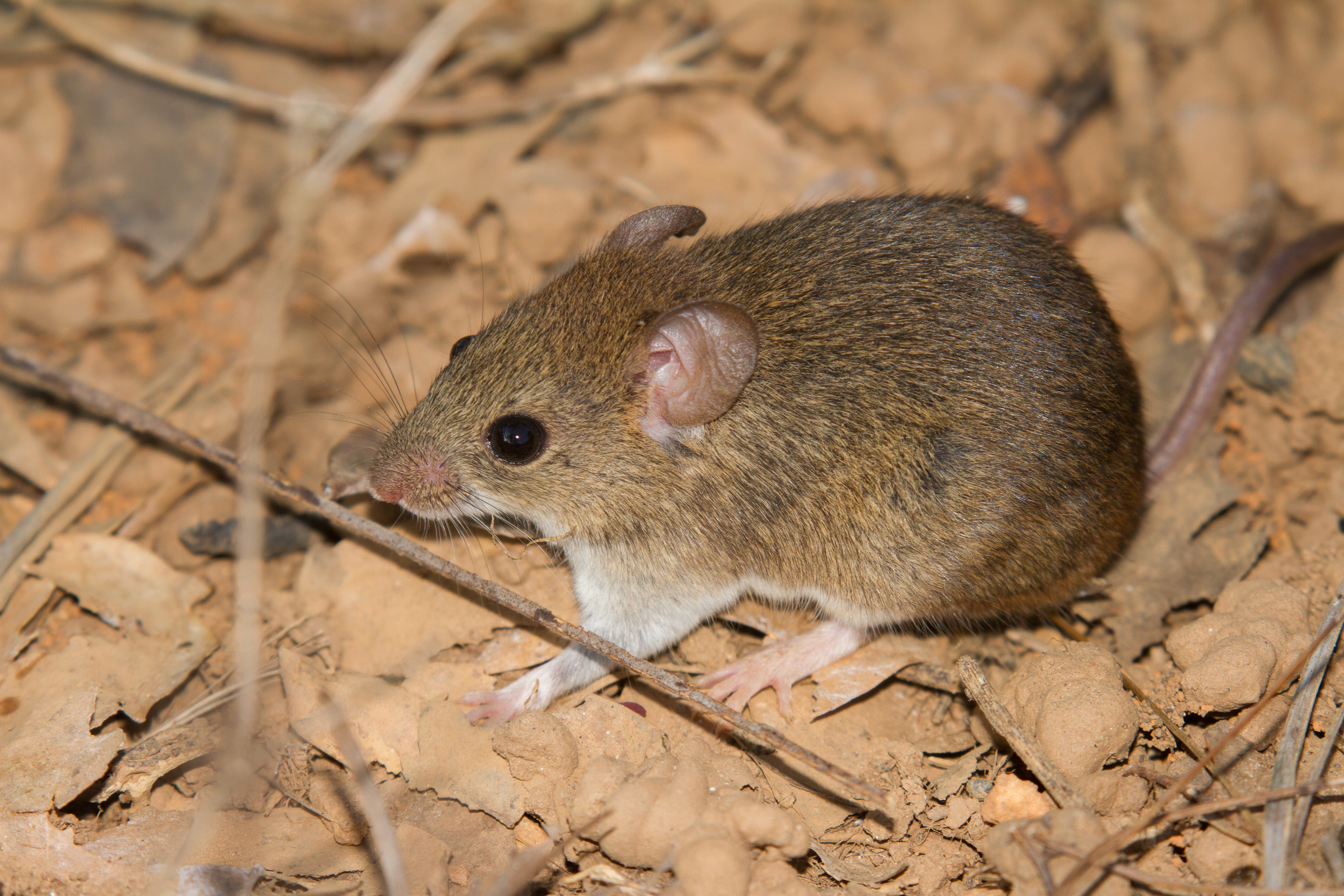
- Hairy-tailed bolo mouse (Necromys lasiurus)

Scientific classification
- Domain: Eukaryota
- Kingdom: Animalia
- Phylum: Chordata
- Class: Mammalia
- Order: Rodentia
- Family: Cricetidae
- Subfamily: Sigmodontinae
- Tribe: Akodontini
- Genus: Necromys; Ameghino, 1889

Type species
- Necromys conifer

Species
- N. amoenus; N. benefactus; N. lactens; N. lasiurus; N. lenguarum; N. obscurus; N. punctulatus; N. temchuki; N. urichi; †N. bonapartai

Synonyms
- Bolomys Thomas 1916; Cabreramys Massoia & Fornes 1967

= Necromys =

Necromys Temporal range: Late Pliocene–Recent

Genus of rodents

Necromys is a genus of South American sigmodontine rodents allied to Akodon. This genus has also been known as Cabreramys or more recently Bolomys, and the northern grass mouse (N. urichi) has recently been transferred from Akodon.

== History ==
Most of the Brazilian members of the genus Necromys were first described in the second half of the nineteenth century, and the species from the Andes followed in the first decades of the twentieth century. Small rodents in South America were studied by the British zoologist Oldfield Thomas, curator at the Natural History Museum, London who erected the genus Bolomys in 1916.

== Characteristics ==
Members of the genus Necromys are spread out over a wide area of Central and South America. Morphologically, members of the genus are difficult to distinguish from two other genera found in the same region, the grass mice Akodon and the cane mice Zygodontomys. In 1987, the Argentine zoologist Osvaldo Reig listed the characteristics that distinguished the genus Bolomys from Akodon as; the braincase is broad and deep; the occipital region is short; the rostrum is fairly short; the rostrum tapers forwards when viewed from the side; the occiput is short and truncated; the zygomatic plate is broad, with the front edge straight or slightly concave; the upper incisors are orthodont or proodont; the molars are mesodont, broad and robust; the upper molars have transverse loops; and the lower molars have the lingual cusps slightly in front of the labial cusps.

There is very little variation in the karyotype of Necromys, where 2n=34 is the rule, with N. lactens and N. lasiurus having diploid numbers of 2n=36. This is in great contrast to the explosively radiating Akodon which has diploid numbers ranging from 2n=14 to 2n=52.

== Species ==
Species listed in Necromys include:

- N. amoenus Pleasant bolo mouse
- N. benefactus Argentine bolo mouse
- N. lactens Rufous-bellied bolo mouse
- N. lasiurus Hairy-tailed bolo mouse
- N. lenguarum Paraguayan bolo mouse
- N. lilloi
- N. obscurus Dark bolo mouse
- N. punctulatus Spotted bolo mouse
- N. temchuki Temchuk's bolo mouse
- N. urichi Northern grass mouse
- †N. bonapartei, Monte Hermoso Formation (Montehermosan)
