= Ruiz de Montoya =

- Municipality and village
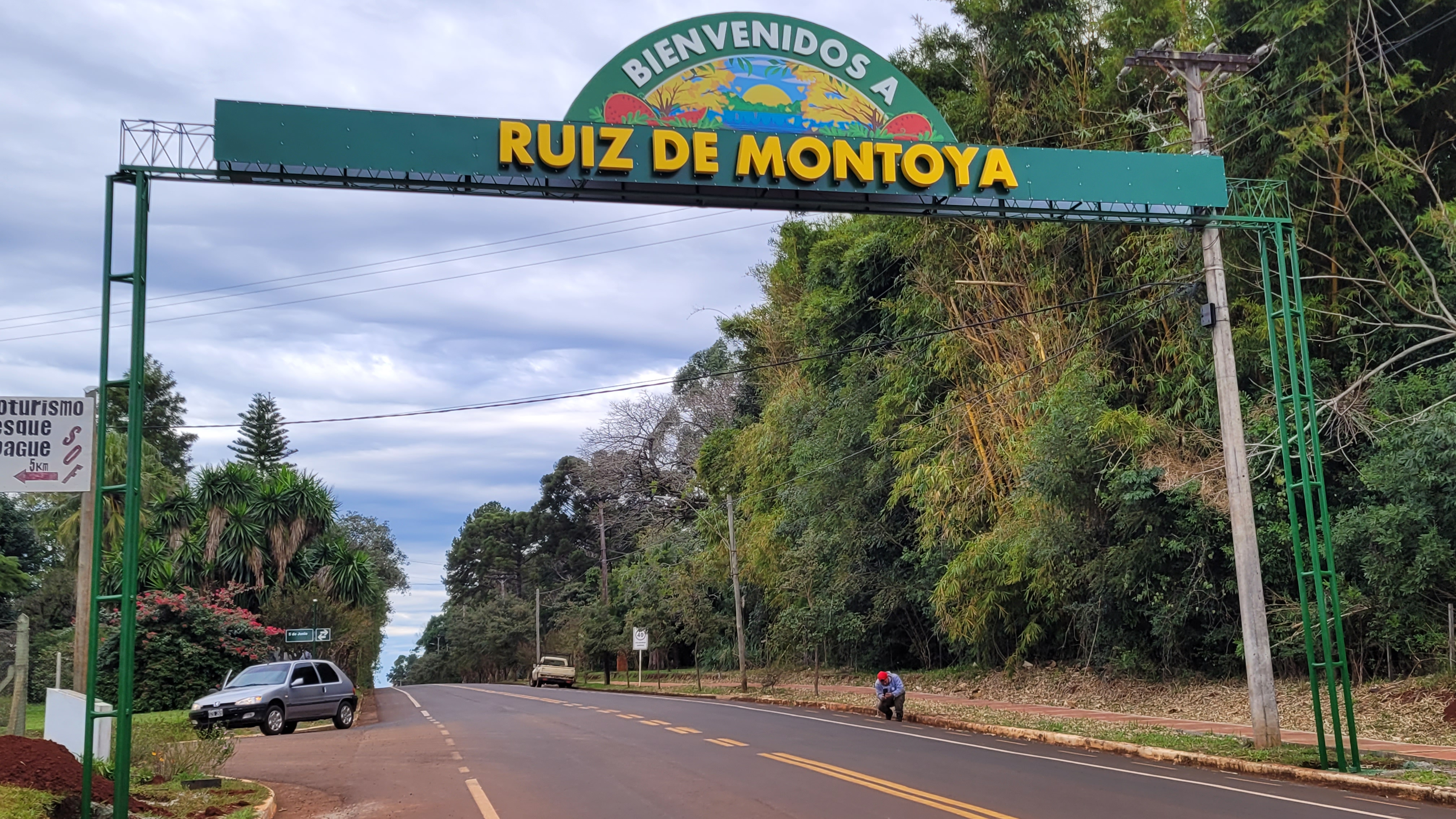

- Location of Ruiz de Montoya Ruiz de Montoya (Argentina)
- Coordinates: 26°58′07″S 55°03′27″W
- Country: Argentina
- Province: Misiones Province

Government
  - Intendant: Víctor Vogel

Area
  - Total: 50 sq mi (130 km^{2})

Population (2001)
  - Total: 3,374
  - Density: 67/sq mi (26/km^{2})
- Time zone: UTC−3 (ART)

Ruiz de Montoya is a village and municipality in Misiones Province in north-eastern Argentina.

The municipality contains part of the Valle del Arroyo Cuña-Pirú Reserve, created in 2000.
