= Esmeralda Provincial Park =

Provincial park in Misiones province, Argentina

- Parque Provincial Esmeralda
- IUCN category II (national park)
- Location within Argentina
- Nearest city: San Pedro, Misiones
- Coordinates: 26.833333°S 54.033333°W
- Area: 31,619 hectares (78,130 acres)
- Designation: Provincial park
- Created: 1997

The Esmeralda Provincial Park (Spanish: Parque Provincial Esmeralda) is a provincial park in the Misiones Province of Argentina.

== Location ==
The Esmeralda Provincial Park is in the department of San Pedro, Misiones. It has an area of 31,619 hectares (78,130 acres). The park is in the Alto Paraná Atlantic forests ecoregion. It is the core of the Yabotí Biosphere Reserve, (Note: The Yabotí Biosphere Reserve consists of the Kaa Yarí Provincial Park, Guarani Experimental Area, Papel Misionero Natural Cultural Reserve, Moconá Provincial Park and Esmeralda Provincial Park, as well as private properties that make up the largest area of the reserve.) and protects the Arroyo Yabotí basin. It has rugged terrain with abundant forest. The park contains the Marcio Ayres Biological Station, which is used by scientists studying biodiversity.

== History ==
The area was established as the Obraje Esmeralda Protected Nature Area by provincial law 2,939 of 1992. It was made a provincial park by law 3.469 on 1997. The park would be part of the proposed Trinational Biodiversity Corridor, which aims to provide forest connections between conservation units in Brazil, Paraguay and Argentina in the Upper Paraná ecoregion.

== Sources ==
- Araújo Corte, Dione Angélica de; Valladares-Pádua, Cláudio Benedito (November 2007), Plano de Manejo da Estação Ecológica Mico-Leão-Preto (PDF) (in Portuguese), Brasília: ICMBio, archived from the original (PDF) on 2016-11-07
- Parque Provincial Esmeralda-R.B.Yaboty (in Spanish), SIB: Administración de Parques Nacionales, archived from the original on 2016-08-21
- "Parque Provincial Esmeralda", Ruta de la Selva (in Spanish)
- San Pedro (in Spanish), Acampante.com » Campings en Argentina
- Turismo ecológico Misiones San Pedro (in Spanish), CFI: Consejo Federal de Inversiones, archived from the original on 2016-09-14
