= Temchuk's bolo mouse =

Conservation status
- Least Concern (IUCN 3.1)

Scientific classification
- Kingdom: Animalia
- Phylum: Chordata
- Class: Mammalia
- Order: Rodentia
- Family: Cricetidae
- Subfamily: Sigmodontinae
- Genus: Necromys
- Species: N. temchuki

Binomial name
- Necromys temchuki (Massoia, 1980)

Synonyms
- Bolomys temchuki (Massoia, 1980)

Species of rodent

Temchuk's bolo mouse (Necromys temchuki) is a species of rodent in the family Cricetidae. It is found only in Argentina.
