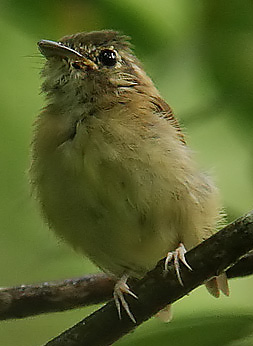
- Stub-tailed Spadebill (Platyrinchus cancrominus)

Scientific classification
- Kingdom: Animalia
- Phylum: Chordata
- Class: Aves
- Order: Passeriformes
- Family: Tyrannidae
- Genus: Platyrinchus; Desmarest, 1805

Type species
- Platyrinchus fuscus = Todus platyrhynchos Desmarest, 1805

= Spadebill =

Genus of birds

Spadebills are birds of the genus Platyrinchus, from Ancient Greek πλατύς (platús), meaning "flat", and ῥύγχος (rhúnkhos), meaning "bill", in the tyrant flycatcher family Tyrannidae. They live in Central and South America and have broad, flat, triangular bills.

The genus was erected by the French zoologist Anselme Gaëtan Desmarest in 1805 with the white-crested spadebill (Platyrinchus platyrhynchos) as the type species.

== Species ==
The genus contains seven species:

Image	Scientific name	Common name	Distribution
	Cinnamon-crested spadebill	Platyrinchus saturatus	Brazil, Colombia, Ecuador, French Guiana, Guyana, Peru, Suriname, and Venezuela
	Stub-tailed spadebill	Platyrinchus cancrominus	El Salvador to Costa Rica
	Yellow-throated spadebill	Platyrinchus flavigularis	Colombia, Ecuador, Peru, and Venezuela
	Golden-crowned spadebill	Platyrinchus coronatus	Bolivia, Brazil, Colombia, Costa Rica, Ecuador, French Guiana, Guyana, Honduras, Nicaragua, Panama, Peru, Suriname, and Venezuela
	White-throated spadebill	Platyrinchus mystaceus	from Costa Rica through South America to western Ecuador, Brazil, and northeastern Argentina
	White-crested spadebill	Platyrinchus platyrhynchos	Bolivia, Brazil, Colombia, Ecuador, French Guiana, Guyana, Peru, Suriname, and Venezuela
	Russet-winged spadebill	Platyrinchus leucoryphus	Argentina, Brazil, and Paraguay
