= El Soberbio =

- Municipality and village
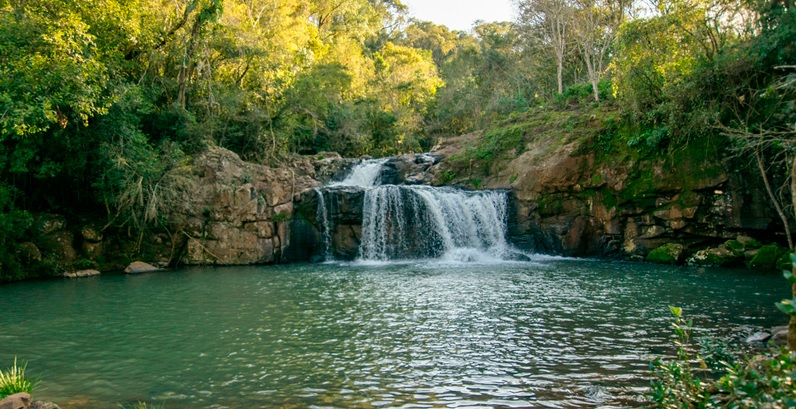

- Location within Misiones Province Location within Argentina
- Coordinates: 27°17′43″S 54°11′54″W
- Country: Argentina
- Province: Misiones Province

Government
  - Intendant: Ricardo Leiva
- Elevation: 604 ft (184 m)
- Time zone: UTC−3 (ART)
- Postal code: 3364
- Area code: 3755

El Soberbio is a village and municipality in Misiones Province in northeastern Argentina. It contains the 25,690 hectares (63,500 acres) Papel Misionero Natural Cultural Reserve, created in 1994.

== Place name ==
The village's name, meaning "the proud", arises from a phrase in one of the first person to reach the mouth of the creek Guarambocá, "What a magnificent place!"

== Population ==
The population at roughly 20,000 inhabitants, according to the latest census INDEC 2001. It is 80% rural and urban area with a radius of 6 km, which gives a dispersion of most of the territory. As a young population also has a high birth rate, by which the average family has more than three members. In urban areas are most public and private services, and even today is still difficult for rural people to access them.

The difficulty of communication, cultural heritage and strong media presence (radio and TV) of the neighboring country Brazil, make a very particular cultural trend where from simple portuñol in elementary schools to trade (legal and illegal) make that the borders are solamennte formalities.

According to the population of the province, across the eastern fringe is characterized by the presence of European immigrants afuerte, corresponding to the decade of 1820 onwards. Predominantly German and Polish, but there are also many other parts of Europe, which constitute a minority. This population admitted to a greater extent in Brazil through a private settlement program is mixed with the existing population, is low because only the mills pawn mate wild wood and the fate of these was varied, but mensu many were already in other areas of the province (central and Parana) where the river Uruguay's main means of communication to urban centers, and from which goods were transported in "flat" drawn wooden boats.

The current population is also composed when in the early s. XX, settled some jangaderos come from Brazil, who were responsible for downstream maneuver large log rafts called "rafts."

Some of these jangaderos and other colonized people of character, as the first colonizer Don Arturo Henn and the first teacher Fenocchio were the ones who over the years were to build this new venture and founded the town in 1946.

As of 2001, El Soberbio had a population of 3,732 (a density of 26.2 people per km^{2}).

Intercensal Change + 64.0% (1991, 2001)
Type of municipality municipality of category 1
Municipality population 19,571 (2001)

== Geography ==
Located along the Uruguay River and bordered by the small Brazilian town of Porto Soberbo, El Soberbio has a population of 19,571 inhabitants.

== Organization ==
It was the third town in the province of Misiones in creating its charter, even before the capital. [1]

The presence of some essential areas planted with grass, and the subsequent extraction of the essences of them, turned the town into the National Capital Essences.

You can reach The Proud and the Provincial Route 13 (50 km), that the community north to San Vicente, and provincial route No. 2, which connects the Southwest with Colonia Aurora and San Javier, and north to Moconá Falls. The completion of the asphalt to this natural attraction is expected to boost the position of the town as a tourist destination.

== Economy ==
The main sources of employment were generated by agricultural production, mostly a monoculture of state policy-driven product (herb, tea, tung, aromatic essences) that though they may coexist, provided they were replaced chronologically by economic benefits, escaped this If the logging of native forest that even today is one of the greatest activities.

In the past 10 years there was a substantial growth in the economy, especially for agricultural producers are smallholders, like the rest of the province is divided in various productions and the other portion in particular landowners for reforestation.

So widespread is the logging of hardwood, then the saturation of the ground is made of pine plantation or snuff. The latter is the most mobilized the strong economic growth, reflected in the population increased purchasing power in rural areas and greater impact on factors such as provincial policy, this string to change the direction of the regional economy to try out activities less polluting and low-impact tourism, and the realization of a route to Mocona, which should be a double benefit for locals.
