= Northern grass mouse =

Conservation status
- Least Concern (IUCN 3.1)

Scientific classification
- Kingdom: Animalia
- Phylum: Chordata
- Class: Mammalia
- Order: Rodentia
- Family: Cricetidae
- Subfamily: Sigmodontinae
- Genus: Necromys
- Species: N. urichi

Binomial name
- Necromys urichi (J. A. Allen & Chapman, 1897)

Synonyms
- Akodon urichi; N. chapmani (J. A. Allen, 1913); N. meridensis (J. A. Allen, 1904); N. saturatus (Tate, 1939); N. tobagensis (Goodwin, 1962); N. venezuelensis (J. A. Allen, 1899)

Species of rodent

The northern grass mouse, or northern akodont, (Necromys urichi) is a species of rodent in the family Cricetidae. It is found in Brazil, Colombia, Venezuela and Trinidad and Tobago.

== Description ==
The northern grass mouse is a medium-sized species. The fur on the upper parts of the body is a dark chestnut grizzled with black. The underparts are paler, with the hairs having dark bases and yellowish or pale grey tips. There is a bare ring of skin round the eye and there are usually grey-tipped hairs on the chin and throat. The ears are sparsely covered with rusty brown hairs. The tail is a uniform dark brown with a scattering of hairs and no tuft at the tip. The upper surfaces of the feet have dark ochre fur and there are tufts of hair by the nails. The first and fifth digits of the hind feet are much shorter than the other three.

== Distribution ==
The northern grass mouse is found in Trinidad and Tobago and in the mountains of northern and southern Venezuela, eastern Colombia and northern Brazil. Its altitudinal range is from 240 to 2,232 m (790 to 7,320 ft). It is a terrestrial species usually found in evergreen and deciduous forests but sometimes in savannah. It favours moist areas near streams with rocks and scrubby vegetation.

== Ecology ==
The northern grass mouse is active both day and night. The diet consists of green plant material and seeds. Females reach sexual maturity at 2.7 months and breeding takes place throughout the year with a peak in May and June. The average litter size is five and there are three or four litters per year.

== Status ==
The northern grass mouse has a wide range but is generally uncommon. It is likely that it is a species complex and that further research will subdivide the species as now known into several new species. In that event, the conservation status of some populations may be threatened, but for the time being, the International Union for Conservation of Nature has assessed this mouse as being of "least concern".
