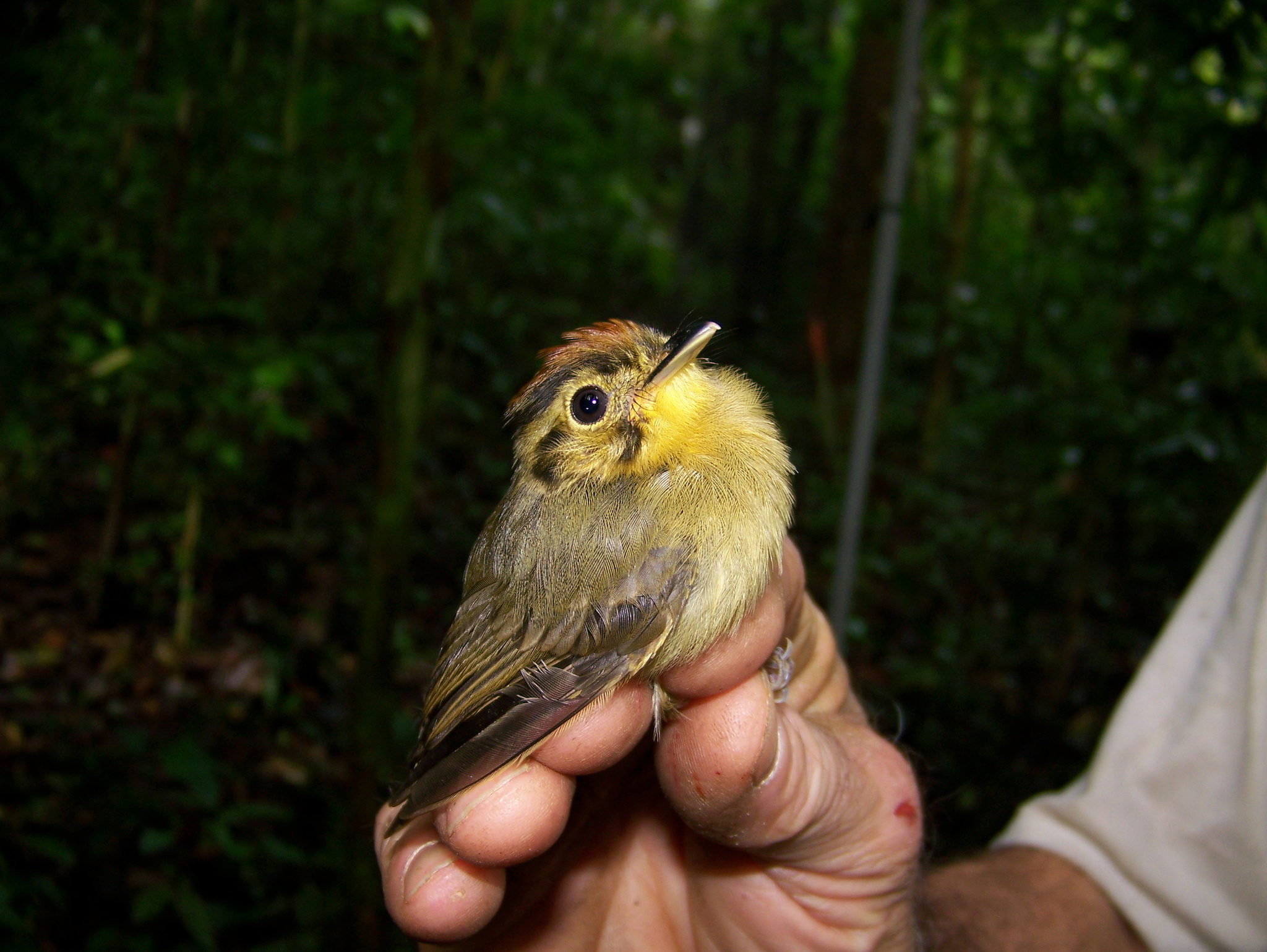

Conservation status
- Least Concern (IUCN 3.1)

Scientific classification
- Kingdom: Animalia
- Phylum: Chordata
- Class: Aves
- Order: Passeriformes
- Family: Tyrannidae
- Genus: Platyrinchus
- Species: P. coronatus

Binomial name
- Platyrinchus coronatus Sclater, PL, 1858

= Golden-crowned spadebill =

Species of bird

The golden-crowned spadebill (Platyrinchus coronatus) is a species of bird in the family Tyrannidae, the tyrant flycatchers. It is found Central America from Honduras to Panama and in every mainland South American country except Argentina, Chile, Paraguay, and Uruguay.

== Taxonomy and systematics ==
The golden-crowned spadebill has three subspecies, the nominate P. c. coronatus (Sclater, PL, 1858), P. c. superciliaris (Lawrence, 1863), and P. c. gumia (Bangs and Penard, 1918). A study published in 2012 found deep genetic differences between the subspecies on either side of the Andes, evidence that some of them may warrant treatment as full species.

== Description ==
The golden-crowned spadebill is the smallest member of its genus. It is about 8.5 to 9 cm (3.3 to 3.5 in) long and weighs 8 to 9 g (0.28 to 0.32 oz). It has a large head with a bold facial pattern and a stubby tail. The sexes have almost the same plumage. Males of the nominate subspecies have a black crown with a partially hidden orange-rufous patch in the center; females have a purer orange patch. Both sexes have pale buff-yellow as a patch above the lores, as an eye-ring, as a stripe behind the eye, and as a patch on the ear coverts. Their lores are blackish brown that continues as a stripe through and beneath the eye and around the ear coverts. The rest of their head and their upperparts, wings, and tail are olive. Their throat is pale whitish yellow and their underparts mostly pale yellow. Their breast has an olive wash or streaks. Juveniles do not have the colorful crown patch; they have paler facial markings and underparts than adults with grayish olive upperparts and ochraceous edges of the wing coverts and flight feathers. Subspecies P. c. superciliaris has brighter yellow underparts than the nominate and P. c. gumia has a brighter yellow belly. All subspecies have a dark iris, a wide flat bill with a black maxilla and a pale yellow mandible, and pale pinkish legs and feet.

== Distribution and habitat ==
The golden-crowned spadebill has a disjunct distribution with the Andes separating one subspecies from the others. Subspecies P. c. superciliaris is found from northern and eastern Honduras south through Nicaragua on the Caribbean slope, through Costa Rica and Panama on the Caribbean and Pacific slopes, and thence west of the Andes through Colombia and south into northwestern Ecuador as far as northern Los Ríos Province. In Colombia its range also extends east to Santander Department. In elevation it ranges from sea level to 1,250 m (4,100 ft) in Central America though only to 600 m (2,000 ft) on the Caribbean side of Costa Rica, to 1,000 m (3,300 ft) in western Colombia, and between to 600 and 2,000 m (2,000 and 6,600 ft) in western Ecuador.

The nominate subspecies is a bird of the Amazon Basin. It is found from southern Amazonas state in southern Venezuela southwest across southeastern Colombia and south through eastern Ecuador and eastern Peru into northern Bolivia to La Paz Department. Its range extends east into Brazil to the upper Negro River north of the Amazon, and south of the Amazon east to the Xingu River and south to Mato Grosso. P. c. gumia is found from central and eastern Bolívar state in southeastern Venezuela east through the Guianas and northern Brazil to the Atlantic in Amapá. In elevation the subspecies reach 1,500 m (4,900 ft) in Venezuela, to 1,000 m (3,300 ft) in eastern Colombia, between 1,000 and 2,000 m (3,300 and 6,600 ft) in eastern Ecuador, and mostly to 1,000 m (3,300 ft) but locally higher in Brazil.

The golden-crowned spadebill is found in the tropical and lower subtropical zones of lowlands and foothills. It inhabits the understory of humid primary and mature secondary forest both várzea and terra firme.

== Behavior ==
=== Movement ===
The golden-crowned spadebill is a year-round resident.

=== Feeding ===
The golden-crowned spadebill feeds on arthropods. It typically forages singly, in pairs, or in small family groups. It frequently joins mixed-species feeding flocks and only rarely attends army ant swarms. It feeds mostly in shady but somewhat open forest understory. It sits still, typically about 1 to 5 m (3 to 16 ft) above the ground, and captures prey mostly with short upward sallies from the perch to grab it from the underside of leaves and twigs.

=== Breeding ===
The golden-crowned spadebill's breeding season varies geographically. It spans from April to June in Costa Rica and January to April in northwestern Colombia. It includes July in Panama and August in southeastern Colombia. Males make short display flights during which their wings whirr. The species' nest is a cup made from plant fibers and fungal rhizomorphs bound with spider web and lined with finer fibers. Its outside is often "decorated" with moss and spider egg cases and resembles a hummingbird nest. It sometimes has material straggling from its bottom. It is typically placed 1 to 4 m (3 to 13 ft) above the ground in an upright fork of a shrub or small tree. The clutch is two eggs. The incubation period is about 20 or 21 days. The time to fledging and details of parental care are not known.

=== Vocalization ===
The golden-crowned spadebill's song has been described as "a very high-pitched, rapid, hissing trill that undulates slightly...and could easily be mistaken for an insect noise". A similar description is "a weak, insectlike, and high-pitched trill, se'e'e'e'e'e'e'r'r'r'r'e'e'ep...barely audible at any distance and easily overlooked".

== Status ==
The IUCN has assessed the golden-crowned spadebill as being of Least Concern. It has a very large range; its population size is not known and is believed to be decreasing. No immediate threats have been identified. It is considered generally uncommon to fairly common or locally common and "probably often overlooked". It is considered fairly common in Costa Rica and Venezuela, uncommon in Colombia, and "widespread...but relatively uncommon" in Peru. It is found in many protected areas both public and private across its range. It is "[p]robably locally extinct wherever deforestation has been intense [but] much suitable habitat remains in relatively good condition within its large range".
