= Argentine bolo mouse =

Conservation status
- Least Concern (IUCN 3.1)

Scientific classification
- Kingdom: Animalia
- Phylum: Chordata
- Class: Mammalia
- Order: Rodentia
- Family: Cricetidae
- Subfamily: Sigmodontinae
- Genus: Necromys
- Species: N. benefactus

Binomial name
- Necromys benefactus (Thomas, 1919)

Species of rodent

The Argentine bolo mouse (Necromys benefactus) is a species of rodent in the family Cricetidae. It is endemic to central Argentina, where it is found in the pampas and the drier espinal (lowland thorn brush).
