= Pleasant bolo mouse =

Conservation status
- Least Concern (IUCN 3.1)

Scientific classification
- Kingdom: Animalia
- Phylum: Chordata
- Class: Mammalia
- Order: Rodentia
- Family: Cricetidae
- Subfamily: Sigmodontinae
- Genus: Necromys
- Species: N. amoenus

Binomial name
- Necromys amoenus (Thomas, 1900)

Species of rodent

The pleasant bolo mouse, or pleasant akodont, (Necromys amoenus) is a species of rodent in the family Cricetidae. It is found on grassland at high altitudes in Bolivia and Peru.

== Description ==
The pleasant bolo mouse is a small member of its genus with a head-and-body length of between 95 and 103 mm (3.7 and 4.1 in) and a tail of 63 and 79 mm (2.5 and 3.1 in). The back and upper parts have yellowish-brown fur intermixed with some black hairs. The muzzle, cheeks and sides of the body are yellowish-buff, and the underparts are whitish. There is often a clear demarcation between the different regions, and the belly contrasts strongly with the upper regions. The whiskers are short, the ears rounded and well-furred and the tail is blackish-brown or ochre-brown above, and white below. The paws are covered with ochre-brown hairs above and the nails are concealed in bushy tufts of hair.

== Distribution and habitat ==
The pleasant bolo mouse is found in the Andean Plateau of west-central South America, in western Bolivia and southeastern Peru. It is present in the altiplano grasslands at altitudes between about 3,200 and 4,300 m (10,500 and 14,100 ft). It is also reported from the eastern side of the Andes on slopes in Salta Province, Argentina. It can be found near rocky outcrops and in sparsely-grassed area with scattered rocks, particularly in areas where the Peruvian feathergrass (Jarava ichu) and Parastrephia lepidophylla predominate. It is also found in Polylepis woodland and cultivated areas in Bolivia and seems tolerant of disturbance to its habitat.

== Ecology ==
The pleasant bolo mouse is diurnal and seems to feed mostly on insects.
