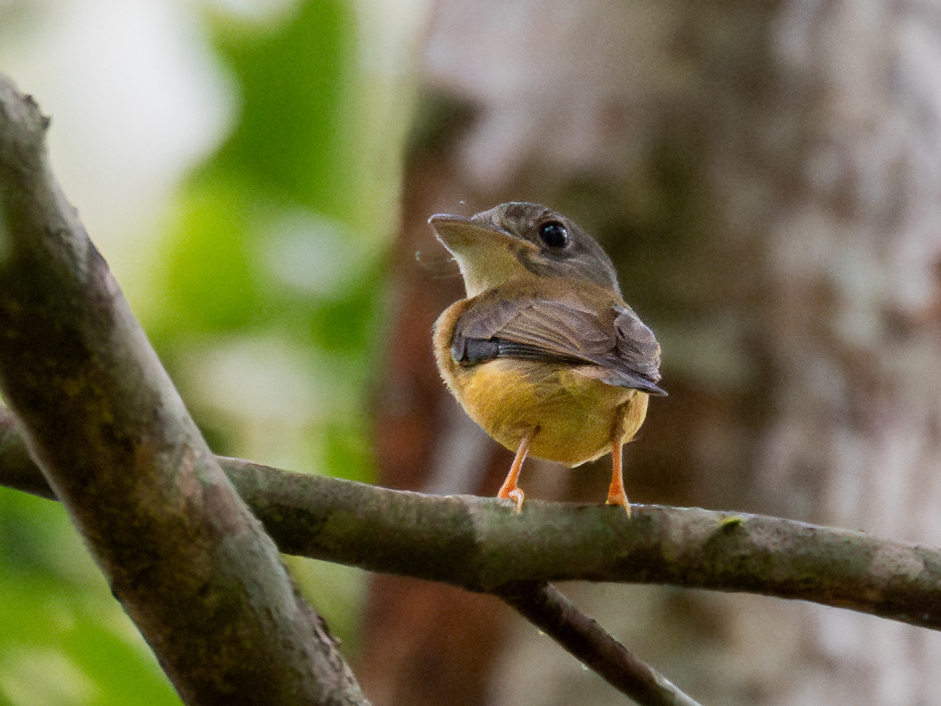

Conservation status
- Least Concern (IUCN 3.1)

Scientific classification
- Kingdom: Animalia
- Phylum: Chordata
- Class: Aves
- Order: Passeriformes
- Family: Tyrannidae
- Genus: Platyrinchus
- Species: P. platyrhynchos

Binomial name
- Platyrinchus platyrhynchos (Gmelin, JF, 1788)

= White-crested spadebill =

Species of bird

The white-crested spadebill (Platyrinchus platyrhynchos) is a species of passerine bird in the tyrant flycatcher family Tyrannidae. It is found in Bolivia, Brazil, Colombia, Ecuador, French Guiana, Guyana, Peru, Suriname, and Venezuela.

== Taxonomy and systematics ==
The white-crested spadebill was formally described in 1788 by the German naturalist Johann Friedrich Gmelin in his revised and expanded edition of Carl Linnaeus's Systema Naturae. He placed it with the todies in the genus Todus and coined the binomial name Todus platyrhynchos. The specific epithet is from Ancient Greek platurrhunkhos meaning "broad-billed" or "broad-beaked" (from platus meaning "broad" or "wide" and rhunkhos meaning "bill"). Gmelin based his description on the "Todi Leucocephali" that had been described and illustrated in 1769 by the German naturalist Peter Simon Pallas. Pallas did not specify a locality but this was subsequently designated as Suriname. The white-crested spadebill is now one of seven spadebills placed in the genus Platyrinchus that was introduced in 1805 by Anselme Gaëtan Desmarest.

The white-crested spadebill has these four subspecies:

- P. p. platyrhynchos (Gmelin, JF, 1788)
- P. p. senex Sclater, PL & Salvin, 1880
- P. p. nattereri Hartert, EJO & Hellmayr, 1902
- P. p. amazonicus Berlepsch, 1912

== Description ==
The white-crested spadebill is 10.5 to 12 cm (4.1 to 4.7 in) long and weighs 11.5 to 13 g (0.41 to 0.46 oz). It has a large head and a stubby tail; its bill is the widest of all Platyrinchus spadebills. The sexes have almost the same plumage. Adult males of the nominate subspecies P. p. platyrhynchos have a mostly gray head with a darker crown, a partially hidden white patch in the center of the crown, and a pale buffy spot above the lores. Females have a smaller white patch than males. Both sexes' upperparts are russet-brown and their wings and tail are dusky brown. Their throat is white and their underparts bright ochraceous. Subspecies P. p. senex has a paler crown and lighter and less rich upperparts than the nominate. P. p. nattereri has a slightly paler and yellower belly than the nominate. P. p. amazonicus has less bright underparts than the nominate; the ochraceous color is limited to the breast and the belly is much paler and yellower. All subspecies have a dark iris, a very wide flat bill with a black maxilla and a pale mandible, and pinkish yellow legs and feet.

== Distribution and habitat ==
The subspecies of the white-crested spadebill are found thus:

- P. p. platyrhynchos: from Vichada, Guainía, and Vaupés departments in eastern Colombia east through much of southern Venezuela, the Guianas, and northern Brazil north of the Amazon to the Branco River and northern Pará
- P. p. senex: eastern Ecuador south through eastern Peru into the northern half of Bolivia and east to the Juruá River in extreme western Brazil
- P. p. nattereri: south-central Brazil south of the Amazon between the lower Purus River and the upper Madeira and Jiparaná rivers
- P. p. amazonicus: eastern Amazonian Brazil south of the Amazon from the Tapajós River east to northern Maranhão

The white-crested spadebill inhabits the understory of humid terra firme forest, especially those on sandy soils. In elevation it ranges between sea level and 500 m (1,600 ft) in Brazil and reaches 300 m (1,000 ft) in Colombia and Ecuador and 1,100 m (3,600 ft) in Peru.

== Behavior ==
=== Movement ===
The white-crested spadebill is a year-round resident.

=== Feeding ===
The white-crested spadebill feeds on arthropods. It typically forages in pairs and briefly joins mixed-species feeding flocks but does not follow them. It sits still, typically about 2 to 5 m (7 to 16 ft) above the ground in somewhat open areas, and captures prey mostly with short upward sallies from the perch to grab it from the underside of leaves and twigs. After a sally it typically lands on a different perch.

=== Breeding ===
The white-crested spadebill's breeding season has not been defined but includes November in Suriname and May in Colombia. Males make a display flight during which their wings whirr. Nothing else is known about the species' breeding biology.

=== Vocalization ===
The white-crested spadebill's song is "a rapid, rising falling musical trill: breeEEE-B'RRRrrrewww" and its call "a loud, descending squeak: pew!". Another rendition of its song is "pr're're'e'e'e'e'E'E'E'R'r'r'r'r'r'r'r'r".

== Status ==
The IUCN has assessed the white-crested spadebill as being of Least Concern. It has a large range; its population size is not known and is believed to be decreasing. No immediate threats have been identified. It is considered "uncommon and local" in Colombia, "rare and local" in Ecuador, "rare to uncommon" in Peru, and "uncommon to locally fairly common" in Venezuela. It occurs in several protected areas. "Although this is in general a scarce species, much of its habitat remains in relatively undisturbed condition."
