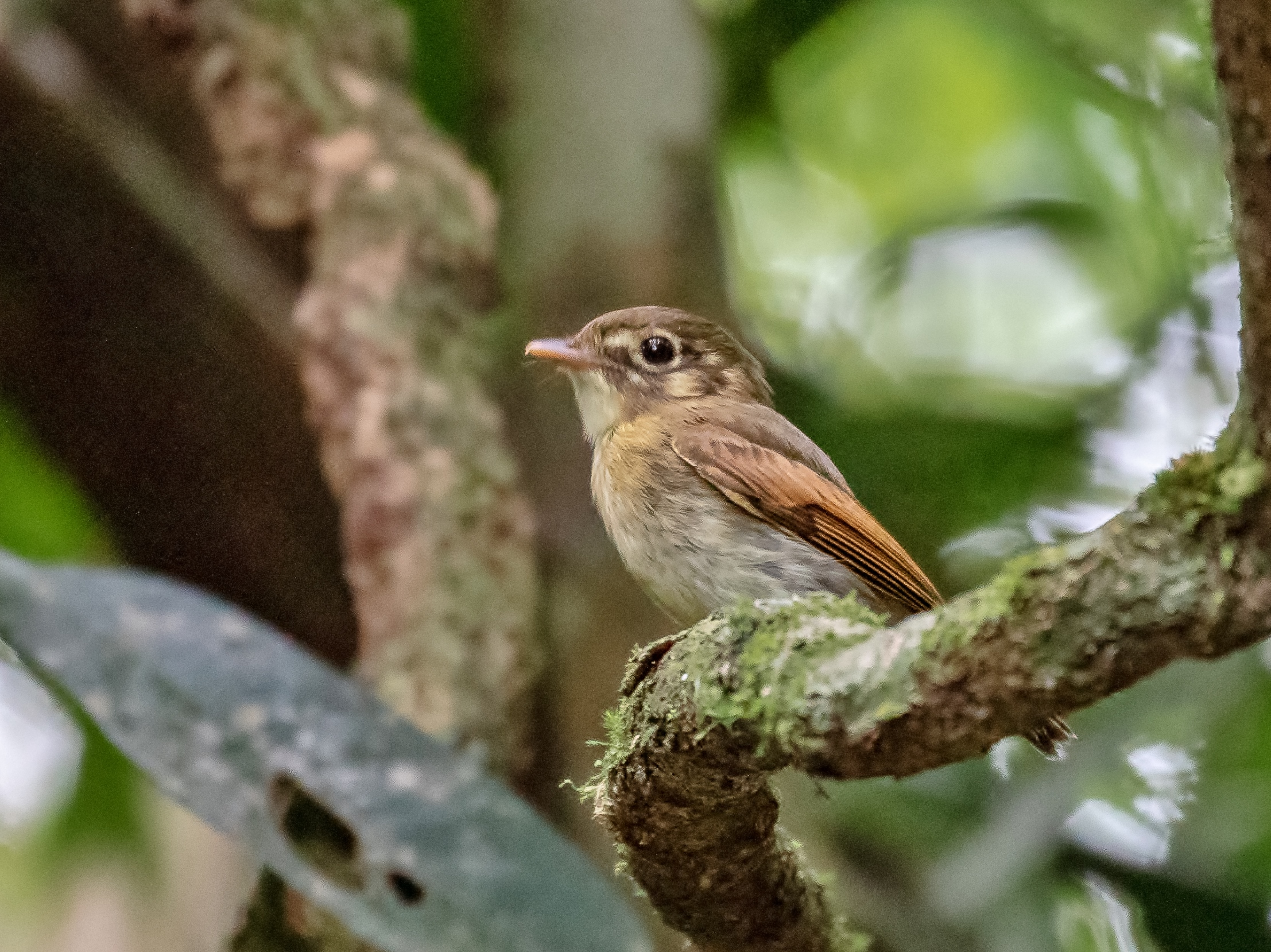

Conservation status
- Vulnerable (IUCN 3.1)

Scientific classification
- Kingdom: Animalia
- Phylum: Chordata
- Class: Aves
- Order: Passeriformes
- Family: Tyrannidae
- Genus: Platyrinchus
- Species: P. leucoryphus

Binomial name
- Platyrinchus leucoryphus Wied, 1831

= Russet-winged spadebill =

Species of bird

The russet-winged spadebill (Platyrinchus leucoryphus) is a Vulnerable species of bird in the family Tyrannidae, the tyrant flycatchers. It is found in Argentina, Brazil, and Paraguay.

== Taxonomy and systematics ==
The russet-winged spadebill is monotypic.

== Description ==
The russet-winged spadebill is the largest member of its genus. It is 12 to 12.5 cm (4.7 to 4.9 in) long and weighs about 17 g (0.60 oz). It has a large head and a longer tail than others of its genus. The sexes have the same plumage. Adults have an olive-brown crown with a partially hidden white patch in the center. They have pale buff-white to yellowish as a spot above the lores, as an eye-ring, and on the ear coverts. They have dark brown lores, a dark stripe through the eye, and a dark stripe below the pale ear coverts. Their upperparts are olive-brown. Their wings are brown with wide russet edges on the coverts and flight feathers. Their tail is brown. Their throat is white and their underparts mostly dull yellow or white with an olive-brown wash on the breast and sides. They have a dark brown iris, a wide flat bill with a yellow-edged black maxilla and a yellowish mandible, and pale orange to dull pinkish legs and feet.

== Distribution and habitat ==
The russet-winged spadebill is found in southeastern Brazil from Espirito Santo south to northeastern Santa Catarina and Rio Grande do Sul and from there west into eastern Paraguay and northeastern Argentina's Misiones Province. It is a bird of the Atlantic Forest, where it primarily inhabits the undergrowth of humid primary forest and mature secondary forest. In elevation it ranges from sea level to at least 1,000 m (3,300 ft).

== Behavior ==
=== Movement ===
The russet-winged spadebill is a year-round resident.

=== Feeding ===
The russet-winged spadebill feeds on arthropods. It typically forages singly and only once has been noted joining a mixed-species feeding flock. It sits still, typically in the crown of a small tree about 3 to 8 m (10 to 25 ft) above the ground, and captures prey mostly with short upward or outward sallies from the perch to grab it from the underside of leaves and twigs. After a sally it typically lands on a different perch.

=== Breeding ===
The russet-winged spadebill's breeding season spans at least September to November. Its nest is a cup made from pieces of dead leaves and lichen fibers with small pieces of bark held on the outside by spider silk. It is lined with softer fibers such as fungal rhizomorphs. Often leaf and lichen pieces dangle from the bottom of the nest. It is typically placed in a branch fork about 2.5 to 4.5 m (8 to 15 ft) above the ground. The clutch is two eggs. The incubation period, time to fledging, and details of parental care are not known.

=== Vocalization ===
The russet-winged spadebill's song is "a weak, thin, buzzy trill, bzee-eee-eép" and one call is "a loud ééo". Another call is a "high, angry-sounding tjuw".

== Status ==
The IUCN originally in 1988 assessed the russet-winged spadebill as Threatened but since 1994 as Vulnerable. It has a somewhat limited range and its estimated population of between 2500 and 10,000 mature individuals is believed to be decreasing. "The species appears to be reliant on areas with an open understorey and dense canopy typical of primary Atlantic forest. There is extensive and continuing loss and degradation of Atlantic forest throughout its range, through forest clearing and selective logging, which therefore constitute serious threats to this species." It is found in many protected areas in Brazil and in at least one in each of Paraguay and Argentina.
