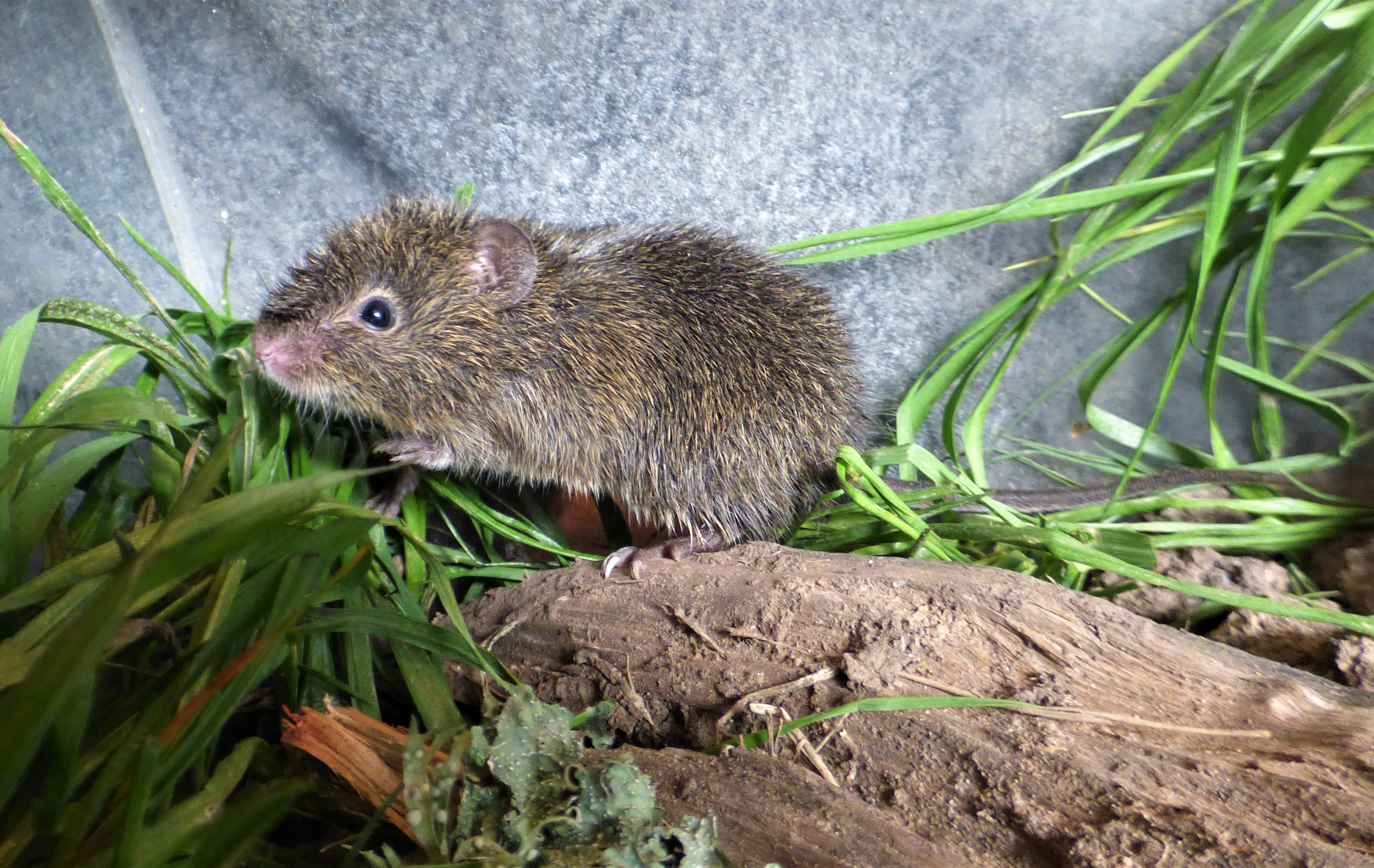

Conservation status
- Least Concern (IUCN 3.1)

Scientific classification
- Kingdom: Animalia
- Phylum: Chordata
- Class: Mammalia
- Order: Rodentia
- Family: Cricetidae
- Subfamily: Sigmodontinae
- Genus: Necromys
- Species: N. obscurus

Binomial name
- Necromys obscurus (Waterhouse, 1837)

Synonyms
- Bolomys obscurus (Waterhouse, 1837)

= Dark bolo mouse =

Species of rodent

The dark bolo mouse or dark-furred akodont (Necromys obscurus) is a species of rodent in the family Cricetidae. There are two subspecies; one (ssp. scagliarum) is found in eastern and central parts of Buenos Aires Province, Argentina, and the other (ssp. obscurus) in coastal areas of southern Uruguay.

== Description ==
The dark bolo mouse is the largest species in the genus, with a head-and-body length of about 110 mm (4.3 in) and a tail length of 75 mm (3.0 in). The fur is fairly long and glossy. The dorsal surface is dark brown to brownish-black, the individual hairs having black bases and tips and pale central portions, giving the pelage an "agouti" appearance. The cheeks and flanks are tinged with orange or buff and the underparts are greyish, the hairs having yellowish tips. The tail is deep brown above and grey underneath, and the upper surfaces of the hands are dark, with dark fur mixed with some buff hairs on the feet.

== Distribution and habitat ==
The dark bolo mouse is found in two separate locations; the coastal region of southern Uruguay, and the inland and coastal regions of eastern Buenos Aires Province in Argentina. The fossil record shows that at one time it had a wider distribution in Argentina. Its habitat includes grassland and the verges of cultivated fields, moist areas near streams, and rocky areas in hilly country.

== Ecology ==
The dark bolo mouse is mainly diurnal and normally lives on the ground surface although it sometimes undertakes some burrowing activity. It is an omnivore and feeds on small invertebrates such as crickets and beetles, as well as plant material.

== Status ==
The dark bolo mouse has a fragmented area of distribution. It is fairly common where it does occur, but seems not to tolerate disturbance to the meadows areas where it lives. The International Union for Conservation of Nature has assessed its conservation status as being "near threatened".
