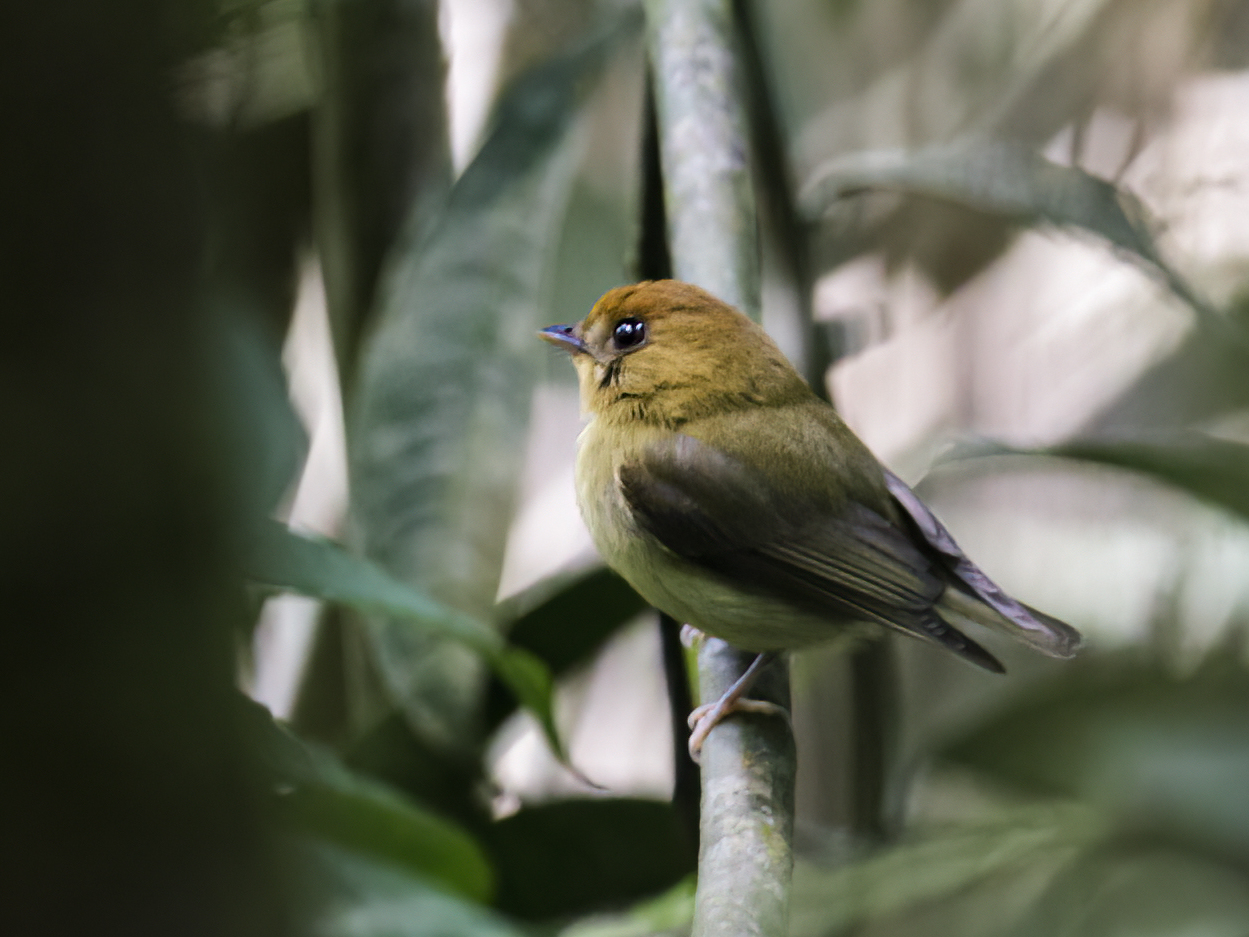

Conservation status
- Least Concern (IUCN 3.1)

Scientific classification
- Kingdom: Animalia
- Phylum: Chordata
- Class: Aves
- Order: Passeriformes
- Family: Tyrannidae
- Genus: Platyrinchus
- Species: P. flavigularis

Binomial name
- Platyrinchus flavigularis Sclater, PL, 1862

Synonyms
- Platyrhynchus flavigularis

= Yellow-throated spadebill =

Species of bird

The yellow-throated spadebill (Platyrinchus flavigularis) is a species of bird in the family Tyrannidae, the tyrant flycatchers. It is found in Colombia, Ecuador, Peru, and Venezuela.

== Taxonomy and systematics ==
The yellow-throated spadebill was originally described as Platyrhynchus flavigularis.

The yellow-throated spadebill has two subspecies, the nominate P. f. flavigularis (Sclater, PL, 1862) and P. f. vividus (Phelps, WH & Phelps, WH Jr, 1952). The subspecies have essentially the same appearance and "further work [is] required to confirm [the] true taxonomic status" of them.

== Description ==
The yellow-throated spadebill is 9.5 to 10.2 cm (3.7 to 4.0 in) long. It has a large head and a stubby tail. The sexes and subspecies have the same plumage. Adults have a mostly bright rufous-brown head with a partially hidden white patch in the center of the crown and a yellowish spot on the lores. Their upperparts are olive and their wings and tail are dusky olive. Their throat is bright yellow and their underparts mostly pale yellow with an indistinct olivaceous band across the breast. They have a dark iris, a wide flat bill with a blackish maxilla, a pale yellow mandible with a brighter yellow base, and pink legs and feet.

== Distribution and habitat ==
The yellow-throated spadebill apparently has a disjunct distribution, though some of the known separate populations may be linked. The nominate subspecies is found intermittently in Colombia's Eastern Andes, on the eastern slope of the Andes in Ecuador between Napo and Zamora-Chinchipe provinces, and on the eastern slope of the Andes of Peru between Amazonas and Cuzco departments. Subspecies P. f. vividus is found in the Serranía del Perijá on the Colombia-Venezuela border, in the Andes of Venezuela in southeastern Lara and southeastern Táchira states, and possibly in the Venezuelan Coastal Range in southeastern Carabobo. The species generally inhabits the undergrowth of foothill and montane forest. In Ecuador it appears to favor ridgetops whose forest has a rather open understory. In elevation it ranges between 1,350 and 2,400 m (4,400 and 7,900 ft) in Colombia, 750 and 1,700 m (2,500 and 5,600 ft) in Ecuador, 1,200 and 2,000 m (3,900 and 6,600 ft) in Peru. and 1,250 and 2,100 m (4,100 and 6,900 ft) in Venezuela.

== Behavior ==
=== Movement ===
The yellow-throated spadebill is a year-round resident.

=== Feeding ===
The yellow-throated spadebill is assumed to feed on arthropods, and its foraging behavior has not been documented. It is "[d]ifficult to observe; often perches motionless in the open for extended periods".

=== Breeding ===
The yellow-throated spadebill's breeding season in Venezuela spans at least April to June. Nothing else is known about the species' breeding biology.

=== Vocalization ===
The yellow-throated spadebill's song is "a rapid, rising trill ending with a sharp squeak: brrrreeEEEE'PEW!" and its call "a loud, descending squeak" pew!".

== Status ==
The IUCN has assessed the yellow-throated spadebill as being of Least Concern. It has a large range; its population size is not known and is believed to be decreasing. No immediate threats have been identified. It is considered "uncommon and local" in Colombia, "scarce and inconspicuous" in Ecuador, "apparently rare and local" in Peru, and "very spotty [but] at least locally fairly common" in Venezuela. Its "[c]onservation status probably merits re-assessment".
