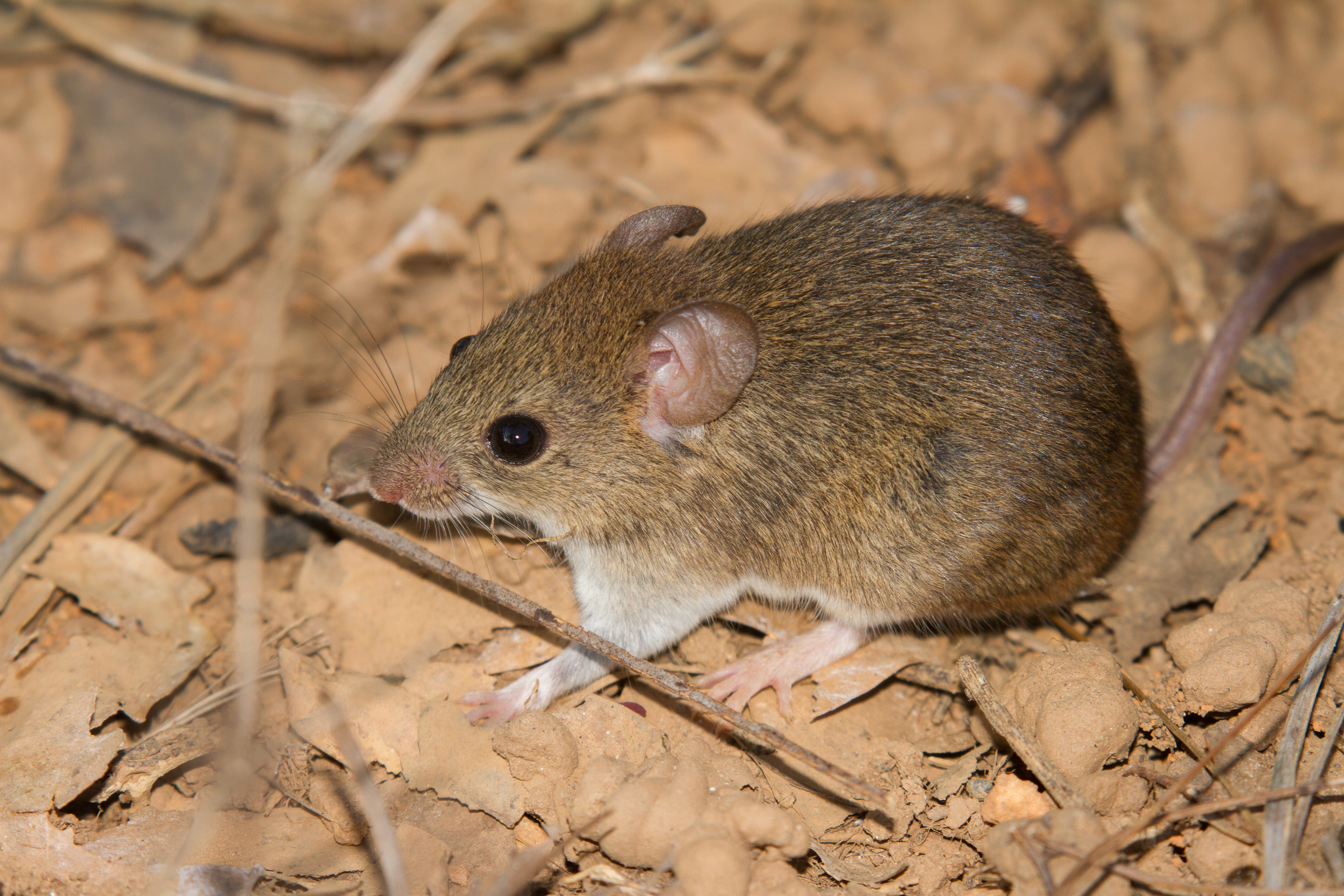

Conservation status
- Least Concern (IUCN 3.1)]

Scientific classification
- Kingdom: Animalia
- Phylum: Chordata
- Class: Mammalia
- Order: Rodentia
- Family: Cricetidae
- Subfamily: Sigmodontinae
- Genus: Necromys
- Species: N. lasiurus

Binomial name
- Necromys lasiurus (Lund, 1841)

= Hairy-tailed bolo mouse =

Species of rodent

The hairy-tailed bolo mouse or hairy-tailed akodont (Necromys lasiurus) is a South American rodent species of the family Cricetidae. It is found in Argentina, Bolivia, Brazil, and Paraguay.

== Description ==
The hairy-tailed bolo mouse grows to a head-and-body length between 118 and 138 mm (4.6 and 5.4 in), with a tail length of 66 to 96 mm (2.6 to 3.8 in). The ears are small and rounded, and have a sparse covering of hair. The body fur is variable in colour, but usually the back is olive grey to dark brown, the flanks are paler and washed with ochre, and the underparts are white or pale grey. The demarcation line between upper parts and underparts is ill-defined. The tail is bicolor, dark above and pale below, and clad in short, fairly dense fur, and the feet are brown on top with tufts of white hair between the digits, which have strong nails.

== Distribution and habitat ==
The hairy-tailed bolo mouse is native to southern South America. Its range extends from eastern and central Brazil as far west as Rondônia, through eastern Paraguay to northeastern Argentina. The exact boundaries are not well known, with various isolated outlying areas and with populations west of the Paraguay River overlapping the range of the Paraguayan bolo mouse (N. lenguarum). Its typical habitat is grassland, the verges of cultivated fields and areas of secondary woodland.

== Ecology ==
The hairy-tailed bolo mouse is mainly diurnal, with some activity at dusk and at night, particularly in the dry season. Its diet varies with the time of year, but mainly consists of seeds and green plant material, and sometimes includes small invertebrates. The breeding season is mostly in the spring and summer, and litter sizes average about five young. This mouse is a reservoir for certain hantaviruses, including the Araraquara strain from Brazil, which can cause disease in humans. It is a host of the Acanthocephalan intestinal parasite Moniliformis necromysi.
