= Urubupungá Airport =

Urubupungá–Ernesto Pochler Airport Aeroporto de Urubupungá–Ernesto Pochler
- IATA: ~~URB~~; ICAO: ~~SBUP~~

Summary
- Airport type: Defunct
- Operator: CESP (1965?–1984); Infraero (1984–2003); DAESP (2003–2005)
- Serves: Castilho
- Opened: 1973
- Closed: 2007
- Elevation AMSL: 1,168 ft (356 m)
- Coordinates: 20°46′27″S 051°33′53″W

Map
- Location in Brazil

Runways
| Direction | Length | | Surface |
| Direction | ft | m | Surface |
|---|---|---|---|
| ~~11/29~~ | ~~5,525~~ | ~~1,684~~ | ~~Asphalt~~ (closed) |
- No longer operational.

Urubupungá–Ernesto Pochler Airport, ~~(IATA: URB, ICAO: SBUP)~~, was an airport that served Castilho and Urubupungá Complex, in Brazil until 2003, when services were suspended. It was closed and abandoned and in 2005.

== History ==
Urubupungá–Ernesto Pochler Airport was built by CESP as a support structure for the operation of the Urubupungá complex, formed by the hydroelectric plants Ilha Solteira, Jupiá and Três Irmãos on Paraná river.

In 1984 the facility was transferred to Infraero, and a few years later, in 2003, it was transferred to DAESP.

In 2003 services were suspended due to bad conditions of the runway and in 2005 it was closed and abandoned.

On October 18, 2007 its license was permanently revoked.

== Access ==
The airport was located 19 km (12 mi) south of downtown Castilho.
