= Mouth of the Aguapeí Private Natural Heritage Reserve =

- Reserva Particular do Patrimônio Natural Foz do Aguapeí
- Location within Brazil
- Nearest city: Castilho, São Paulo
- Coordinates: 21°03′51″S 51°45′24″W
- Area: 8,885.33 hectares (21,956.1 acres)
- Designation: Private natural heritage reserve
- Created: 19 December 2010
- Administrator: CESP

The Mouth of the Aguapeí Private Natural Heritage Reserve (Portuguese: Reserva Particular do Patrimônio Natural Foz do Aguapeí) is a private natural heritage reserve in the state of São Paulo, Brazil. It protects an area of marshland known as the "Pantanal of São Paulo" where the Aguapeí River enters the Paraná River.

== Location ==
The Mouth of the Aguapeí Private Natural Heritage Reserve (RPPN) is divided between the municipalities of Castilho, São João do Pau d'Alho and Pauliceia in the state of São Paulo. It has an area of 8,885.33 hectares (21,956.1 acres). It is located at the mouth of the Aguapeí River on the Paraná River, and the Ilha Comprida. It forms a continuous protected area with the Aguapeí State Park, which is part of the environmental compensation for the Eng Sérgio Motta Dam.

The reserve protects one of the last naturally flooded areas of the state, home to marsh deer and other species typical of this environment. It should reduce sand and clay mining, and strengthen enforcement against hunting the deer for sale of antlers or stuffed heads. The reserve supports environmental education and research.

== Environment ==
The reserve is covered by secondary growth of seasonal semi-deciduous forest, arboreal/shrub/herbaceous formations in the várzea areas, and areas of riparian palms. Vegetation includes the vulnerable Euterpe edulis (Jussara palmito). Vulnerable, threatened or endangered fauna include horned screamer (Anhima cornuta), wood stork (Mycteria americana), black-collared hawk (Busarellus nigricollis), jabiru (Jabiru mycteria), American pygmy kingfisher (Chloroceryle aenea), toco toucan (Ramphastos toco), blue-and-yellow macaw (Ara ararauna) and South American tapir (Tapirus terrestris).

The "Pantanal Paulista Wildlife Refuge", as it was called in earlier discussions, would be part of the proposed Trinational Biodiversity Corridor, which aims to provide forest connections between conservation units in Brazil, Paraguay and Argentina in the Upper Paraná ecoregion.

== History ==
On 16 April 2003 the State Council for the Environment of São Paulo (Consema) approved the environmental compensation agreement for the Três Irmãos Hydroelectric Plant of the Companhia Energética de São Paulo (CESP). The mouth of the Aguapeí River was to be made a 15,960 hectares (39,400 acres) wildlife refuge. The RPPN was created by resolution 117 of 19 December 2010. As of 2016 CESP listed the RPPN Foz do Aguapeí as having an area of 13,953.79 hectares (34,480.6 acres). In fact the RPPN proper has an area of 8,885.33 hectares (21,956.1 acres), covering 63.67% of the CESP property. CESP was required to provide a total of 12,820 hectares (31,700 acres) including the buffer zone of the reserve.

== Sources ==
- Araújo Corte, Dione Angélica de; Valladares-Pádua, Cláudio Benedito (November 2007), Plano de Manejo da Estação Ecológica Mico-Leão-Preto (PDF) (in Portuguese), Brasília: ICMBio
- "Conselho garante protecao a habitat de cervos-do-pantanal", Tribuna de Imprensa (in Portuguese), Rio de Janeiro, 17 April 2003
- Covas, Bruno (2013), "Reserva Particular do Patrimônio Natural Foz do Rio Aguapeí", Anuário das Reservas Particulares do Patrimônio Natural Instituídas pela Secretaria do Meio Ambiente do Estado de São Paulo (PDF) (in Portuguese), Secretario do Meio Ambiente do Estado de São Paulo, archived from the original (PDF) on 2016-02-20
- Reserva Natural da CESP no rio Aguapeí é reconhecida (in Portuguese), CESP, 6 January 2011
- Unidades de Conservação (in Portuguese), CSEP: Companhia Energética de São Paulo, archived from the original on 2014-05-02
