= Castilho, São Paulo =

Municipality in the state of São Paulo, Brazil

Castilho
- Municipality
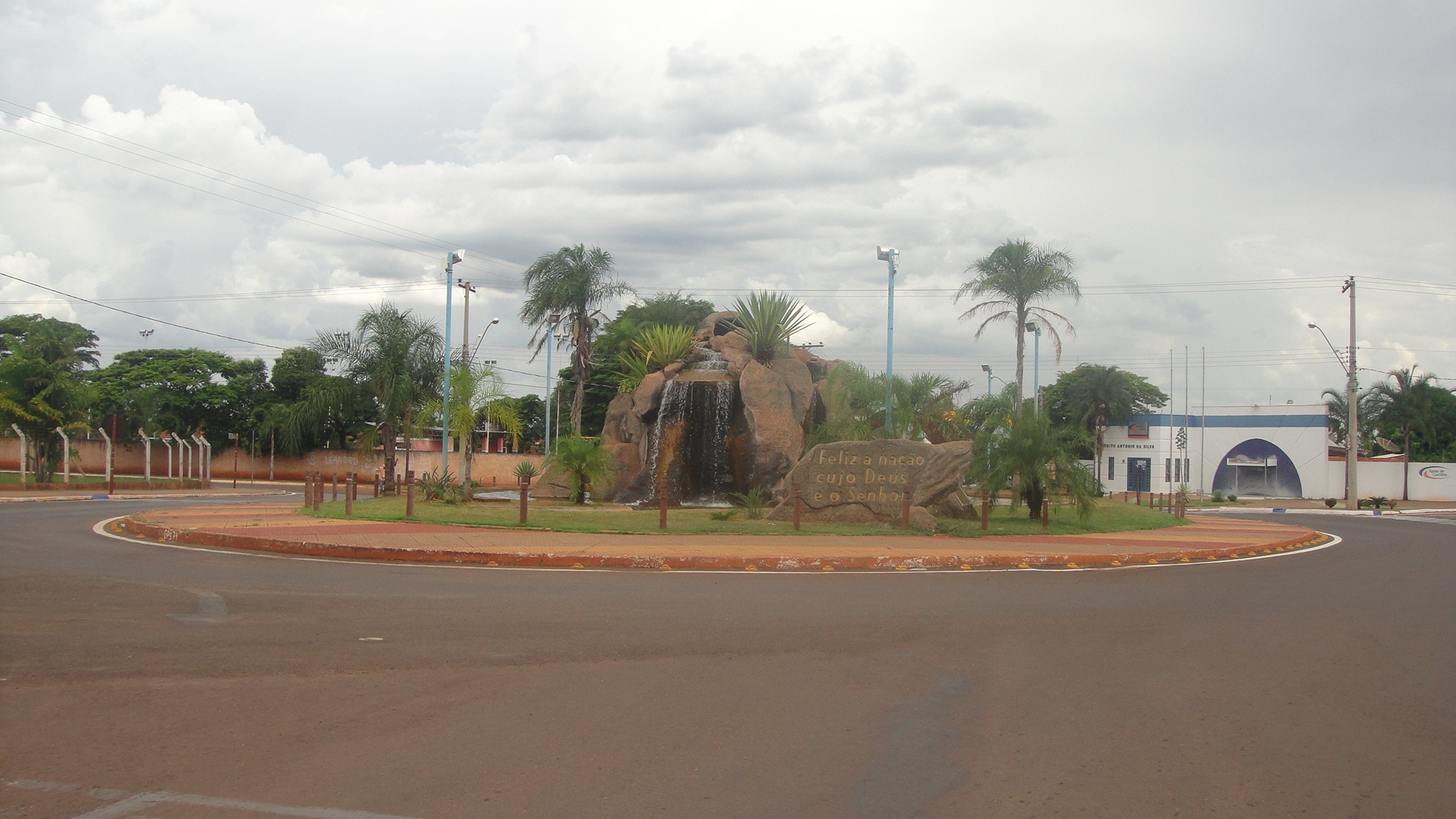

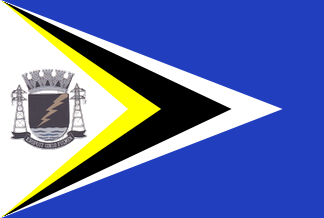
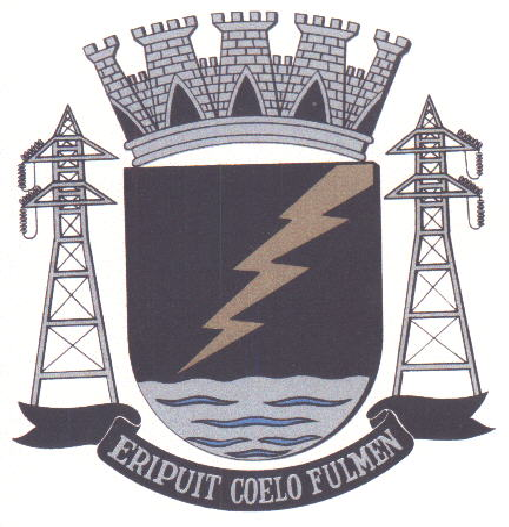
- Flag Coat of arms
- Nickname: Paraíso do Pescador (Fisherman's Paradise)
- Motto: Eripuit Coelo Fulmen (Snatched the Lightning From the Sky)
- Anthem: Hino do município de Castilho
- Interactive map of Castilho
- Location within the State of São Paulo Location within Brazil Location within South America
- Coordinates: 20°52′20″S 51°29′15″W
- Country: Brazil
- Region: Southeast
- State: São Paulo
- Mesoregion: Araçatuba
- Microregion: Andradina
- Founded: 10 August 1934
- Incorporated: 30 December 1953
- Founder: Armel Miranda
- Named for: Alfredo de Castilho

Government
  - Type: Mayor–council
  - Mayor: Paulo Duarte Boaventura (REP)
  - Municipal Chamber: Councilors: Ademar Onorio Ribeiro (Republicanos); Ailton Pereira de Souza (PV); Daniel Batista de Oliveira (Republicanos); Flávio José do Nascimento (DEM); Giovany Vicente da Silva (Republicanos); Itamar Vieira dos Santos (PL); João Paulo Soares de Araújo (PTB); Odair de Oliveira Souza (DEM); Sebastião Reis de Oliveira (DEM); Wagner de Souza Oliveira (PV); Waldomiro Evangelista da Cruz (PSD)

Area
  - Municipality: 1,065.318 km^{2} (411.322 sq mi)
  - Rank: 1,359th, Brazil
- Highest elevation (Urban area): 378.46 m (1,241.7 ft)
- Lowest elevation (Pontal): 263.09 m (863.2 ft)

Population (2010)
  - Municipality: 18,003
  - Estimate (2021): 21,521
  - Rank: 1,839th, Brazil
  - Density: 16.89/km^{2} (43.7/sq mi)
  - Urban: 13,586
  - Rural: 4,417
- Demonym: castilhense

Ethnicity
  - White: 54.42% (9,797 inhabitants)
  - Pardo: 40.11% (7,220 inhabitants)
  - Black: 4.16% (749 inhabitants)
  - Yellow: 1.29% (231 inhabitants)
  - Indian: 0.03% (5 inhabitants)
- Time zone: UTC−3 (BRT)
- Postal codes: 16920-000
- Area code: 18
- HDI (2010): 0.731 – high
- Website: Official website

Castilho (Portuguese pronunciation: [kasˈtiʎu]) is a municipality in the state of São Paulo, in Brazil. It has an estimated population of 21,521 (as of 2021) in an area of 1,065.318 km^{2} (411 sq mi), and its elevation is of 378.46 m (1,242 ft) above the sea level.

The municipality contains 3.69% of the 9,044 hectares (22,350 acres) of the Aguapeí State Park, created in 1998. It contains part of the 8,885.33 hectares (21,956.1 acres) of the Mouth of the Aguapeí Private Natural Heritage Reserve, created in 2010.

== Media ==
In telecommunications, the city was served by Companhia de Telecomunicações do Estado de São Paulo until 1975, when it began to be served by Telecomunicações de São Paulo. In July 1998, this company was acquired by Telefónica, which adopted the Vivo brand in 2012.

The company is currently an operator of cell phones, fixed lines, internet (fiber optics/4G) and television (satellite and cable).

== Mayors ==
This is a list of mayors from Castilho.

No.	Name	Broken	Start of term	End of term	Comments
1	Antônio Vieira de Brito (1907–1979)		January 1, 1955	January 1, 1959	Mayor-elect
2	Alípio Aparecido de Oliveira (1923–2004)	PSD	January 1, 1959	January 1, 1963	Mayor-elect
3	Antônio Vieira de Brito (1907–1979)		January 1, 1963	October 1, 1963	Mayor-elect, resigned
4	Vicente Delboni (1916–2018)		October 1, 1963	January 1, 1967	Vice Mayor, took office after the incumbent's resignation
5	Sebastião Antônio da Silva (1918–2001)	ARENA	January 1, 1967	January 31, 1970	Mayor-elect
6	Miguel Moitinho (1931–2021)	ARENA	January 31, 1970	January 31, 1973	Mayor-elect
—	Lourival da Cruz (1942–present)	ARENA	January 31, 1973	February 5, 1973	President of the Chamber, took over on an interim basis after the vacancy of the position
7	Francisco Sampaio de Souza (1920–2008)	ARENA	February 5, 1973	November 21, 1979	Appointed Mayor
8	José Jorge Zahr (1937–2012)	PDS	November 21, 1979	April 11, 1985	Appointed Mayor
9	Vicente Firmino da Silva (1925–2014)	PDS	April 11, 1985	January 1, 1986	Appointed Mayor
10	José Miguel do Nascimento (1951–2004)	PFL	January 1, 1986	January 1, 1989	Mayor-elect
11	Adão Severino Batista (1936–2011)	PFL	January 1, 1989	January 1, 1993	Mayor-elect
12	José Miguel do Nascimento (1951–2004)	PTB	January 1, 1993	January 1, 1997	Mayor-elect
12	José Miguel do Nascimento (1951–2004)	PSDB	January 1, 1993	January 1, 1997	Mayor-elect
13	Adão Severino Batista (1936–2011)	PFL	January 1, 1997	January 1, 2001	Mayor-elect
13	Adão Severino Batista (1936–2011)	PPB	January 1, 1997	January 1, 2001	Mayor-elect
14	Joni Marcos Buzachero (1961–present)	PSDC	January 1, 2001	January 1, 2005	Mayor-elect
14	Joni Marcos Buzachero (1961–present)	PSDB	January 1, 2005	January 1, 2009	Mayor re-elected
15	Antônio Carlos Ribeiro (1947–2026)	PTB	January 1, 2009	January 1, 2013	Mayor–elect
16	Joni Marcos Buzachero (1961–present)	PSDB	January 1, 2013	January 1, 2017	Mayor-elect
17	Aparecida de Fátima Gavioli Nascimento (1955–present)	DEM	January 1, 2017	January 1, 2021	Mayor-elect
18	Paulo Duarte Boaventura (1961–present)	REP	January 1, 2021	January 1, 2025	Mayor-elect
18	Paulo Duarte Boaventura (1961–present)	PP	January 1, 2025	current	Mayor re-elected

Presidents of the City Hall

- Victório Simonetti: 1955–1956
- Bellarmino da Silva França: 1957
- Magide Jorge: 1958
- Djaniro Maciel de Oliveira: 1959–1960
- Djaniro Maciel de Oliveira: 1961–1962
- José Alexandre Trindade: 1963–1964
- Cid of Jesus Leite Penteado: 1965–1966
- Cid of Jesus Leite Penteado: 1967
- Aylton D’Ângelo: 1968–1969
- José Jorge Zahr: 1970–1971
- Aylton D’Ângelo: 1972
- Lourival da Cruz: 1973–1974
- Mytio Shinohara: 1975–1976
- Ademar Peixoto Martins: 1977–1978
- Adão Severino Batista: 1979–1980
- Milton Brito Neves: 1981–1982
- Vicente Firmino da Silva: 1983–1984
- Adão Severino Batista: 1985
- Jailton Pereira de Souza: 1986
- Manoel Ortiz: 1987–1988
- Antonio Nilson Pontim: 1989–1990
- Jailton Pereira de Souza: 1991–1992
- Nilson Soares da Natividade: 1993–1994
- Valdir Camilo de Azevedo: 1995–1996
- João Roberto Lameu: 1997–1998
- Daniel Batista de Oliveira: 1999–2000
- Vitor Sotini: 2001–2002
- Valdenir Bispo dos Santos: 2003–2004
- Carlos Roberto de Oliveira: 2005–2006
- Carlos Roberto de Oliveira: 2007–2008
- Daniel Batista de Oliveira: 2009–2010
- Sebastião Reis de Oliveira: 2011–2012
- Wagner de Souza Oliveira: 2013–2014
- Wagner de Souza Oliveira: 2015–2016
- Sebastião Reis de Oliveira: 2017–2018
- Sebastião Reis de Oliveira: 2019–2020
- Ailton Pereira de Souza: 2021–2022
- Ailton Pereira de Souza: 2023–2024
- João Paulo Soares de Araújo: 2025–2026

== Transportation ==
Castilho was served by Urubupungá–Ernesto Pochler Airport. It was a support structure for the operation of the Urubupungá complex, formed by the hydroelectric plants Ilha Solteira, Jupiá and Três Irmãos on Paraná river. However, in 2003, services were suspended due to the bad conditions of the runway and in 2005 the facility was abandoned.

== See also ==
- List of municipalities in São Paulo
- Interior of São Paulo
