= Aguapeí State Park =

State park in São Paulo, Brazil

- Parque Estadual do Aguapeí
- IUCN category II (national park)
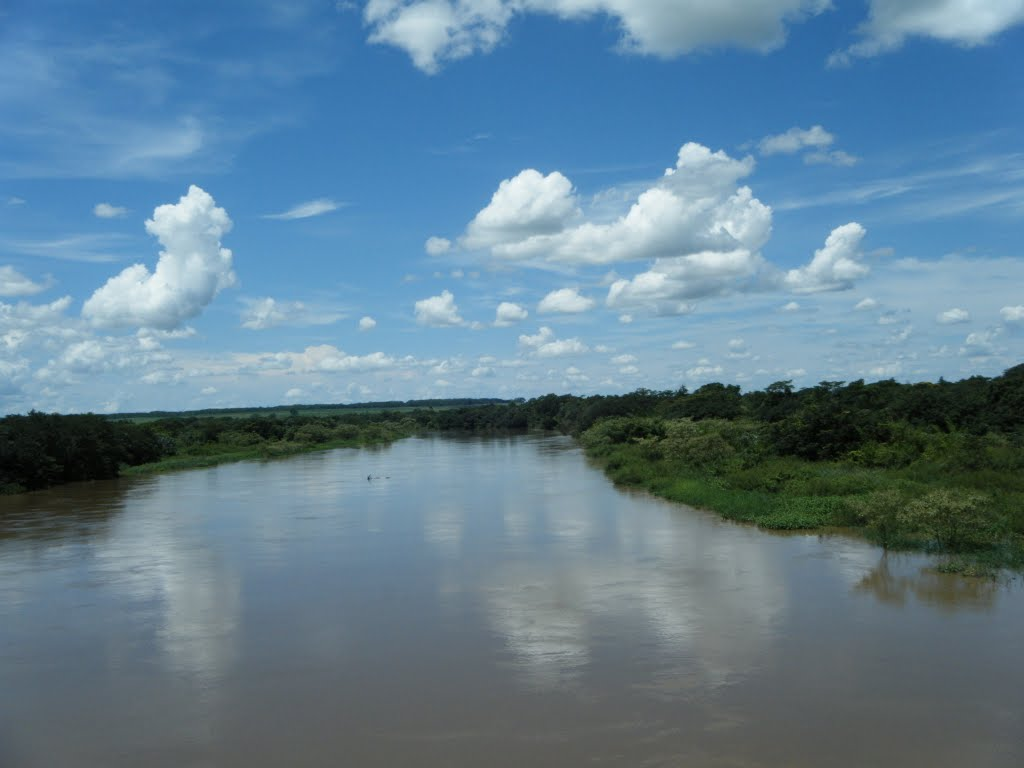
- Aguapeí river and state park during the flood period

- Location within Brazil
- Nearest city: Guaraçaí, São Paulo
- Coordinates: 21°13′37″S 51°29′29″W
- Area: 9,044 hectares (22,350 acres)
- Designation: State park
- Created: 2 July 1998
- Administrator: Secretaria do Meio Ambiente do Estado de São Paulo

The Aguapeí State Park (Portuguese: Parque Estadual do Aguapeí) is a state park in the state of São Paulo, Brazil. It protects an area of floodplain in the Atlantic Forest biome, home to many water birds.

== Location ==
The Aguapeí State Park is divided between the municipalities of Castilho (2.57%), Guaraçaí (38.42%), Junqueirópolis (16.46%), Monte Castelo (18.73%), Nova Independência (21.58%) and São João do Pau d'Alho (2.24%) in the state of São Paulo. It has an area of 9,044 hectares (22,350 acres). The park is about 10 kilometres (6.2 mi) upstream from the point where the Aguapeí River joins Paraná River. The park would be part of the proposed Trinational Biodiversity Corridor, which aims to provide forest connections between conservation units in Brazil, Paraguay and Argentina in the Upper Paraná ecoregion.

== Environment ==
The park contains large areas of floodplain, and is flooded in the rainy season when the Aguapeí overflows its banks. It is in the Atlantic Forest biome and contains seasonal semi-deciduous forest. Plants typical of this environment include Albizia hasslerii, Aspidosperma polyneuron, Pterogyne nitens, Schizolobium parahyba, Handroanthus heptaphyllus, Tabebuia ochracea and Zeyheria tuberculosa. There are also areas of várzea vegetation.

Mammals include capybara, tapir and deer. Bird species include jabiru (Jabiru mycteria), wood stork (Mycteria americana), maguari stork (Ciconia maguari), spoonbill, great egret (Ardea alba), snowy egret (Egretta thula), garganey (Anas querquedula), Neotropic cormorant (Phalacrocorax brasilianus) and southern screamer (Chauna torquata).

== History ==
The Aguapeí State Park was created as compensation when the Companhia Energética de São Paulo (CESP) built the Primavera Hydroelectric Power Plant on the Paraná River. The dam would flood 13,227.39 hectares (32,685.6 acres) of the Lagoa São Paulo Reserve and 3,211.35 hectares (7,935.4 acres) of the Great Pontal Reserve. The park was created by state decree 43.269 on 2 July 1998 with an area of 9,043.97 hectares (22,348.1 acres). The purpose is to fully protect fauna, flora and natural beauty, while allowing the park to be used for educational, recreational and scientific purposes.

Decree 44.730 of 28 February 2000 defined necessary public areas in the park. Fishing regulations were published on 2 October 2008, covering conservation areas and their buffer zones in the Paraná River basin. They were the Morro do Diabo State Park, Rio do Peixe State Park, Rio Aguapeí State Park, Mico Leão Preto Ecological Station, Ivinhema State Park, Ilha Grande National Park, Caiuá Ecological Station and Iguaçu National Park.

The perimeter of the park has been fenced, and the land has been acquired and donated to the state of São Paulo. The administrative headquarters and visitor center were opened in December 2015. Governor Geraldo Alckmin and Environment Secretary Patricia Iglecias attended the ceremony. The park was scheduled to be opened to the public early in 2016.

== Sources ==
- Araújo Corte, Dione Angélica de; Valladares-Pádua, Cláudio Benedito (November 2007), Plano de Manejo da Estação Ecológica Mico-Leão-Preto (PDF) (in Portuguese), Brasília: ICMBio, archived from the original (PDF) on 2016-11-07
- PES do Aguapeí (in Portuguese), ISA: Instituto Socioambiental
- "3", Plano de Manejo - Parque Estadual do Aguapeí (PDF) (in Portuguese), January 2012, archived from the original (PDF) on 2016-11-09
- Sede administrativa e Centro de Visitantes do Parque Estadual Aguapeí são entregues em Nova Independência (SP) (in Portuguese), Fundação Florestal SP, 23 December 2015
- Unidades de Conservação (in Portuguese), CESP: Companhia Energética de São Paulo, archived from the original on 2014-05-02
