= Junqueirópolis =

- Municipality
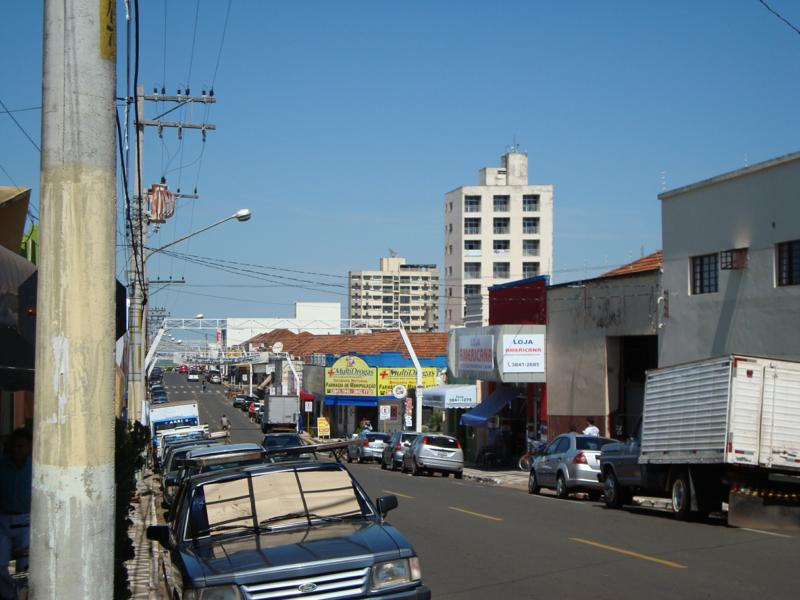

- Flag Coat of arms

- Location in São Paulo state

- Location in Brazil
- Coordinates: 21°30′53″S 51°26′01″W
- Country: Brazil
- Region: Southeast
- State: São Paulo

Area
  - Total: 583 km^{2} (225 sq mi)

Population (2020)
  - Total: 20,831
  - Density: 35.7/km^{2} (92.5/sq mi)
- Time zone: UTC−3 (BRT)
- Website: www.junqueiropolis.sp.gov.br

Junqueirópolis is a city and surrounding municipality in the western region of the state of São Paulo, Brazil. The population was estimated to be 20,831 in 2020. Rio do Peixe (Fish River) and Rio Aguapeí (Aguapeí River) are major rivers of the region.

== History ==
At the start of the 20th century this area was largely unexplored and undeveloped. It was not until 1941 that the Companhia Paulista de Estrada de Ferro (São Paulo Locomotive Company) ran railroad tracks through this remote hinterland.

Over the next few years Alvaro de Oliveira Junqueira, a wealthy inhabitant of the city of São Paulo, began buying up land here upon which he established coffee plantations. On 1 November 1944 the municipal division of Patrimônio de Junqueira (Junqueira's Patrimony) was established and land development proceeded as lots were sold to investors.

Horácio Cajado de Oliveira, Enrique Coutinho and Jose Amatruda were among those that settled here during this period. Another early settler was Torataro Takitami, a representative of the country's growing Japanese Brazilian population.

The municipality was created by state law in 1948.

Map of the state of São Paulo (1948).

The place name has been formed by joining Junqueira's surname with the Greek language-derived suffix -polis meaning "city".

== Geography ==
The municipality of Junqueirópolis has an area of 583 square kilometers, of which 5 square kilometers are the city of Junqueirópolis. Its elevation is 421 meters.

The municipality contains 16.5% of the 9,044 hectares (22,350 acres) of Aguapeí State Park, created in 1998.

== Economy ==
=== Agriculture ===
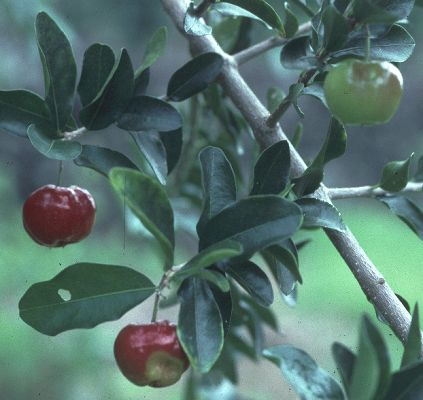
This is the Vitamin C rich fruit for which Junqueirópolis has been nicknamed Capital da Acerola, the "Acerola Capital".

Outside the urban area, Junqueirópolis is a hilly, agricultural region that produces valuable crops that thrive in a subtropical climate. For this reason the municipality promotes itself as Cidade Verde, "Green City".

Among the fruits grown here, acerola is important enough to the local economy that Junqueirópolis has another nickname -- Capital da Acerola, the "Acerola Capital". In the 1998–1999 season Junqueirópolis produced 2,450 tons of this fruit. The predominant type of acerola produced here is the "Olivier", a variety that is packed with the Vitamin C (1.200 mg/100ml of juice and 1.400 mg/100g of pulp) for which this plant is primarily cultivated and can be cultivated with little pesticide.

Junqueirópolis is also known for its grapes. Among the most widely cultivated varieties of grape in Junqueirópolis are Itália, Benitaka, Brazil and Ruby. Grapes from this region are made into table wines of excellent quality.

Other major crops grown in Junqueirópolis are maize, cotton, and coffee. The importance of produce production to this region is demonstrated in the depiction of the municipal coat of arms shown above which has been illustrated with acerola, grapes, sugarcane, etc.

== Media ==
In telecommunications, the city was served by Telecomunicações de São Paulo. In July 1998, this company was acquired by Telefónica, which adopted the Vivo brand in 2012. The company is currently an operator of cell phones, fixed lines, internet (fiber optics/4G) and television (satellite and cable).

== Penitentiary ==
The penitentiary in Junqueirópolis was the site of some of the violence of 2006 that swept the prisons of São Paulo state and involved deadly clashes between Primeiro Comando da Capital (a prison gang) and Polícia Militar do Estado de São Paulo (the state police).

== Religion ==
Christianity is present in the city as follows:

=== Catholic Church ===
The Catholic church in the municipality is part of the Roman Catholic Diocese of Marília.

=== Protestant Church ===
The most diverse evangelical beliefs are present in the city, mainly Pentecostal, including the Assemblies of God in Brazil (the largest evangelical church in the country), Christian Congregation in Brazil, among others. These denominations are growing more and more throughout Brazil.

== See also ==
- List of municipalities in São Paulo
- Flag of Junqueirópolis
