= Pauliceia =

- Municipality
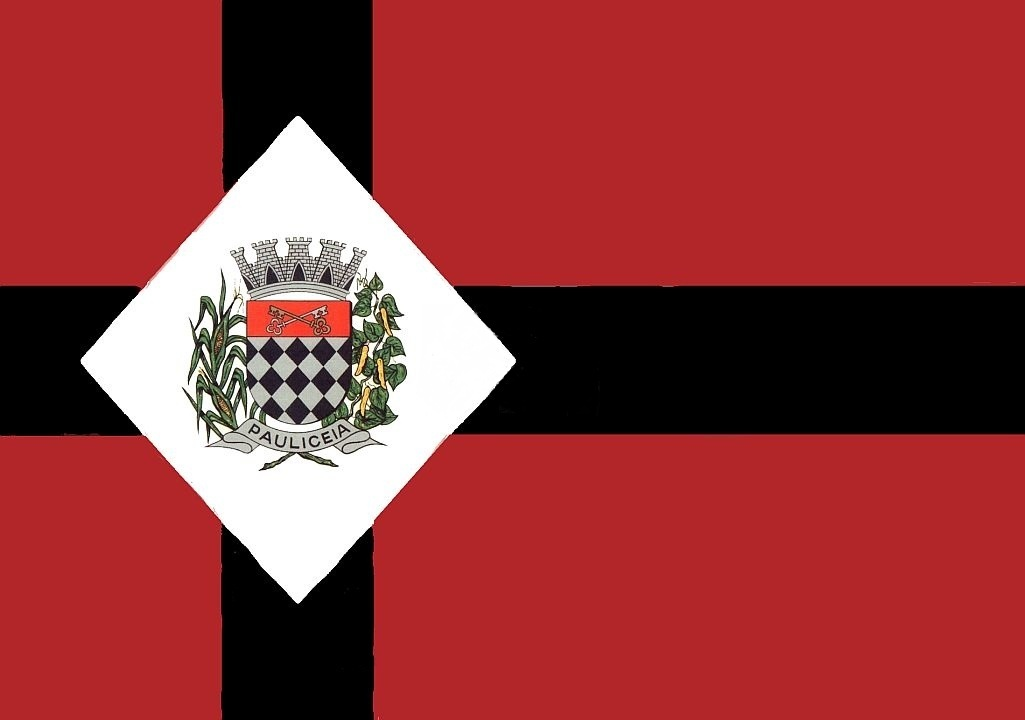
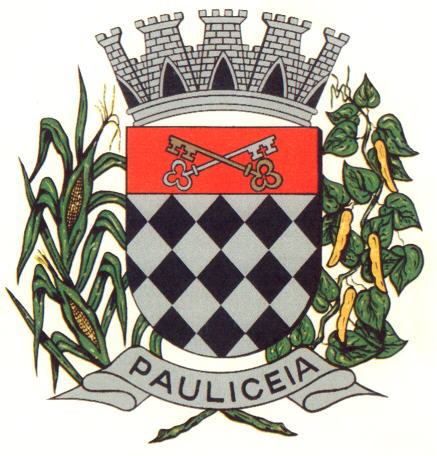
- Flag Coat of arms

- Location in São Paulo state

- Location in Brazil
- Coordinates: 21°19′04″S 51°49′51″W
- Country: Brazil
- Region: Southeast
- State: São Paulo

Area
  - Total: 374.091 km^{2} (144.437 sq mi)
- Elevation: 328 m (1,076 ft)

Population (2020)
  - Total: 7,454
  - Density: 19.93/km^{2} (51.61/sq mi)
- Time zone: UTC−3 (BRT)
- Postal code: 17990-000
- Area code: +55 18
- Website: www.pauliceia.sp.gov.br

Pauliceia is a municipality located in interior of the state of São Paulo, Brazil. The population is 7,454 (2020 est.) in an area of 374.1 km^{2}. The elevation is 328 m.

== History ==
The settlement Pauliceia was founded by Ezequiel Joaquim de Oliveira on June 29, 1947. The property was opened in order to locate a city on the banks of the Parana River, for future exchanges with the neighboring state of Mato Grosso (current state of Mato Grosso do Sul).

With the advent of the promulgation of the new Constitutional Charter of the State of São Paulo, which released the creation of new municipalities, especially on the border with other states, the population of the village Pauliceia managed to raise the county, supported by the Organic Law of Municipalities.

Pauliceia was elevated to district and municipality, of lands separated from Gracianópolis (current Tupi Paulista), by Law No. 233 of December 24, 1948. As council was formed with the districts of peace Pauliceia, Panorama and Santa Mercedes.

Map of the state of São Paulo (1948).

By Law No. 2456 of December 30, 1953, were dismembered Pauliceia of Panorama and the districts of Santa Mercedes. Although the Law No. 233 of December 24, 1948, the municipality was Pauliceia belonging to the county of Lucélia. Was incorporated into the district of Dracena, by Law No. 2456 of December 30, 1953, implemented on 1 January 1954.

== Geography ==
The municipality contains part of the 8,885 hectares (21,960 acres) Mouth of the Aguapeí Private Natural Heritage Reserve, created in 2010. On the shores of Paraná River are scenic fishing spots. In addition to the Aguapeí River.

== Demographics ==
Census Data - 2000

- Total population: 5,302
- Urban: 3,934
- Rural: 1368
- Men: 2,755
- Women: 2,547
- Population density (inhabitants / km ²): 14.14
- Infant mortality 1 year (per thousand): 17.89
- Life expectancy (year): 70.18
- Fertility rate (children per woman): 3.10
- Literacy Rate: 85.52
- Human Development Index: 0.754
- Income: 0.670
- Longevity: 0.753
- Education: 0.838

== Media ==
In telecommunications, the city was served by Telecomunicações de São Paulo. In July 1998, this company was acquired by Telefónica, which adopted the Vivo brand in 2012.

The company is currently an operator of cell phones, fixed lines, internet (fiber optics/4G) and television (satellite and cable).

== Religion ==
Christianity is present in the city as follows:

=== Catholic Church ===
The Catholic church in the municipality is part of the Roman Catholic Diocese of Marília.

=== Protestant Church ===
The most diverse evangelical beliefs are present in the city, mainly Pentecostal, including the Assemblies of God in Brazil (the largest evangelical church in the country), Christian Congregation in Brazil, among others. These denominations are growing more and more throughout Brazil.

== See also ==
- List of municipalities in São Paulo
