= Palometa River =

Coordinates: 27°55′56″S 59°6′8″W

Location
- Country: Argentina

Physical characteristics
- Mouth
  - location: Paraná Miní River

The Palometa River (Spanish, Riacho Palometa, or variant name Río Palometa) is a river of Chaco Province, Argentina. It is a tributary of the Paraná Miní River.

== See also ==
- List of rivers of Argentina
