= Guaraçaí =

- Municipality
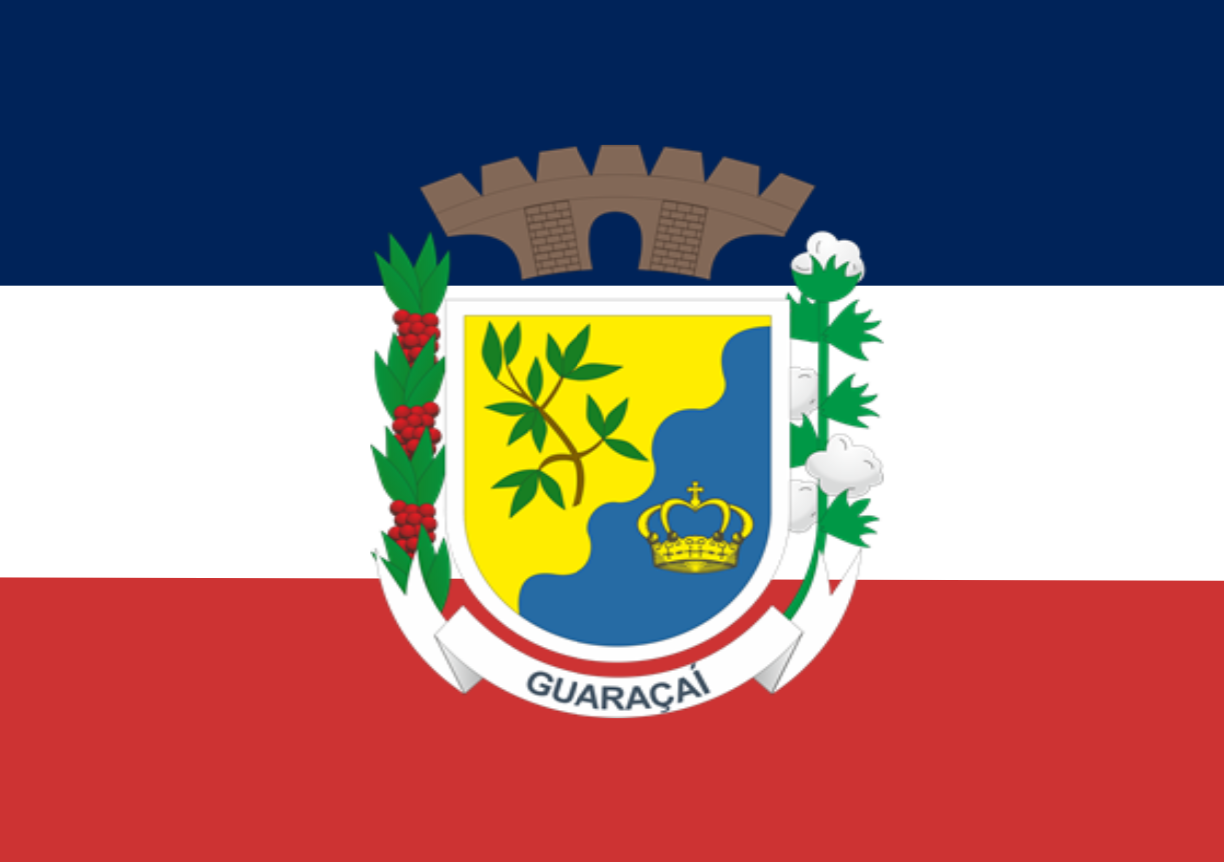
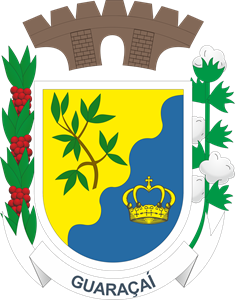
- Flag Coat of arms
- Etymology: coaracy (Sun)
- Nicknames: Capital do Abacaxi (Pineapple Capital), Cidade Presépio (Nativity Scene City)
- Anthem: Hino a Guaraçaí
- Location within the State of São Paulo
- Interactive map of Guaraçaí
- Location within the State of São Paulo Location within Brazil Location within South America
- Coordinates: 21°1′42″S 51°12′24″W
- Country: Brazil
- Region: Southeast
- State: São Paulo
- Mesoregion: Araçatuba
- Microregion: Andradina
- Incorporated: 24 December 1948
- Founder: João Machado de Souza
- Named for: Moldenhawera floribunda

Government
  - Type: Mayor–council
  - Mayor: Nelson Kazumi Tanaka (Cidadania)
  - Municipal Chamber: Councilors: Ademar Fontes (PSDB); Adriano Freschi (PL); Fernando da Silva Gimenes (Cidadania); Ivo Luperini (MDB); João Batista Lima (PV); Manoel José Fernandes Neto (PSDB); Marcos Muniz da Silva (MDB); Osmar Rodrigues da Silva (MDB); Patricia Cristina Caetano do Nascimento (PSDB)

Area
  - Municipality: 569.197 km^{2} (219.768 sq mi)
  - Rank: 2,246th, Brazil
- Elevation: 440.22 m (1,444.3 ft)

Population (2010)
  - Municipality: 8,435
  - Estimate (2020): 8,290
  - Rank: 3,277th, Brazil
  - Density: 14.8/km^{2} (38/sq mi)
  - Urban: 6,654
  - Rural: 1,781
- Demonym: guaraçaiense

Ethnicity
  - White: 60.12% (5,071 inhabitants)
  - Pardo: 32.77% (2,764 inhabitants)
  - Black: 3.84% (324 inhabitants)
  - Yellow: 3.27% (276 inhabitants)
- Time zone: UTC−3 (BRT)
- Postal codes: 16980-000
- Area code: 18
- HDI (2010): 0.719 – high
- Website: Official website

Guaraçaí is a municipality in the state of São Paulo in Brazil. Its estimated population is of 8,290 inhabitants (as of 2020) in an area of 569.197 km^{2} (220 sq mi) and its elevation is of 440.22 m (1,444 ft) above the sea level.

The municipality contains 32.46% of the 9,044 hectares (22,350 acres) from the Aguapeí State Park, created in 1998.

== History ==
The municipality was created by state law in 1948.

Map of the state of São Paulo (1948).

== Media ==
In telecommunications, the city was served by Telecomunicações de São Paulo. In July 1998, this company was acquired by Telefónica, which adopted the Vivo brand in 2012. The company is currently an operator of cell phones, fixed lines, internet (fiber optics/4G) and television (satellite and cable).

== See also ==
- List of municipalities in São Paulo
- Interior of São Paulo
