= Engineer Souza Dias Dam =

Dam in Mato Grosso do Sul, Brazil

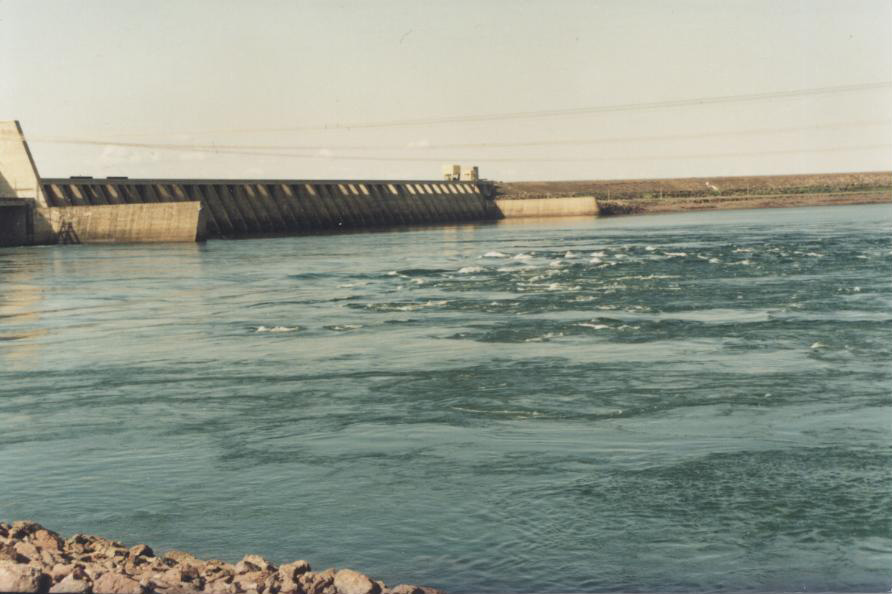

- Location within Brazil
- Official name: Engineer Souza Dias Hydroelectric Power Plant
- Location: Três Lagoas, MS, Brazil
- Coordinates: 20°46′40″S 51°37′45″W
- Opening date: 1968
- Owner: CESP

Dam and spillways
- Type of dam: Embankment, concrete portion
- Impounds: Paraná River
- Height: 53 m (174 ft)
- Length: 5,495 m (18,028 ft)
- Spillway type: Service, gate-controlled
- Spillway capacity: 44,696 m^{3}/s (1,578,400 cu ft/s)

Reservoir
- Creates: Engineer Souza Dias Reservoir
- Total capacity: 3.353 km^{3} (2,718,000 acre⋅ft)
- Catchment area: 470,000 km^{2} (180,000 sq mi)
- Surface area: 330 km^{2} (130 sq mi)

Power Station
- Commission date: 1969–1974
- Type: Conventional
- Turbines: 14 x Kaplan turbines
- Installed capacity: 1,551.2 MW (2,080,200 hp)

The Engineer Souza Dias Dam, formerly known as the Jupiá Dam, is an embankment dam on the Paraná River near Três Lagoas in Mato Grosso do Sul, Brazil. It was constructed for hydroelectric power production, flood control and navigation. Studies on the dam and power plant began in 1951 which recommended the dam along with the Ilha Solteira Dam. The dam was inaugurated in 1968 and its generators were commissioned between 1969 and 1974.

== Dam and reservoir ==
The Souza Dias Dam is a 53-metre (174 ft) high and 5,495-metre (18,028 ft) long combination concrete gravity and embankment dam. The concrete power plant, navigation lock and spillway section of the dam measures 1,040 metres (3,410 ft) long while the earth-fill embankments flanking the concrete section measure 2,070 metres (6,790 ft) long on the right and 2,385 metres (7,825 ft) long on the left. The reservoir created by the dam has a 3.353 cubic kilometres (2,718,000 acre⋅ft) capacity of which 900,000,000 cubic metres (730,000 acre⋅ft) is active or "useful" storage. The reservoir has a catchment area of 470,000 square kilometres (180,000 sq mi) and surface area of 330 square kilometres (130 sq mi). The dam's spillway contains 37 floodgates, each with a 1,208 cubic metres per second (42,700 cu ft/s) discharge capacity for a total discharge of 44,696 cubic metres per second (1,578,400 cu ft/s). The average long-term flow at the dam is 6,350 cubic metres per second (224,000 cu ft/s) and the record maximum flow was 28,943 cubic metres per second (1,022,100 cu ft/s) which was reached on October 2, 1983.

The dam's navigation lock is 210 metres (690 ft) long, 17 metres (56 ft) wide and affords transportation on the Paraná and Tietê Rivers. It was inaugurated January 1998.

== Power station ==
The dam's power station contains 14 x 110.8 megawatts (148,600 hp) generators that are powered by Kaplan turbines for a total installed capacity of 1,551.2 megawatts (2,080,200 hp). In addition, the power station contains two 5 megawatts (6,700 hp) service generators for powering the dam's facilities itself. Together, dam's generators are designed to discharge 6,440 cubic metres per second (227,000 cu ft/s) of water, bringing the total discharge capability of the dam to 50,130 cubic metres per second (1,770,000 cu ft/s) at a reservoir elevation of 280.5 metres (920 ft) above sea level.

== See also ==
- List of power stations in Brazil
