= Nova Independência =

- Municipality
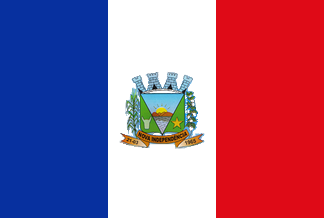
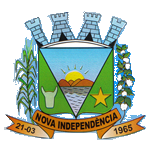
- Flag Coat of arms

- Location in São Paulo state

- Location in Brazil
- Coordinates: 21°6′14″S 51°29′24″W
- Country: Brazil
- Region: Southeast
- State: São Paulo

Area
  - Total: 265 km^{2} (102 sq mi)

Population (2020)
  - Total: 4,053
  - Density: 15.3/km^{2} (39.6/sq mi)
- Time zone: UTC−3 (BRT)

Nova Independência (Portuguese, 'New Independence') is a municipality in the state of São Paulo in Brazil. The population is 4,053 (2020 est.) in an area of 265 km^{2} (102 sq mi). The elevation is 316 m.

The municipality contains 21.6% of the 9,044-hectare (22,350-acre) Aguapeí State Park, created in 1998.

== Media ==
In telecommunications, the city was served by Companhia de Telecomunicações do Estado de São Paulo until 1973, when it began to be served by Telecomunicações de São Paulo. In July 1998, this company was acquired by Telefónica, which adopted the Vivo brand in 2012.

The company is currently an operator of cell phones, fixed lines, internet (fiber optics/4G) and television (satellite and cable).

== See also ==
- List of municipalities in São Paulo
- Interior of São Paulo
