= Flag of Junqueirópolis =

Flag of a Brazilian state

a bandeira de Junqueirópolis

The flag of Junqueirópolis (bandeira de Junqueirópolis) is the official flag of the municipality of Junqueirópolis in the western region of the state of São Paulo, Brazil. It was legally instituted on 30 May 1978.

The flag is sky blue with a white equilateral triangle in the center surrounding the municipal coat of arms. The blue represents the waterways of the region and the sky overhead. The white represents the desire to live and prosper peacefully.

The equilateral triangle represents the following triads:

- God, Country and Family
- Freedom, Equality and Fraternity
- Judiciary, Legislative and Executive government
- White people (a branca), Yellow people (amarela) and Black people (negra). In this case, amarela probably refers to índios but may also include the local Japanese Brazilian population and other people of Asian descent.
