= Paraná Miní River =

Coordinates: 29°5′9″S 59°24′21″W

Location
- Country: Argentina

The Paraná Miní River (Spanish: Río Paraná Miní) is an anabranch, or "secondary branch", and tributary of the Paraná River. It is located in the provinces of Santa Fe and Chaco, Argentina. In Chaco Province the Paraná Miní receives several relatively small tributaries, including the Tapenagá River, Palometa River, and Salado River (one of many Paraná tributaries named Salado).

There are several branches of the Paraná River named Paraná Miní, notably one in Corrientes Province.

== See also ==
- List of rivers of Argentina
