= Alto Paraíso, Paraná =

Coordinates: 23°30′28″S 53°43′40″W

- Municipality
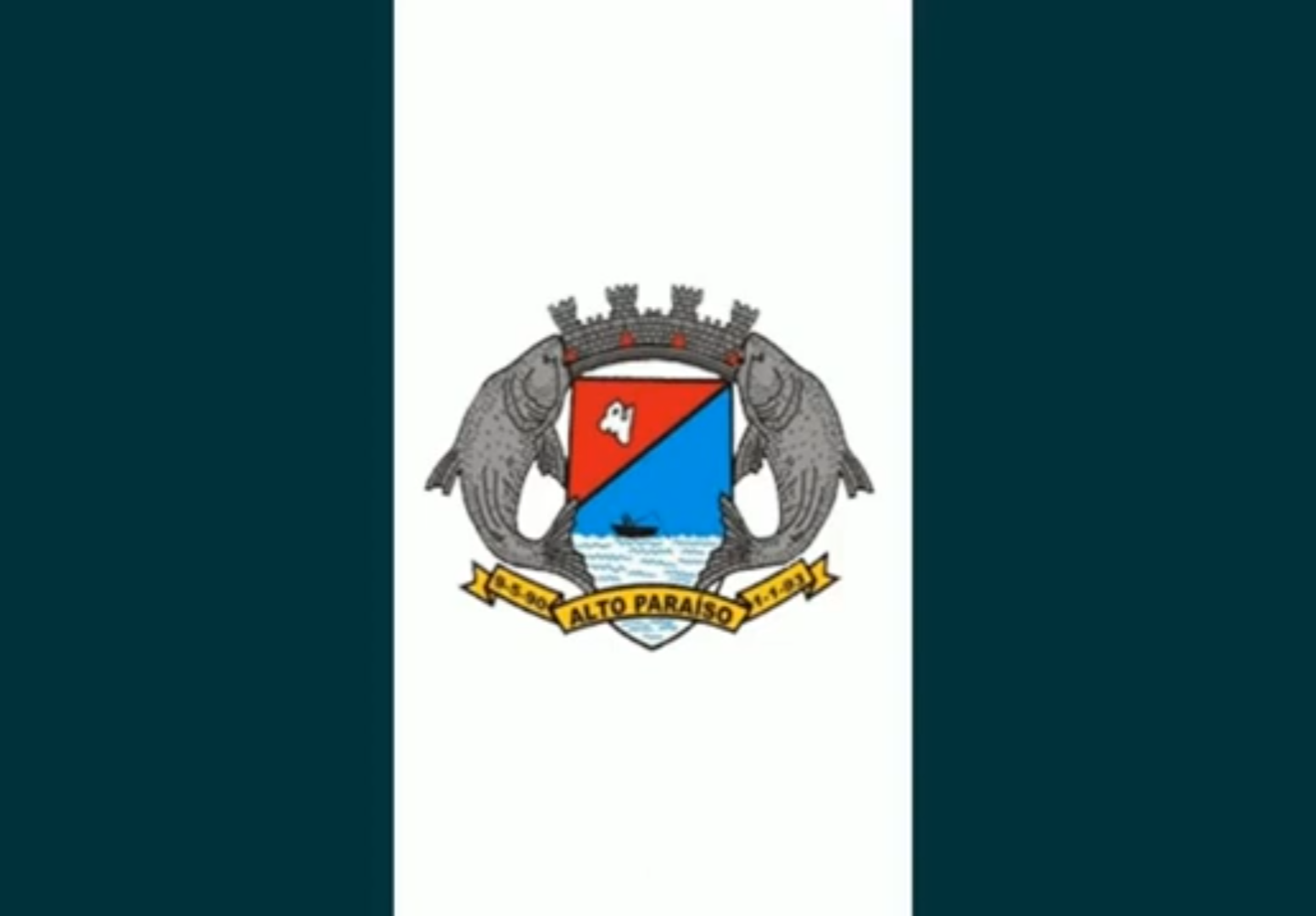
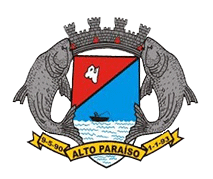
- Flag Coat of arms
- Interactive map of Alto Paraíso, Paraná
- Country: Brazil
- Region: Southern
- State: Paraná
- Mesoregion: Noroeste Paranaense

Population (2010)
  - Total: 3,206
- Time zone: UTC−3 (BRT)

Alto Paraíso, Paraná is a municipality in the state of Paraná in the Southern Region of Brazil.

== See also ==
- List of municipalities in Paraná
