= Tapenagá River =

Coordinates: 28°4′46″S 59°9′18″W

Location
- Country: Argentina

Physical characteristics
- Mouth
  - location: Paraná Miní River

The Tapenagá River (Spanish, Río Tapenagá) is a river of Chaco Province and Santa Fe Province, Argentina. It is a tributary of the Paraná Miní River.

== See also ==
- List of rivers of Argentina
