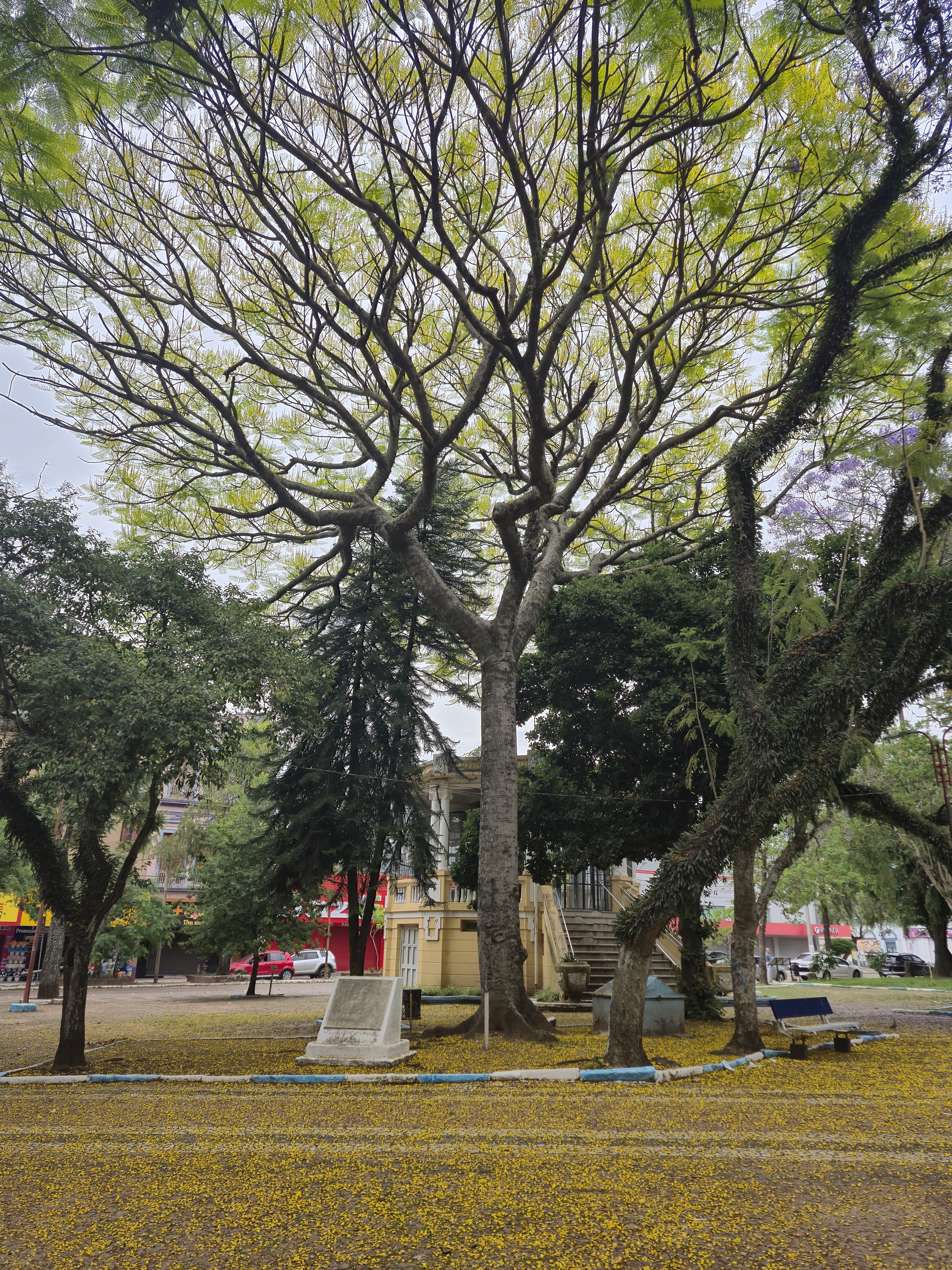
- Tree with fallen flowers

Scientific classification
- Kingdom: Plantae
- Clade: Embryophytes
- Clade: Tracheophytes
- Clade: Spermatophytes
- Clade: Angiosperms
- Clade: Eudicots
- Clade: Rosids
- Order: Fabales
- Family: Fabaceae
- Subfamily: Caesalpinioideae
- Genus: Schizolobium; Vogel
- Species: S. parahyba

Binomial name
- Schizolobium parahyba (Vell.) S.F.Blake

Synonyms
- Caesalpinia parahyba Allemão; Cassia parahyba Vell.; Schizolobium amazonicum Huber ex Ducke; Schizolobium excelsum Vogel); Schizolobium excelsum var. amazonicum (Huber ex Ducke) Ducke ex L.O.Williams; Schizolobium glutinosum Tul.; Schizolobium kellermanii Pittier; Schizolobium parahyba var. amazonicum (Huber ex Ducke) Barneby

= Schizolobium =

Species of legume

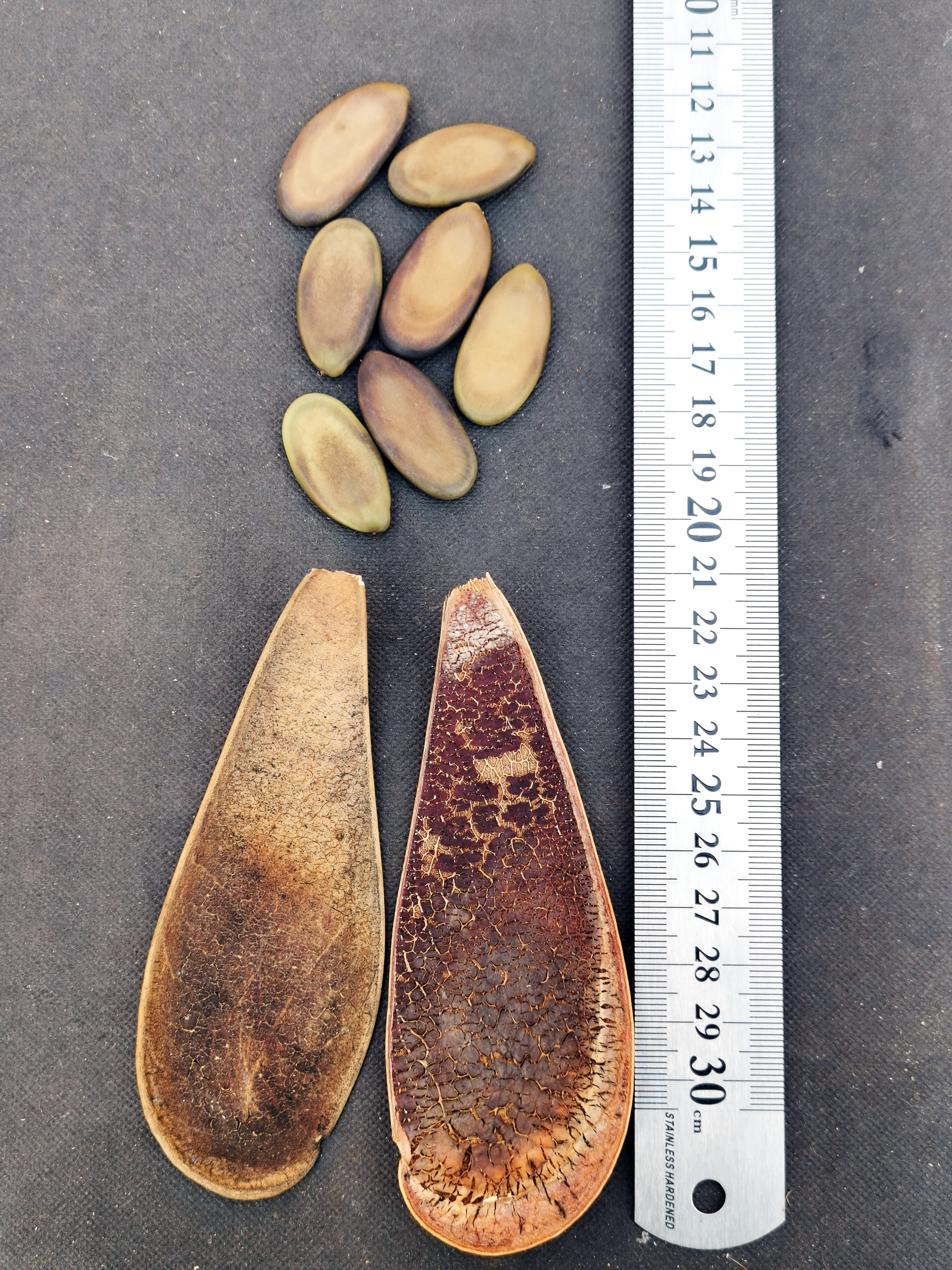
Dehisced pod and seeds

Schizolobium parahyba, the Brazilian firetree, or Brazilian fern tree, is a species of tree from tropical America. It is the sole species in genus Schizolobium. It is notable for its fast growth (up to 3 meters per year). Under optimal conditions it may reach 30 meters high in only five years, which would make it one of the fastest growing trees ever (an average growth of 6 meters per year).

The tree is locally known by many names, including guapuruvu, guapiruvu, bacurubu, ficheira ("token tree"), faveira ("fava tree"), pau-de-vintém ("penny-wood"), pau-de-tamanco ("clog-wood"), umbela, and parica. It was first described by J. M. C. Vellozo in 1825 under the name Cassia parahyba. The species name likely refers to the Paraíba River in Southeast Brazil.

== Description ==
The mature tree typically has a straight trunk, up to 40 meters tall and 80 cm wide, that branches out only near the top. The bark is smooth and gray-green except by the scars left by fallen leaves. The leaves are bipinnate, a metre or more in length, with a green stem and 30–50 opposite pinnae, each with 40–60 leaflets 2–3 cm long; they are clustered near the end of the branches, and fall off completely in the dry season. Young individuals, often unbranched and with leaves over 2 meters long, may be mistaken for ferns or palms. At the base of each leaf is a large pulvinus.

The numerous bright yellow nectar-producing flowers, about 3.5 cm in diameter, bloom from October through December in the Southern Hemisphere, after the leaves have fallen off. In Southeast Brazil they are visited chiefly by bees Centris labrosa, Centris varia, Xylocopa frontalis and Megachille species. The fruits ripen between April and June. Each fruit is a tadpole-like pod about 10 cm long, containing a single oval seed, smooth and brown.

== Diffusion ==
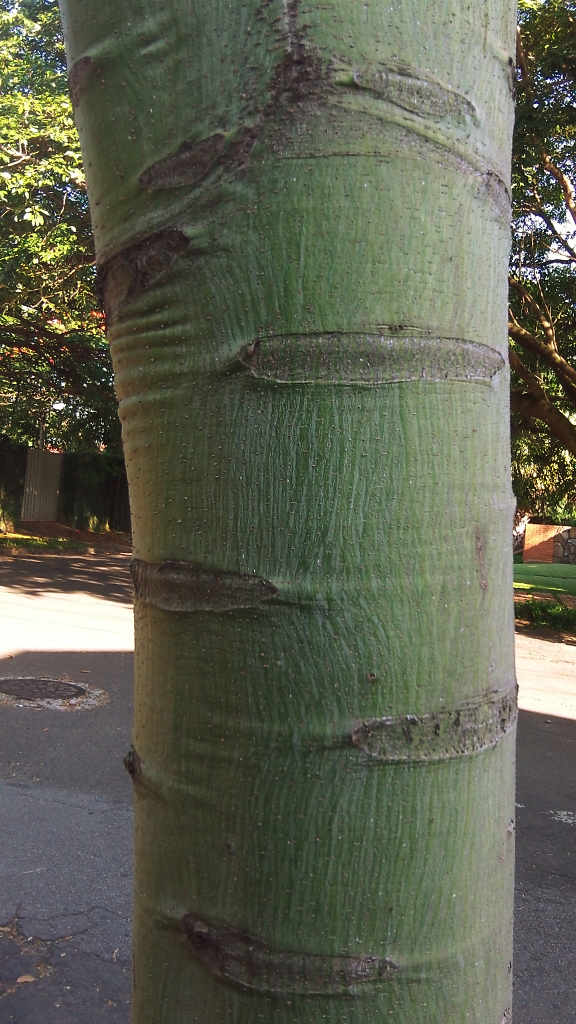
Trunk of a young tree showing leaf-stalk scars.

The native range spans from Central America to southern Brazil. It is sun-loving and prefers open and semi-open areas; it is quite rare in densely forested areas. It is an example of disjunct distribution, being found, according to Correa, in Central America and the Atlantic Rainforest of southern Brazil, but not in the Amazon.

== Uses ==
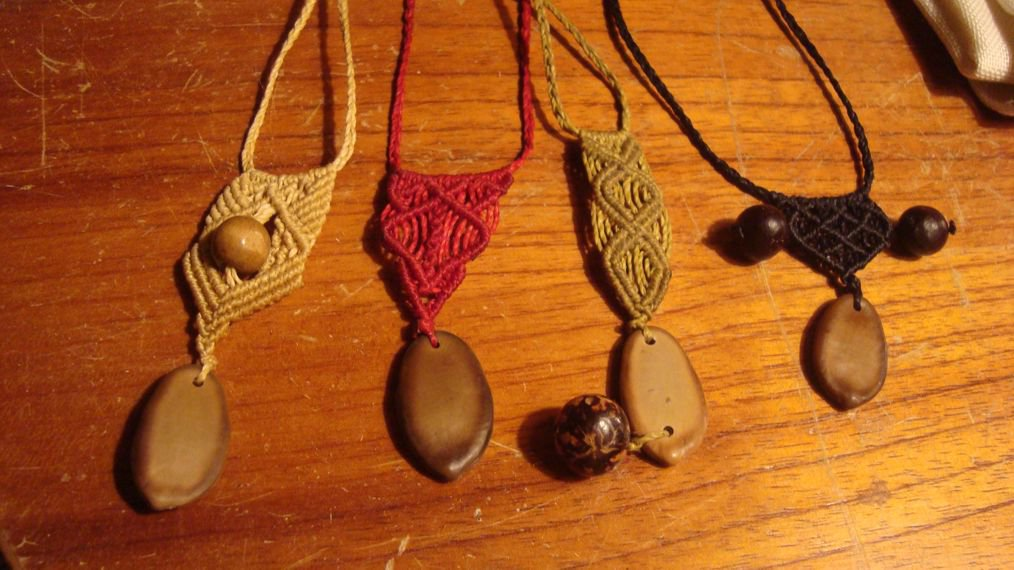
Necklaces made from yvapuruvu seeds in Tobati (Paraguay).

The wood is odorless, straw-colored, soft and light (density 0.32 to 0.39 g/cm^{3}, increasing with age). Formerly used for dugout canoes, it is now used for toys, boxes, shoe heels, the inner layers of laminated wood, and paper. It is easily cultivated, yielding 600 m^{3} of wood per hectare after 10 years.

The leaves contain water-soluble substances that act as antidotes to the bites of Bothrops snakes.

The seeds are used traditionally as beads and buttons.
