= Três Irmãos Dam =

- Location within Brazil
- Official name: Barragem Três Irmãos
- Country: Brazil
- Location: Pereira Barreto, São Paulo
- Coordinates: 20°39′56.29″S 51°18′5.19″W
- Purpose: Power, navigation
- Status: Operational
- Opening date: 1991; 35 years ago

Dam and spillways
- Type of dam: Embankment with gravity sections
- Impounds: Tietê River
- Height: 82 m (269 ft)
- Length: 3,640 m (11,940 ft)

Reservoir
- Creates: Três Irmãos Reservoir
- Total capacity: 13,373,000,000 m^{3} (10,842,000 acre⋅ft)
- Active capacity: 3,450,000,000 m^{3} (2,800,000 acre⋅ft)
- Inactive capacity: 9,923,000,000 m^{3} (8,045,000 acre⋅ft)
- Catchment area: 699,000 km^{2} (270,000 sq mi)
- Surface area: 785 km^{2} (303 sq mi)
- Normal elevation: 328 m (1,076 ft)

Power Station
- Operator: Companhia Energética de São Paulo (CESP)
- Commission date: 1993-1999
- Type: Conventional
- Turbines: 5 x 161.5 MW (216,600 hp) Francis-type
- Installed capacity: 807.5 MW (1,082,900 hp)

The Três Irmãos Dam is an embankment dam with gravity sections on the Tietê River in Pereira Barreto of São Paulo state in Brazil. The dam is about 28 kilometres (17 mi) upstream of the river's confluence with the Paraná River. It supports the largest hydroelectric power station on the river with an installed capacity of 807.5 megawatts (1,082,900 hp). The dam was completed in 1991 and the five 161.5 megawatts (216,600 hp) Francis turbine-generators were commissioned between November 1993 and January 1999. It is owned and operated by Companhia Energética de São Paulo (CESP). The dam also provides for navigation with two ship locks.
