= Aguapeí River (São Paulo) =

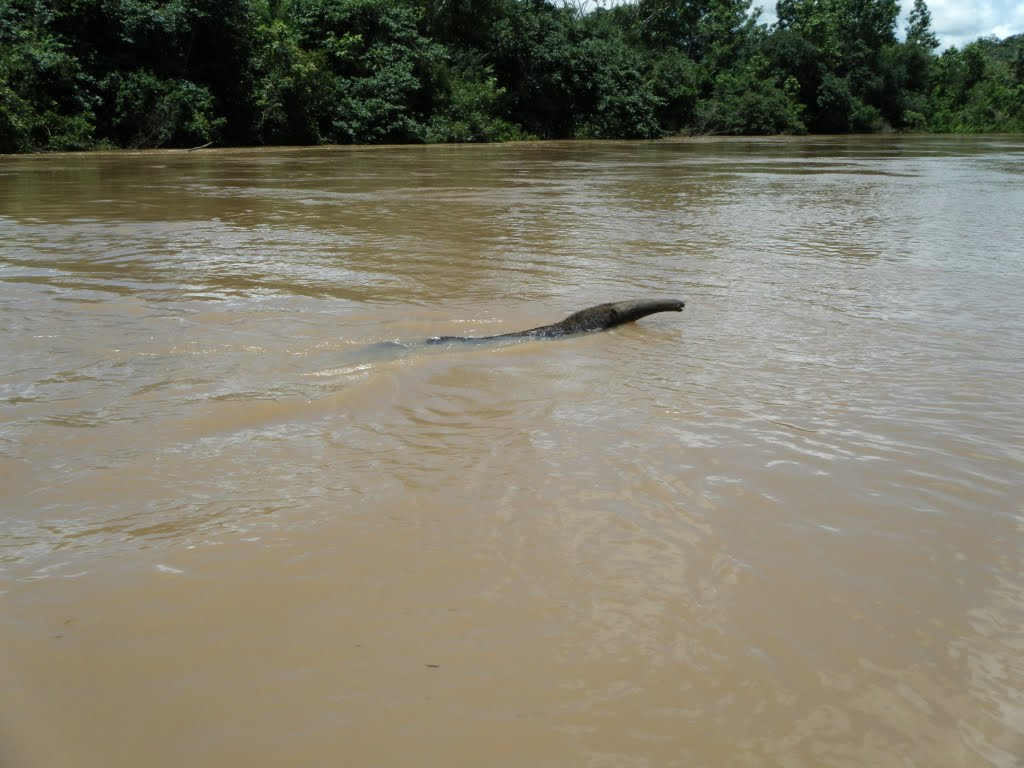
- Giant anteater in the river

- Location within Brazil
- Native name: Rio Aguapeí (Portuguese)

Location
- Country: Brazil

Physical characteristics
- Source
  - location: São Paulo state
- Mouth
  - coordinates: 21.050759°S 51.766927°W

Basin features
- River system: Paraná River

The Aguapeí River (Portuguese: Rio Aguapeí) is a river of São Paulo state in southeastern Brazil. It is a left tributary of the Paraná River.

The lower reaches of the Aguapeí River flow through the Aguapeí State Park, created in 1998, which is about 10 kilometres (6.2 mi) upstream from the point where the Aguapeí the Paraná River. The park contains large areas of floodplain, and is flooded in the rainy season when the Aguapeí overflows its banks. The mouth of the river is protected by the 8,885 hectares (21,960 acres) Mouth of the Aguapeí Private Natural Heritage Reserve, created in 2010.

== See also ==
- List of rivers of São Paulo

== Sources ==
- Covas, Bruno (2013), "Reserva Particular do Patrimônio Natural Foz do Rio Aguapeí", Anuário das Reservas Particulares do Patrimônio Natural Instituídas pela Secretaria do Meio Ambiente do Estado de São Paulo (PDF) (in Portuguese), Secretario do Meio Ambiente do Estado de São Paulo, archived from the original (PDF) on 2016-02-20
- PES do Aguapeí (in Portuguese), ISA: Instituto Socioambiental
