= Ilha Solteira Dam =

Dam in São Paulo, Brazil

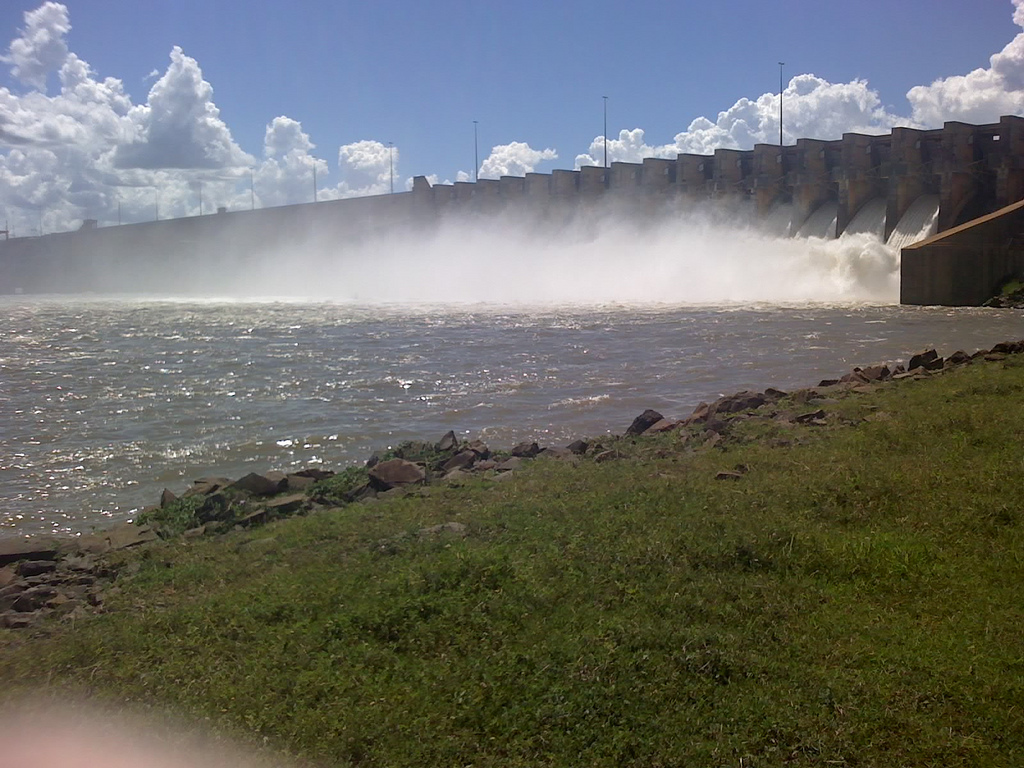
- Ilha Solteira Dam discharging water through its spillway

- Location within Brazil
- Location: Ilha Solteira, São Paulo, Brazil
- Coordinates: 20°22′58″S 51°21′44″W
- Construction began: 1967
- Opening date: 1973
- Owner: CESP

Dam and spillways
- Type of dam: Embankment, concrete portion
- Impounds: Paraná River
- Height: 76 m (249 ft)
- Length: 5.6 km (3.5 mi)
- Spillway type: Service, gate-controlled
- Spillway capacity: 40,000 m^{3}/s (1,400,000 cu ft/s)

Reservoir
- Creates: Ilha Solteira Reservoir
- Total capacity: 21.2 km^{3} (17,200,000 acre⋅ft)
- Surface area: 1,195 km^{2} (461 sq mi)

Power Station
- Commission date: 1973–1978
- Type: Conventional
- Turbines: 20 x Francis turbines
- Installed capacity: 3,444 MW (4,618,000 hp)
- Annual generation: 17.9 TWh (64 PJ) (2005)

The Ilha Solteira Dam is an embankment dam on the Paraná River near Ilha Solteira in São Paulo, Brazil. It was constructed between 1967 and 1973 for hydroelectric power production, flood control and navigation. After launch of last generator in 1978, HPP was the 6th largest in the world.

The dam supports hydroelectric power plant with an installed capacity of 3,444 megawatts (4,618,000 hp). The power plant contains 20 generators with Francis turbines that are broken down into three ratings: 11 X 170 megawatts (230,000 hp), 5 X 174 megawatts (233,000 hp) and 4 X 176 megawatts (236,000 hp). In 2005, the power plant produced 17.9 TWh of electricity.

== See also ==
- List of power stations in Brazil
