= Paraná River =

River in South America

Paraná River Rio Paraná
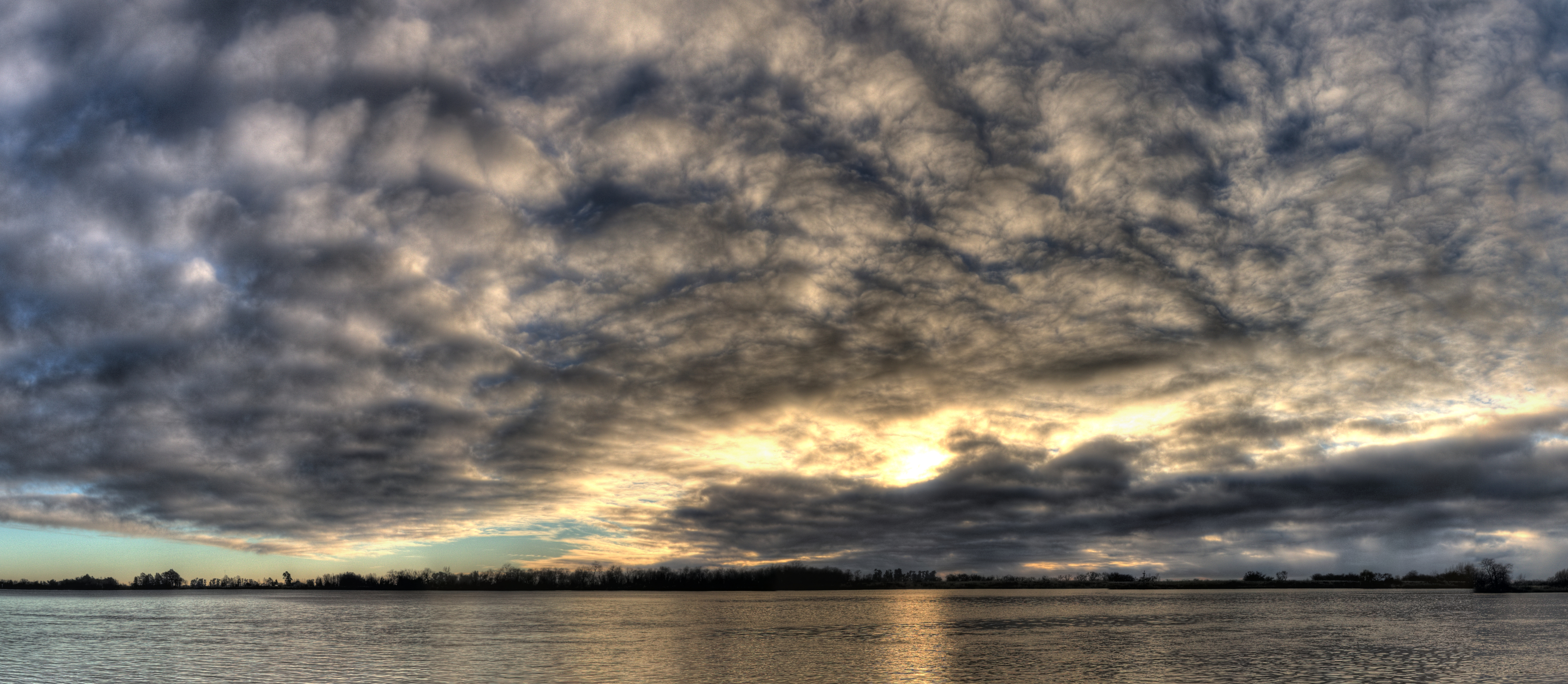
- Paraná River seen from Zárate, Buenos Aires Province, Argentina

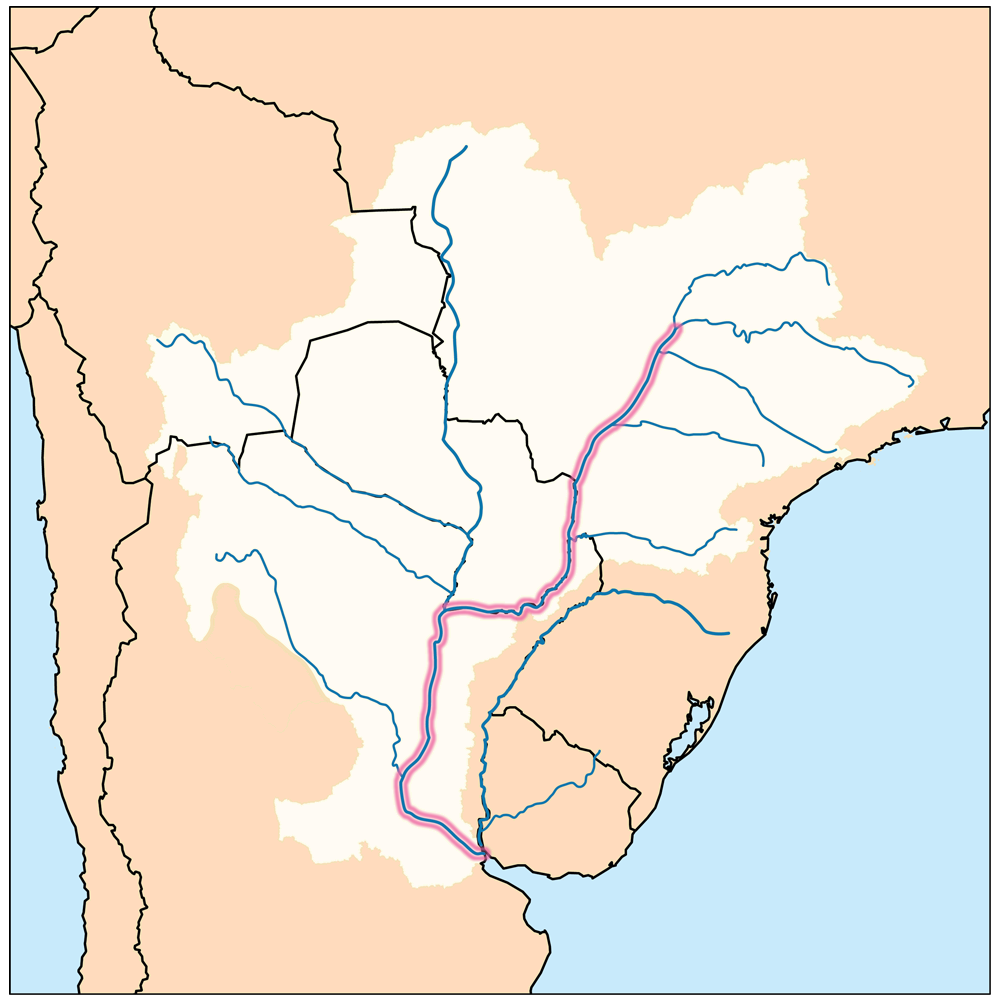
- Map of the Paraná River basin, showing the Paraná River in highlight
- Native name: Parana (Guarani)

Location
- Countries: Argentina; Brazil; Paraguay
- Region: South America

Physical characteristics
- Source: Paranaíba
  - location: Rio Paranaíba, Minas Gerais, Brazil
  - coordinates: 19°13′21″S 46°10′28″W
  - elevation: 1,148 m (3,766 ft)
- 2nd source: Rio Grande
  - location: Bocaina de Minas, Minas Gerais, Brazil
  - coordinates: 22°9′56″S 44°23′38″W
- Source confluence: Paranaíba and Rio Grande
  - coordinates: 20°5′12″S 51°0′2″W
- Mouth: Río de la Plata
  - location: Atlantic Ocean, Argentina, Uruguay
  - coordinates: 34°0′5″S 58°23′37″W
  - elevation: 0 m (0 ft)
- Length: 2,546 km (1,582 mi) (Paraná with Paranaíba 3,740 km, Paraná with Rio Grande 4,001 km) (Río de la Plata–Paraná–Rio Grande 4,880 km)
- Basin size: 2,630,667 km^{2} (1,015,706 mi^{2})
- Discharge
  - location: Paraná Delta
  - average: (Period 1971–2010)19,706 m^{3}/s (695,900 cu ft/s) (17,290 m^{3}/s (611,000 cu ft/s)–21,100 m^{3}/s (750,000 cu ft/s))
  - minimum: 2,450 m^{3}/s (87,000 cu ft/s)
  - maximum: 65,000 m^{3}/s (2,300,000 cu ft/s)
- Discharge
  - location: Corrientes
  - average: (Period 1971–2010)18,979 m^{3}/s (670,200 cu ft/s) (Period: 1904–2022)17,179.11 m^{3}/s (606,675 cu ft/s)
- Discharge
  - location: Itatí
  - average: (Period 1971–2010)13,916 m^{3}/s (491,400 cu ft/s)
- Discharge
  - location: Itaipú
  - average: (Period 1971–2010)11,746 m^{3}/s (414,800 cu ft/s) (Period: 1981–2022) 10,284 m^{3}/s (363,200 cu ft/s)
- Discharge
  - location: Porto Primavera
  - average: (Period 1971–2010)7,938 m^{3}/s (280,300 cu ft/s)

Basin features
- Progression: Río de la Plata → Atlantic Ocean
- River system: Río de la Plata
- Tributaries
  - left: Gualeguay, Iguaçu, Piquiri, Ivaí, Paranapanema, Tietê, Rio Grande
  - right: Carcarañá, Salado, Paraguay, Ivinhema, Pardo, Verde, Sucuriú, Paranaiba

The Paraná River (Portuguese: Rio Paraná [ˈʁi.u paɾɐˈna]; Spanish: Río Paraná [ˈri.o paɾaˈna]; Guarani: Ysyry Parana) is a river in south-central South America, running through Brazil, Paraguay, and Argentina for some 4,880 kilometres (3,030 mi). Among South American rivers, it is second in length only to the Amazon River. It merges with the Paraguay River and then farther downstream with the Uruguay River to form the Río de la Plata and empties into the Atlantic Ocean.

The first European to go up the Paraná River was the Venetian explorer Sebastian Cabot, in 1526, while working for Spain.

A drought hit the river in 2021, causing a 77-year low.

== Etymology ==
In eastern South America there are "an immense number of river names containing the element para- or parana-", from Guarani language words meaning "river" or "sea"; attempts to derive a more precise meaning for the name of this, the largest of them, e.g. "kin of the sea", have been discounted.

== Course ==
The course is formed at the confluence of the Paranaiba and Rio Grande rivers in southern Brazil. From the confluence the river flows in a generally southwestern direction for about 619 km (385 mi) before encountering the city of Saltos del Guaira, Paraguay. This was once the location of the Guaíra Falls (Sete Quedas waterfalls, where the Paraná fell over a series of seven cascades. This natural feature was said to rival the world-famous Iguazu Falls to the south. The falls were flooded, however, by the construction of the Itaipu Dam, a hydroelectric power plant that was built from 1973 to 1984, creating a massive, shallow reservoir behind it.

For approximately the next 200 km (120 mi), the Paraná flows southward and forms a natural boundary between Paraguay and Brazil until the confluence with the Iguazu River. After merging with the Iguazu, the Paraná becomes the natural border between Paraguay and Argentina. Overlooking the Paraná River from Encarnación, Paraguay, across the river, is downtown Posadas, Argentina.

The river continues its general southward course for about 468 km (291 mi) before making a gradual turn to the west for another 820 km (510 mi), and then encounters the Paraguay River, the largest tributary along the course of the river. Before this confluence, the river passes through a second major hydroelectric project, the Yacyretá Dam, a joint project between Paraguay and Argentina.

From the confluence with the Paraguay River, the Paraná again turns to the south for another approximately 820 km (510 mi) through Argentina, making a slow turn back to the east near the city of Rosario for the final stretch of less than 500 km (310 mi) before merging with the Uruguay River to form the Río de la Plata. This flows into the Atlantic Ocean. During the part of its course downstream from the city of Diamante, Entre Ríos, it splits into several arms and it forms the Paraná Delta.

== Tributaries ==
The main tributaries from the mouth:

Left tributary	Right tributary	Length (km)	Basin size (km^{2})	Average discharge (m^{3}/s)^{*}
Paraná Delta
	Luján	100	5,065.6	60.5
	Arroyo de La Cruz		1,057.2	12.9
	Areco	124	4,149.8	51.6
	Arrecifes	255	11,304.4	114.4
Gualeguay		375	22,716	237.9
Nogoyá		164	9,334.5	120
Arroyo Tiestos Grandes		210	2,070.6	12.2
	Arroyo Ramallo		1,175.2	10.6
	Arroyo Yaquarón		1,825.5	15.8
	Arroyo Pavón	90	2,611.7	21.2
	Arroyo Saladillo	145	3,144	20.6
	Carcaraña	240	48,746.5	81
	Río Salado del Norte	2,355	225,844.4	170
Lower Paraná
Arroyo de las Conchas		50	2,184	14.2
Arroyo Feliciano		198	8,341	76.9
Guayquiraró		158	9,701	90
Corriente (Aruhary)		500	26,872.9	336.2
	San Javier	250	2,948.4	16.4
	Arroyo El Rey		6,346.4	40
	Río Los Amores (São Jerônimo)	177	17,440.7	69.7
Santa Lucia		190	6,963.4	85.6
	Paraná Miní–Tapenaga	300	12,072.7	53.5
	Tacuari		7,034.6	39.1
Arroyo San Lourenzo			1,411.4	12.4
Empedrado			2,002.2	18.3
Riachuelo			2,921.9	26.2
	Negro (Chaco)	410	21,121.4	58.5
	Guaycurú	446	21,656.6	33.9
	Paraguay	2,695	1,137,190.9	5,070.2
	Yabebyry		1,955	30.31
	Arroyo Aguapey	60	1,809	35.06
	Tacuary		1,010	20.54
Arroyo Garupá		62	1,416	38.1
Arroyo Yabebiry		130.1	1,889.3	46.9
	Capiibari		978	12.2
	Pirapó		952	20.5
Arroyo Cuñapirú		67.6	525	11.3
	Pirajui	97	1,221	26.6
Arroyo Garuhapé			527.9	11.7
	Tembey	95	1,243	28.8
Arroyo Paranay Guazú		114.2	1,319.5	30.7
Arroyo Piray Guazú		69.5	2,141.5	63.9
Arroyo Piray Mini		88.5	1,476.6	50.7
	Yacuy Guazú		788	23.77
Arroyo Aguaray Guazú			873	27.8
	Ñacunday	150	2,541	82.74
Arroyo Urugua-i		150.5	2,533.7	96.3
	Monday	150	6,693	164.7
Iguaçu		1,320	67,537.3	1,836
	Acaray	160	9,681	233.7
	Limay		1,099.8	27.4
São Francisco Falço Braço Sul		73	1,706.3	53.7
	Itambey	115	1,805.3	39.5
São Francisco Verdadeiro		152	2,210.2	64.2
	Arroyo Pozuelo		572.2	15
	Carapa	150	2,678	44
Arroyo Guaçu			1,222.3	26.6
	Piratiy	80	1,545.6	22.4
Upper Paraná
Piquiri		665	24,156	606.5
	Iguatemi	300	8,409.3	99.2
	Maracaí		1,831.2	18.3
	Amambaí	340	10,094.6	101.6
Ivaí		798	36,587	733.4
	Laranjal		1,782	14.9
	Ivinheima	595	38,200	544.5
	Bahia		1,344	10.2
Paranapanema		929	101,738.7	1,198.4
	Samambaia		1,379.7	12.3
Santo Anastácio		102	2,132.4	15
	Pardo	600	39,419.4	529
	Taquaruçu		2,615.3	17.9
Rio do Peixe		380	10,195.4	84
Verde		500	22,470.7	185
Aguapeí		420	12,026.4	85.3
	Sucuriú	450	25,220	353.7
Tietê		1,150	72,168	937.2
São José dos Dourados		334.5	6,783	52.3
	Quiteria		2,384.9	29.2
Rio Grande		1,455	143,484	2,279
Paranaíba
	Aporé	200	6,965.3	109
Corrente			7,323.5	119
São Domingos (Arantes)			3,589.7	39.2
	Verde		11,768.2	192.1
	Claro	495.2	13,684.2	205.4
Ribeiro dos Patos			1,073.1	10.8
	Alegre		1,406.1	17.3
	Preto	127.3	2,302.6	29.9
	São Francisco		1,337.9	15.7
Tijuco		355	14,284	170.2
	Dos Bois	528	34,759	334
	Meia Ponte	471.6	12,370.5	154.8
Piedade			1,777.3	19.6
	Ribeiro Santa Maria		1,287.4	13.4
	Corumbá	567.5	34,071.4	417
Araguari		475	22,091	284
	Veríssimo	200	4,533.7	48.8
Jordão			921.8	10.6
Bagagem			1,375.4	15.9
Perdizes			1,265.4	14.7
Dourados			2,451.6	30.3
	São Marcos	466.7	12,049.7	141.4
	Verde		1,337.1	15.8
Ribeiro das Minas Vermelhas			889.1	12.1
Espirito Santo			1,035.1	13.7

^{*}Period: 1971–2000

== Uses ==
Together with its tributaries, the Rio Paraná forms a massive drainage basin that encompasses much of the south-central part of South America, essentially including all of Paraguay, much of southern Brazil, northern Argentina, and the south-eastern part of Bolivia. If the Uruguay River is counted as a tributary to the Paraná, this watershed extends to cover most of Uruguay as well. The volume of water flowing into the Atlantic Ocean through the Río de la Plata roughly equals the volume at the Mississippi River delta. This watershed contains a number of large cities, including São Paulo, Buenos Aires, Rosario, Asunción, Brasília, and La Plata.

The Paraná and its tributaries provide a source of income and daily sustenance for fishermen who live along its banks. Some of the species of fish (such as the surubí and the sábalo) are commercially important, and they are exploited for heavy internal consumption or for export. The Paraná River delta ranks as one of the world's greatest bird-watching destinations.

Much of the length of the Paraná is navigable, as part of the Paraná–Paraguay Waterway and the Tietê–Paraná Waterway. The river serves as an important waterway linking inland cities in Argentina and Paraguay with the ocean, providing deepwater ports in some of these cities.

The Yacyretá Dam and Itaipu Dam hydroelectric power plants have made the small, largely undeveloped nation of Paraguay the world's largest exporter of hydroelectric power. However, these have blocked ship havigation to cities further upstream. Also, the massive reservoirs have caused a number of problems for people living along the river, most notably the poorer merchants and residents in the low-lying areas of Encarnación, a major city on the southern border of Paraguay. River levels rose dramatically upon completion of the dam, flooding out large sections of the city's lower areas.

Due to its use for oceangoing ships, measurements of the water tables extend back to 1904. The data correlates with the Sun's solar cycle.

== Navigation rights ==
The immediate background to the 1966 dispute over navigation rights included the fact that Argentina wanted to build a bridge across the Paraná River, either near Asunción or at some point further south. Paraguay were not in favour and would do nothing to facilitate it unless the navigation issue was resolved. Argentina was also actively seeking an agreement to develop a major hydroelectric facility at the Apipé Rapids. Paraguay, meanwhile, had already implemented the Acaray Dam project, whose output was sufficient to meet Paraguay's energy requirements for the next ten to fifteen years, with a surplus available for export to Brazil and Argentina. The bilateral agreement between Argentina and Paraguay for the construction of a bridge over the river was signed in October 1964.

In late 1965, Paraguay had offered a draft treaty to Argentina. According to the US ambassador of the time, Wiliam P Snow, the Paraguayan proposal, although short on detail, would be well received by Argentina who would be pleased to see Paraguay directing its aggression mainly towards Brazil as a result.

The agreement on navigation rights, endorsing free navigation on the river and requiring that each nation treat the other's vessels as its own, was signed in January 1973.

== Gallery ==
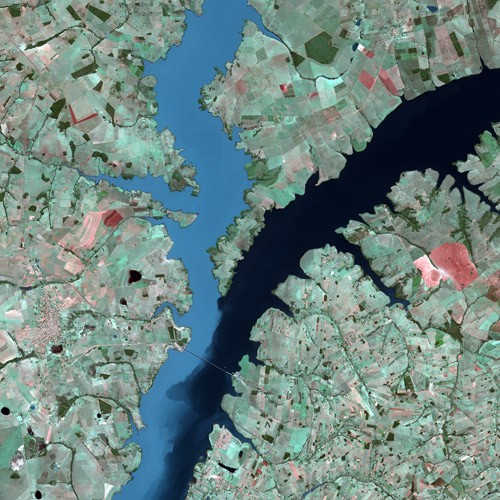
Paraná River source at the border of the states of São Paulo, Mato Grosso do Sul and Minas Gerais, in Brazil.

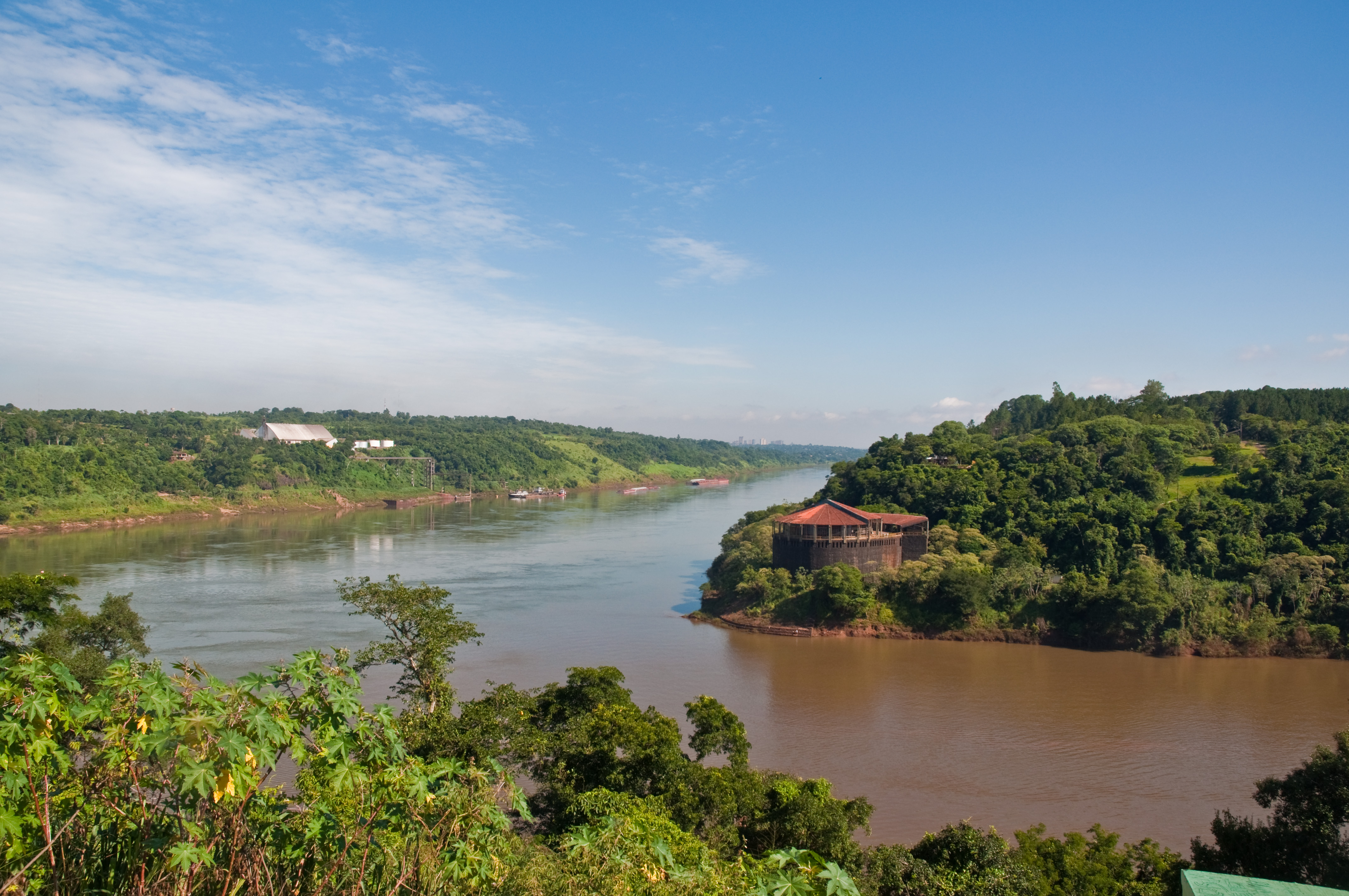
Confluence of the Iguazu and Parana rivers. The Triple frontier is a bit further in the background center: On the left is Paraguay, on the right Brazil, taken from Argentina.

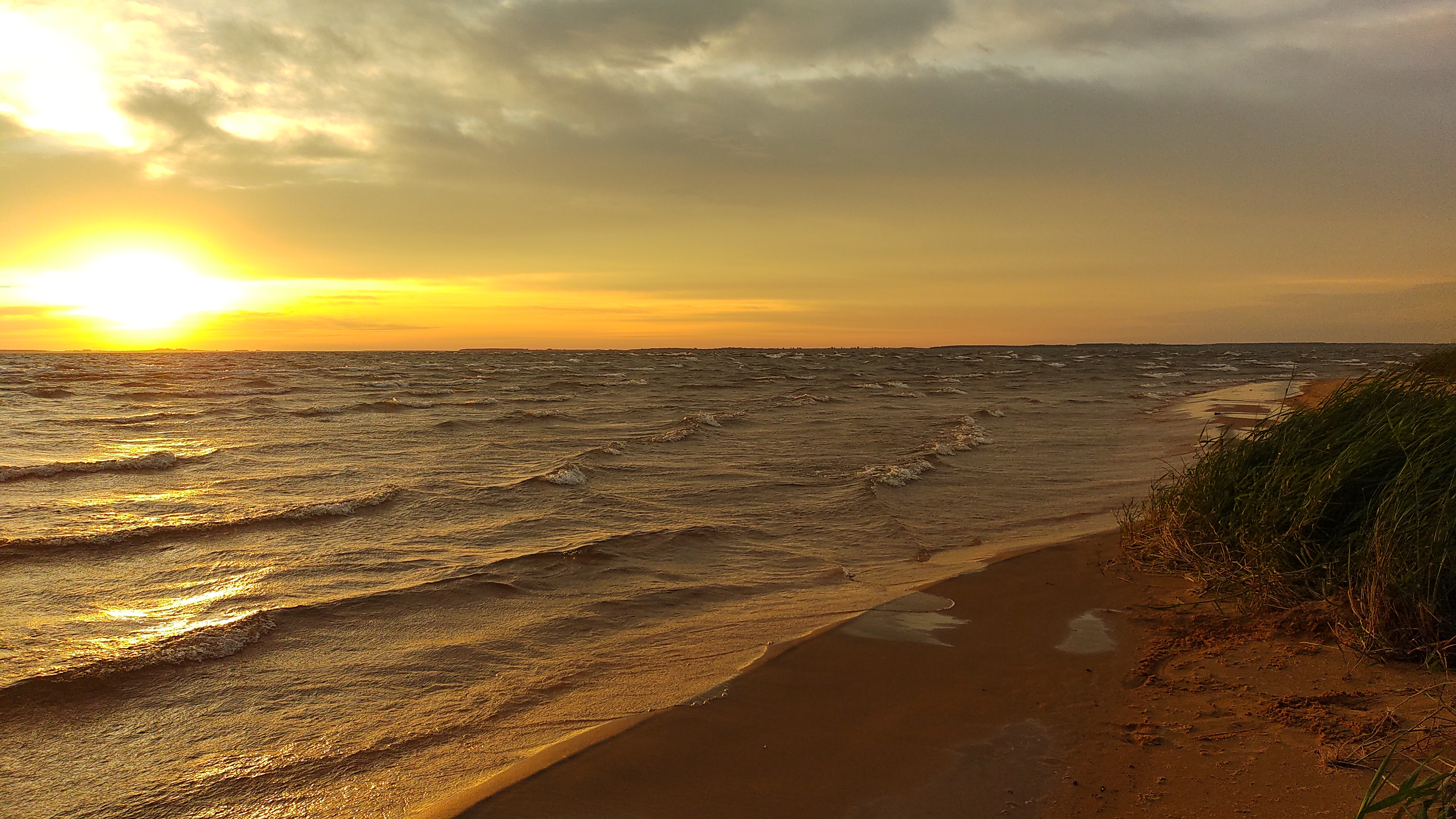
Sunrise over the Paraná River at San Cosme y Damián Dunes, Paraguay

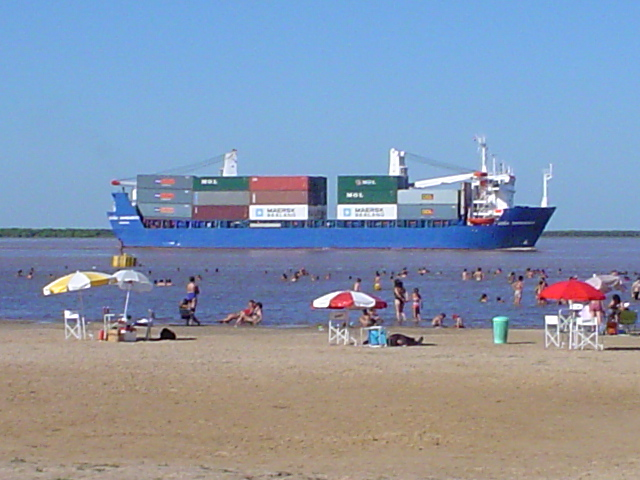
Container ship, traveling downstream by the city of Ramallo, Argentina

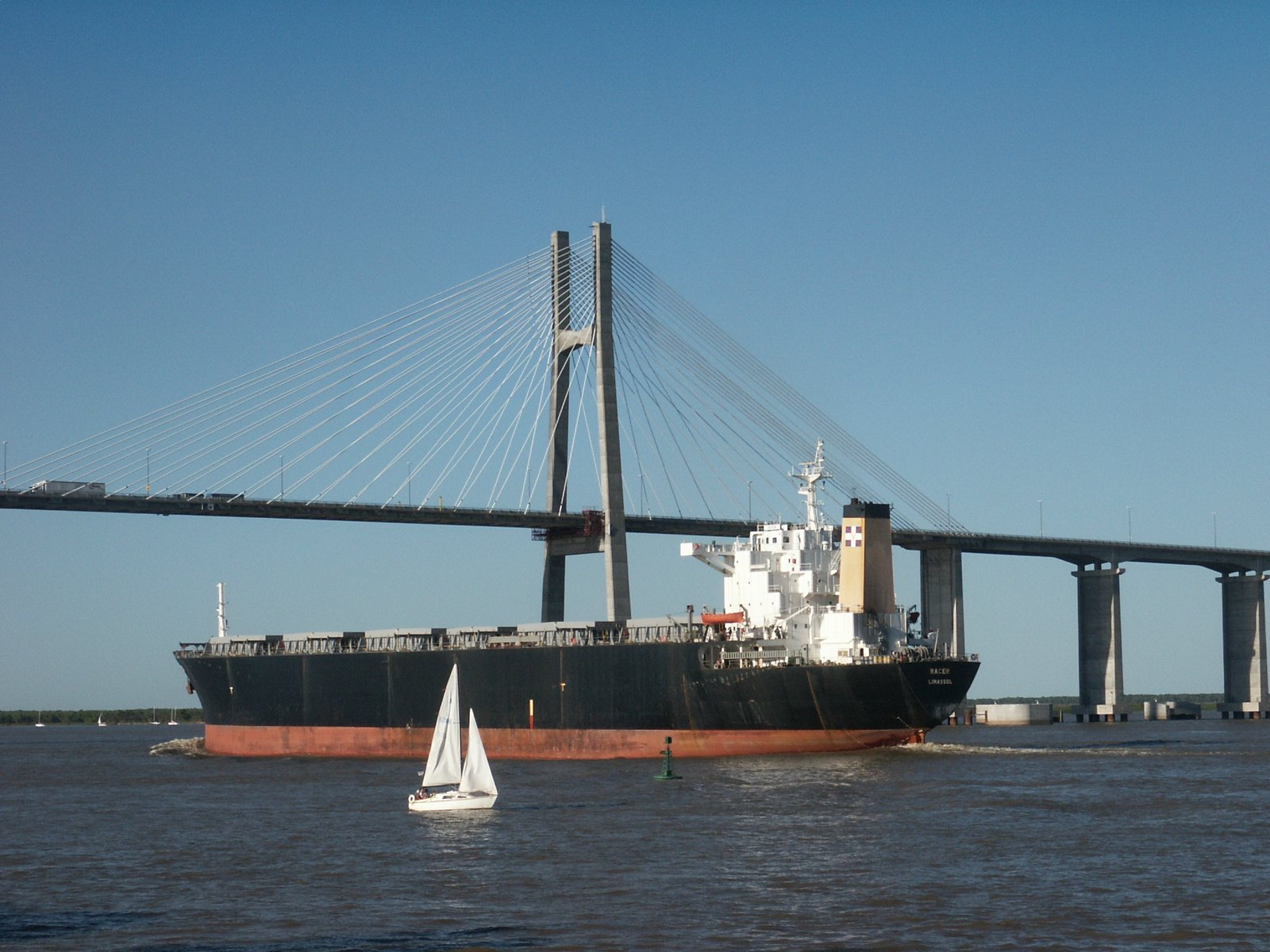
The Rosario-Victoria Bridge

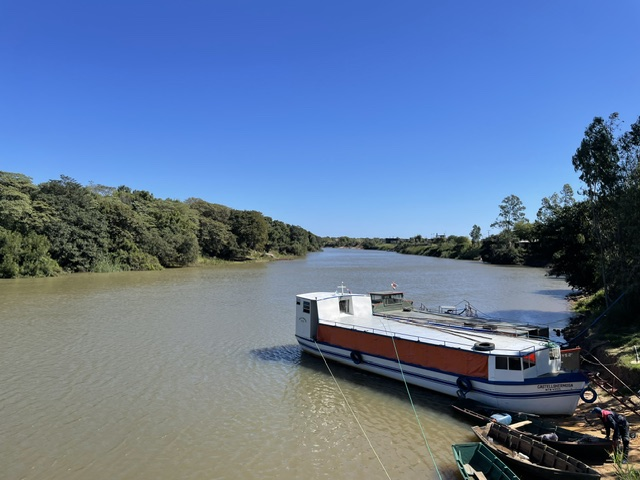
Ship docked at Itá Corá, Paraguay

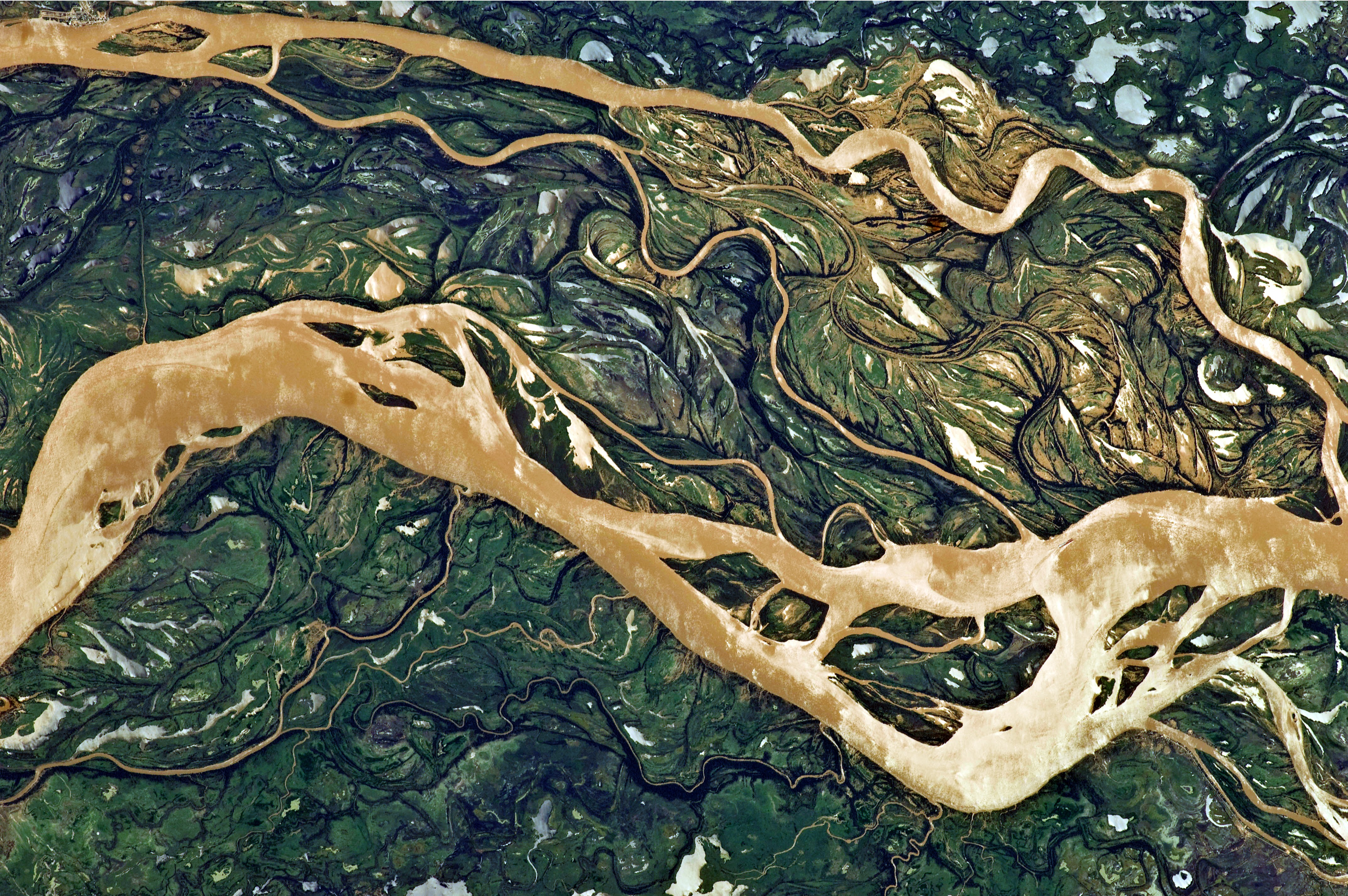
Astronaut's photo showing a 29-kilometre (18 mi) stretch of the Paraná, just downstream from Goya, Argentina

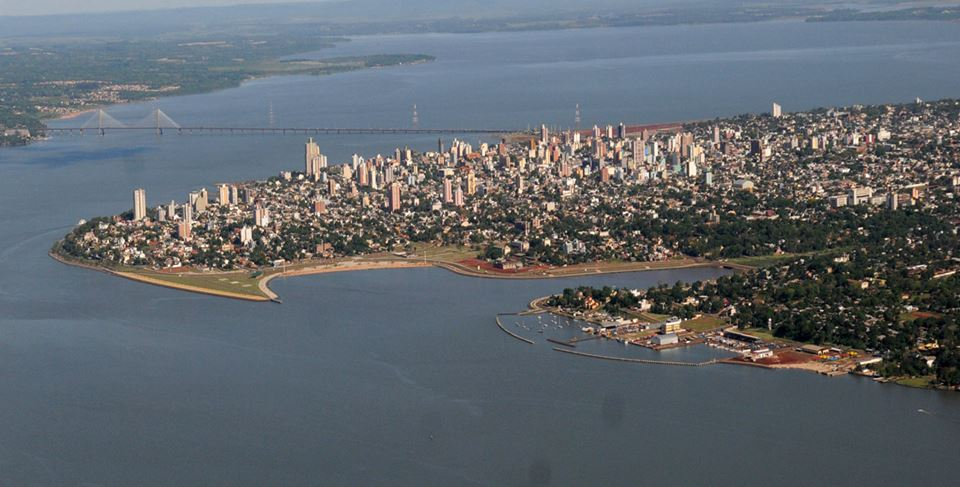
Parana river in Posadas, Argentina

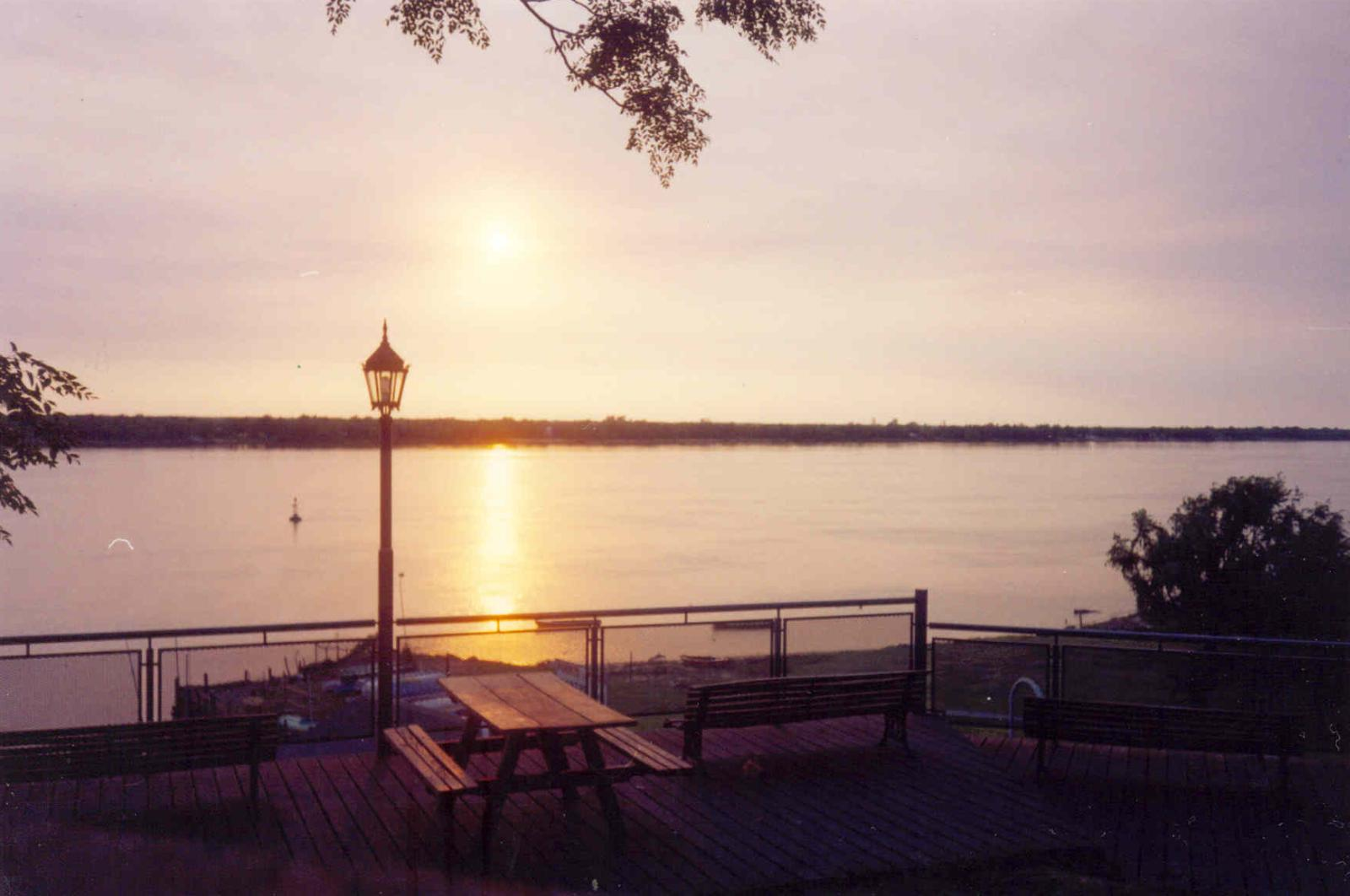
The sun rising over the Paraná River, from northeast of Rosario, Argentina

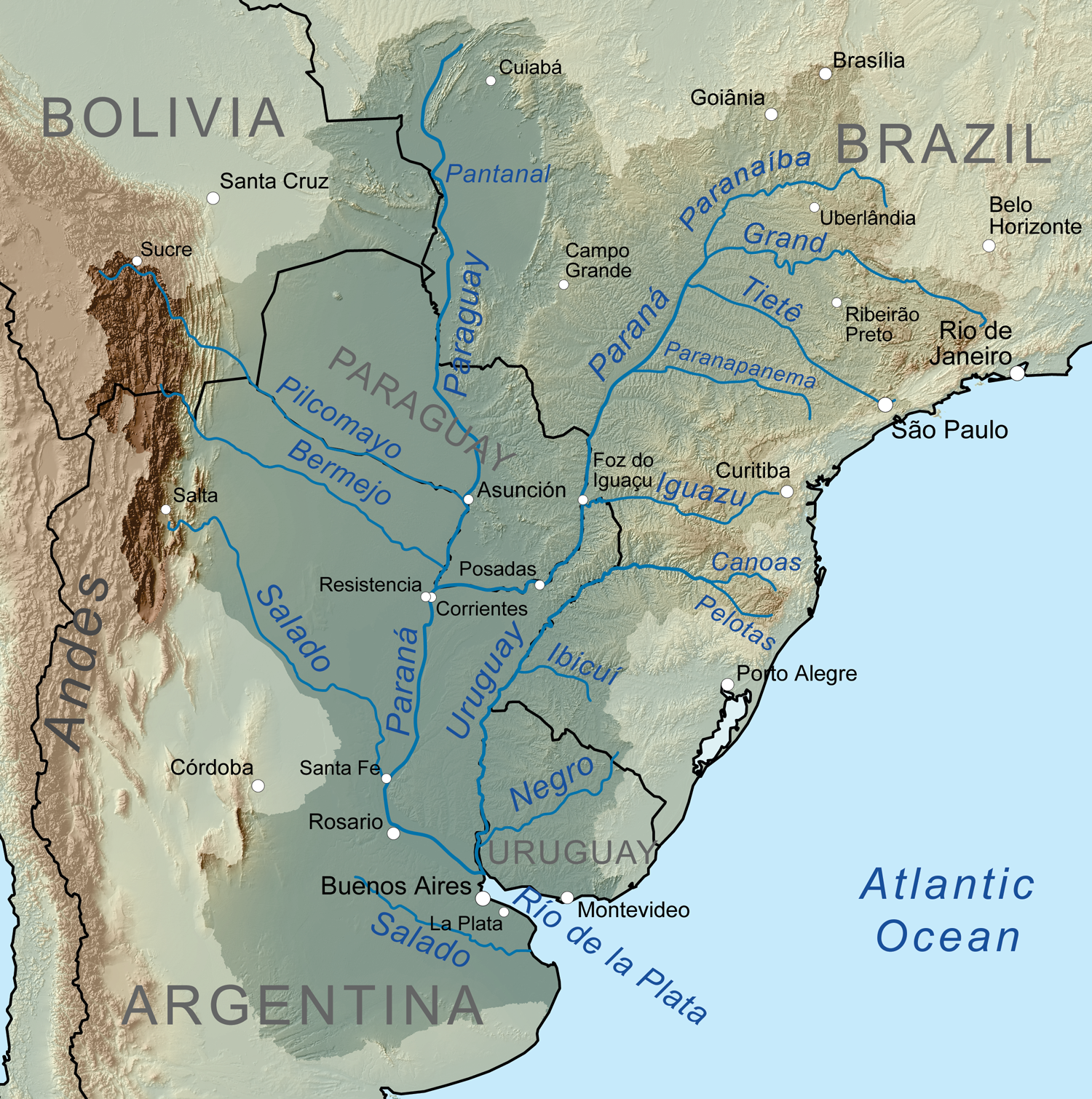
Map of the Rio de la Plata Basin showing the Paraná River and its major tributaries

== Links across the Paraná ==
The course of the Paraná is crossed by the following bridges, beginning upstream:

Crossing	Location	Built	Carries	Coordinates
Brazil
Rollemberg–Vuolo Road–Railway Bridge	Aparecida do Taboado-Rubineia	1998		20°06′17.9″S 51°00′32.4″W
Ilha Solteira Dam	Selvíria-Ilha Solteira	1973		20°22′54.2″S 51°21′59.7″W
Engineer Souza Dias Dam	Três Lagoas-Castilho	1968	BR-262	20°46′44.7″S 51°37′49.3″W
Paulicéia-Brasilândia Bridge	Brasilândia-Pauliceia	2009	BR-158	21°16′08.4″S 51°51′18.8″W
Hélio Serejo (Maurício Joppert) Bridge	Bataguassu-Presidente Epitácio	1964	BR-267	21°45′12.1″S 52°11′05.6″W
Sérgio Motta (Porto Primavera) Dam	Rosana	1999		22°28′30.5″S 52°57′29.6″W
Porto Camargo Bridge	Alto Paraíso		BR-487	23°22′24.5″S 53°46′08.3″W
Ayrton Senna Bridge	Mundo Novo-Guaíra	1998	BR-163	24°03′31″S 54°15′28.6″W
Brazil-Paraguay
Friendship Bridge	Ciudad del Este-Foz do Iguaçu	1965	PY02-BR-277	25°30′33.5″S 54°36′03.3″W
Integration Bridge	Presidente Franco-Foz do Iguaçu	2023		25°35′19″S 54°35′37″W
Paraguay-Argentina
San Roque González de Santa Cruz Bridge	Encarnación-Posadas	1990		27°22′09.3″S 55°51′43.3″W
Yacyretá Dam	Ayolas-Ituzaingó	1994		27°28′58.5″S 56°44′19.5″W
Argentina
General Manuel Belgrano Bridge	Resistencia-Corrientes	1973	National Route 16	27°28′12.3″S 58°51′35.1″W
Second Resistencia-Corrientes Bridge	Resistencia-Corrientes	Planned		
Reconquista-Goya Bridge	Reconquista-Goya	Planned		
Raúl Uranga - Carlos Sylvestre Begnis Subfluvial Tunnel	Santa Fe-Paraná	1969	National Route 168	31°42′08.7″S 60°30′12.6″W
Second Santa Fe-Paraná Bridge	Santa Fe-Paraná	Planned		
Rosario-Victoria Bridge	Rosario-Victoria	2003	National Route 174	32°52′11.4″S 60°41′07.9″W
Bartolomé Mitre Bridge	Zárate-Ceibas	1977	National Route 12	34°06′10.9″S 59°00′10″W
Justo José de Urquiza Bridge	Zárate-Ceibas	1977	National Route 12	33°54′37.1″S 58°53′06.9″W

== See also ==
- Paraná Basin
- Tributaries of the Río de la Plata
