= Companhia Energética de São Paulo =

Brazilian electricity producer

- Company type: Sociedade Anônima
- Traded as: B3: CESP3, CESP5, CESP6
- Industry: Electricity
- Founded: 1966
- Headquarters: São Paulo, Brazil
- Key people: Dilma Seli Pena, (CEO)
- Products: Electric power
- Revenue: ▼US$ 422.4 million (2017)
- Net income: ▼ -US$58.5 million (2017)
- Number of employees: 1,470
- Website: www.cesp.com.br

The Companhia Energética de São Paulo (CESP) is the largest producer of electricity in the state of São Paulo, with total installed power of 7,455 MW, and the third largest in Brazil. It owns and operates six hydroelectric plants integrated into the National Interconnected System.

== See also ==
- Eng Sérgio Motta Dam
- Ilha Solteira Dam
