= List of rivers of Argentina =

This is a list of rivers of Argentina.

== Longest Rivers ==
Name	Length (km)	Length (mi)	Discharge (m^{3}/s)	Discharge (cu ft/s)
Paraná River	4,880	3,030	16,806	593,500
Uruguay River	1,110	690	5,026	177,500
Negro River	635	395	865	30,500
Bermejo River	1,000	620	339	12,000
Pilcomayo River	850	530	152	5,400
Colorado River	860	530	134	4,700
Salado River	700	430	88	3,100
San Juan River	500	310	56	2,000
Mendoza River	400	250	50	1,800
Chubut River	810	500	48	1,700
Salado del Norte River	2,000	1,200	15	530
Desaguadero River	1,200	750	14	490
Deseado River	615	382	5	180

== By drainage basin ==
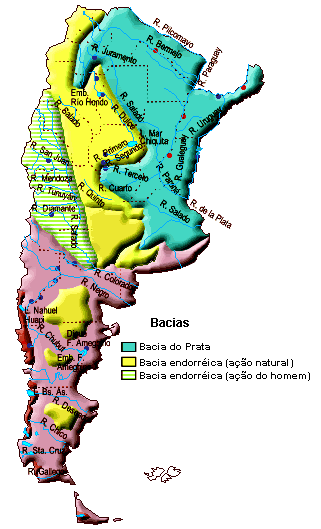
A map of Argentina's river drainage basins.

This list is arranged by drainage basin, with respective tributaries indented under each larger stream's name. Rivers in the table above are in bold.

=== La Plata Basin ===
- Río de la Plata
  - **Uruguay River**
    - Gualeguaychú River
    - Mocoretá River
    - Miriñay River
    - Aguapey River
    - Pepiri-Guazu River
  - **Paraná River**
    - Arrecifes River
    - Gualeguay River
    - Nogoyá River
    - Arroyo del Medio
    - Saladillo Stream
    - Ludueña Stream
    - Carcarañá River
      - Tercero River (Calamuchita River)
      - Cuarto River (Saladillo River, Chocancharava River)
    - **Salado River** (Salado del Norte, Juramento River, Pasaje River, Calchaquí River)
      - Horcones River
        - Urueña River
      - Arenales River
      - Rosario River
      - Guasamayo River
    - San Javier River
    - Feliciano River
    - Guayquiraró River
    - Corriente River
    - Paraná Miní River
      - Tapenagá River
      - Palometa River
    - Santa Lucía River
    - Negro River
    - Guaycurú River
    - **Paraguay River**
      - Río de Oro
      - **Bermejo River** (Teuco River)
        - Bermejito River
          - Dorado River
        - Teuquito River
        - Seco River
        - San Francisco River
          - Grande River
          - Mojotoro River (Lavayén River)
        - Pescado River
          - Iruya River
        - Río Grande de Tarija
          - Itaú River
        - Lipeo River
      - **Pilcomayo River**
        - Pilaya River (Bolivia)
          - San Juan del Oro River (Bolivia)
            - Río Grande de San Juan
    - Urugua-í River
    - Iguazu River
      - San Antonio River
  - Luján River
    - Reconquista River
  - Matanza River (Riachuelo)
- Samborombón Bay
  - Samborombón River
  - **Salado River**

=== Atlantic Ocean - Patagonia ===
- Quequén Grande River
- Sauce Grande River
- Naposta Stream
- Sauce Chico River
- **Colorado River**
  - **Desaguadero River** (Salado River, Bermejo River, Vinchina River) (usually does not reach the Colorado)
    - Atuel River
    - Diamante River
    - Tunuyán River
    - **San Juan River**
      - **Mendoza River**
        - Tupungato River
      - Castaño Viejo River
      - Calingasta River
      - Río de los Patos
        - Blanco River
    - Jáchal River
      - Blanco River
    - Huaco River
  - Barrancas River
  - Grande River
- **Río Negro**
  - Neuquén River
    - Agrio River
  - Limay River
    - Collón Curá River
      - Aluminé River
      - Chimehuin River
    - Traful River
- **Chubut River**
  - Chico River
    - Senguerr River
      - Mayo River
        - Guenguel River
  - Tecka River
  - Chico River
- **Deseado River**
  - Pinturas River
  - Fénix Grande River
- Santa Cruz River
  - Chico River
    - Chalía River (Shehuen River)
    - Belgrano River
  - La Leona River
- Coig River (Coyle River)
  - Pelque River
- Gallegos River
  - Chico River
- Grande River
- Fuego River

=== Pacific Ocean (Argentina - Chile) ===
- Futaleufú River
  - Percey River
  - Corintos River
- Hua-Hum River
- Mayer River
- Palena River
- Pico River
- Puelo River
- Simpson River
- Vizcachas River

=== Interior basins ===
- Carapari River
  - Itiyuro River
- Tartagal River
- Salado River (Colorado River)
  - Belén River
  - Abaucán River
- Mar Chiquita (Córdoba)
  - Dulce River
    - Saladillo River
    - Salí River
  - Primero River (Suquía River)
    - Cosquín River
  - Segundo River (Xanaes River)
- Cruz del Eje River
- Conlara River
- Quinto River (Popopis River)
- Malargüe River

== Alphabetically ==
- Abaucán River
- Agrio River
- Aguapey River
- Aluminé River
- Arenales River
- Arrecifes River
- Atuel River
- Azul River
- Barrancas River
- Belén River
- Belgrano River
- Bermejo River (Teuco River)
- Bermejito River
- Blanco River
- Blanco River (Río de los Patos)
- Calingasta River
- Carapari River
- Carcarañá River
- Castaño Viejo River
- Chalía River (Shehuen River)
- Chico River (Lower Chubut)
- Chico River (Upper Chubut)
- Chico River (Santa Cruz)
- Chico River (Gallegos)
- Chimehuin River
- Chubut River
- Coig River (Coyle River)
- Collón Curá River
- Colorado River
- Conlara River
- Corriente River
- Cosquín River
- Cruz del Eje River
- Cuarto River (Saladillo River, Chocancharava River)
- Desaguadero River (Salado River, Bermejo River, Vinchina River)
- Deseado River
- Diamante River
- Dorado River
- Dulce River
- Feliciano River
- Fénix Grande River
- Fuego River
- Futaleufú River
- Gallegos River
- Grande River
- Grande River (Jujuy)
- Grande River (Tierra del Fuego)
- Río Grande de San Juan
- Río Grande de Tarija
- Gualeguay River
- Gualeguaychú River
- Guasamayo River
- Guaycurú River
- Guayquiraró River
- Guenguel River
- Horcones River
- Huaco River
- Hua Hum River
- Iguazu River
- Iruya River
- Itaú River
- Itiyuro River
- Jáchal River
- La Leona River
- Limay River
- Lipeo River
- Ludueña Stream
- Luján River
- Malargüe River
- Manso River
- Matanza River (Riachuelo)
- Mayer River
- Mayo River
- Mendoza River
- Middle Stream
- Miriñay River
- Mocoretá River
- Mojotoro River (Lavayén River)
- Naposta Stream
- Río Negro
- Negro River
- Neuquén River
- Nogoyá River
- Palena River (Carrenleufú River, Corcovado River)
- Palometa River
- Paraguay River
- Paraná River
- Paraná River
- Pelque River
- Pepiri-Guazu River
- Pescado River
- Pico River
- Pilcomayo River
- Pinturas River
- Primero River (Suquía River)
- Puelo River
- Quequén Grande River
- Quinto River (Popopis River)
- Reconquista River
- Río de la Plata
- Río de los Patos
- Río de Oro
- Rosario River
- Saladillo River
- Saladillo Stream
- Salado River (Salado del Norte, Juramento River, Pasaje River, Calchaquí River)
- Salado River (Buenos Aires)
- Salado River (Colorado River)
- Salí River
- Samborombón River
- San Antonio River
- San Francisco River
- San Javier River
- San Juan River
- Santa Cruz River
- Santa Lucía River
- Sauce Chico River
- Sauce Grande River
- Seco River
- Segundo River (Xanaes River)
- Senguerr River
- Tapenagá River
- Tartagal River
- Tecka River
- Tercero River (Calamuchita River)
- Teuquito River
- Traful River
- Tunuyán River
- Tupungato River
- Turbio River
- Urueña River
- Urugua-í River
- Uruguay River
- Vizcachas River

== See also ==
- Water resources management in Argentina
- List of rivers of the Americas by coastline
