= List of rivers of Mendoza Province =

This is a list of rivers that are part of the Mendoza Province of Argentina. All rivers born on the area of the Andes range, except the Desaguadero River mainly located in the provinces of San Juan, San Luis and Mendoza in the Argentine region called Cuyo.

== Rivers by alphabetical order ==
- Atuel River
- Barrancas River
- Blanco River
- Chico River
- Cobre River
- Colorado River
- De las Vacas River
- Desaguadero River (also known as Salado River in the southern zone)
- Diamante River
- Grande River
- Horcones River
- Las Cuevas River
- Las Tunas River
- Malargüe River
- Mendoza River
- Montañez River
- Pabellón River
- Picheuta River
- Potimalal River
- Relinchos River
- San Carlos River
- Tordillo River
- Tunuyán River
- Tupungato River
- Uspallata River
- Valenzuela River

== See also ==
- List of rivers of Argentina:)
