= Blanca Bay =

Bay in northern Argentina

- Bahía Blanca (Spanish)
- Location within Argentina
- Location: South America
- Coordinates: 39°03′44″S 62°04′00″W
- River sources: Sauce Chico River, Napostá Stream
- Ocean/sea sources: Argentine Sea, South Atlantic Ocean
- Basin countries: Argentina
- Settlements: Punta Alta, Bahía Blanca, General Daniel Cerri, Ingeniero White

Blanca Bay (Spanish: Bahía Blanca) is a bay of the Argentine Sea located in the transition between Pampas and Patagonia. This bay is a deep and narrow sea inlet on the continent. It is located in the southwest of the province of Buenos Aires, in the center-east of Argentina. Its name gave its own name to the most important city near its banks, the city of Bahía Blanca.

== Toponymy ==
Bahía Blanca means "White Bay". The name is due to the typical colour of the salt covering the soil surrounding the shores. The bay (which is actually an estuary) was seen by Ferdinand Magellan during his first circumnavigation of the world on the orders of Charles I of Spain, in 1520, looking for a canal connecting the Atlantic to the Pacific Ocean along the coasts of South America.
