= Hisonotus maculipinnis =

Conservation status
- Least Concern (IUCN 3.1)

Scientific classification
- Kingdom: Animalia
- Phylum: Chordata
- Class: Actinopterygii
- Order: Siluriformes
- Family: Loricariidae
- Genus: Hisonotus
- Species: H. maculipinnis

Binomial name
- Hisonotus maculipinnis (Regan, 1912)

Synonyms
- Otocinclus maculipinnis Regan, 1912; Microlepidogaster maculipinnis (Regan, 1912)

Species of catfish

Hisonotus maculipinnis is a species of freshwater ray-finned fish belonging to the family Loricariidae, the suckermouth armored catfishes, and the subfamily Hypoptopomatinae. the cascudinhos. This catfish is found in Argentina and Uruguay where it occurs in the Paraná, Rio de la Plata, Ibera, Uruguay, Iguazu, Corriente, Colastine and Nogoya rivers as well as the Iberá Wetlands. This species reaches a standard length of 4.0 cm (1.6 in).
