= Itaú River =

Coordinates: 22°20′S 64°06′W

Location
- Countries: Argentina and Bolivia

Physical characteristics
- Mouth
  - location: Río Grande de Tarija

The Itaú River (Spanish, Río Itaú) is a river of Argentina and Bolivia. It is a tributary of the Río Grande de Tarija.

== See also ==
- List of rivers of Argentina
- List of rivers of Bolivia
