= Iruya River =

Coordinates: 22°20′12″S 64°5′52″W

Location
- Country: Argentina

Physical characteristics
- Mouth
  - location: Pescado River

The Iruya River (Spanish, Río Iruya,) is a river of Argentina. It is a tributary of the Pescado River.

== See also ==
- List of rivers of Argentina
- List of tributaries of the Río de la Plata
