= March 2007 floods in Argentina's Litoral region =

Natural disaster in Argentina

The Litoral region of Argentina underwent heavy rainstorms in the early autumn season of 2007. Starting in late March and ending in mid-April, the rains caused several major rivers to rise and/or overflow their banks, partly or completely flooded many towns and large cities, ruined a significant part of the crops in a wide region, and severely damaged the physical infrastructure. At least 15 people were killed as a result of the flooding.

== Affected area ==
The area hit by the main storm was the central and southern Argentine Litoral region, comprising the south-center of Santa Fe Province (west of the Paraná River) and the south of Entre Ríos Province (east of the Paraná River). The latter is part of the southern Mesopotamia (lit. "between rivers", thus called because it lies within the drainage basin of the Paraná and the Uruguay River). Increased rainfall also hit locations in the northeast of Buenos Aires Province, along the course of the Paraná, before it empties into the Río de la Plata (beside which Buenos Aires is located). Associated storms hit the southeast of Córdoba Province, immediately west of Santa Fe.

The largest metropolitan areas in the affected area were Santa Fe (pop. 460,000) and Rosario (pop. 1.2 million). Tens of other cities and towns were also affected, including Rafaela (pop. 84,000) in central Santa Fe and Gualeguay (pop. 39,000) in southern Entre Ríos.

The southern Argentine littoral is the heart of the Humid Pampa and the most productive farming region in the country, producing a large portion of the beef, cereals and dairy commodities consumed or exported. Only in Santa Fe Province, the storms ruined 30,000 km² of crops and rendered important regions of pasture land unusable.

=== Watercourses ===
The main river in the affected area is the Paraná River, which is the second longest in South America after the Amazon. It forms the natural limit between the provinces of Santa Fe and Entre Ríos, and empties into the Río de la Plata. The Paraná–Plata system thus passes by Argentina's most densely populated area.

Other affected watercourses were:

- In Santa Fe, the right-hand-side (western) tributaries of the Paraná: near Santa Fe City, the Salado River; farther south, the Carcarañá River; and in Rosario, the Ludueña Stream and the Saladillo Stream.
- In Entre Ríos: the Gualeguay River, which divides the province in two.

== Development ==
On 26 March 2007 a rainstorm started in the area around Rosario. With few interruptions, the rain continued for about a week. Rosario is traversed by the Ludueña Stream in the north; its southern border is partly defined by the Saladillo Stream. The Ludueña has historically been prone to overflowing, which has prompted the construction of works (canals and piping) to contain and derive its waters. Soon after the beginning of the rain, the Ibarlucea Canal (which empties into the main course of the Ludueña, overflowed and flooded several neighbourhoods in the northwest of Rosario. At the peak of the crisis, on 31 March, about 4,000 people were evacuated in several emergency centers throughout the city.

As the strong rain started to subside in Rosario, the storms were moving north towards the area of Santa Fe, the provincial capital. Santa Fe is built on low-lying terrain at the junction of the Salado and Paraná rivers, and is still recovering from a flood caused by the Salado in 2003. This time, however, both rivers were rising. At some point, the physical barriers that had been set in place against the rise of the Paraná River prevented the natural drainage of the flood waters brought by the Salado. The existing pumps were not enough, and there was a delay bringing extra ones. As the neighbouring areas were flooded and the incoming roads submerged or damaged, Santa Fe became practically isolated with the exception of the Hernandarias Subfluvial Tunnel. About 20,000 people were displaced or evacuated.

The provincial government decreed a state of hydrical emergency on 29 March. Evacuees were sent to military and private facilities (such as sports clubs and schools), where they were given food and shelter, and the risk population (mainly children) was vaccinated. After the end of the emergency, as the first estimates of the damages were released, the provincial government set aside funds (620 million Argentine pesos, about 200 million USD) to assist the affected towns and cities; of these, AR$30 million were assigned to each of Santa Fe City and Rosario.
