= Aguapeí River =

Aguapeí River or Aguapey River may refer to:

- Aguapeí River (Mato Grosso), Brazil
- Aguapeí River (São Paulo), Brazil
- Aguapey River, Argentina
