= Hernando de Lerma =

16th-century Spanish conquistador; founder of present-day Salta, Argentina

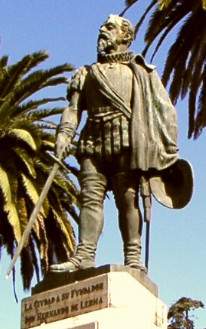
Hernando de Lerma

Hernando de Lerma Polanco (born November 1, 1541) was a conqueror, politician, lawyer and city founder from Salta, Argentina.

On November 13, 1577, Lerma was named Governor of Tucumán, (in present Argentina) by Spanish King Philip II. Described by historians as a man of violence, de Lerma had problems with several people from the area, including fellow countrymen. Among those he persecuted were the spokesman of a Catholic bishop. He also disliked Francisco Salcedo, another Catholic man who built a church in Santiago del Estero.

Many of de Lerma's opponents ended up in jail or being killed. Salcedo retired to another city and became convalescent, but he was returned to Tucumán by de Lerma's men after he found him. In Tucumán, Salcedo was tried and jailed. A large number of Salcedo's supporters were killed.

In April 1582, de Lerma founded the city of Salta, next to the Arenales River. He foresaw Salta as an economic center, since the Spanish government had opened seaports in Santiago de Chile, Callao and Buenos Aires. Salta's situation between the Viceroyalty of Peru and the port at the Río de la Plata river, according to de Lerma, would be an advantage for the city, as it connected the city directly with the aforementioned places, and de Lerma believed that Madrid's government would re-route their shipments through Salta. He had the city named "Lerma City on Salta Valley". Hernando de Lerma befriended Indians who populated the area, believing their hands could be of help to him. He also attracted other Spaniards to the area.

After he established the city, however, de Lerma had to face many new rivals and problems. More conquerors arrived in Salta and tried to seize the city, causing multiple feuds. The city went through many periods of disease, and it had been erected in an area with frequent tremors.

In 1584, de Lerma was arrested and sentenced to jail in Salta. He appealed, and returned to Spain to take his case to the supreme court, but his appeal was rejected and he was sent to a Spanish jail. While it is known he died in jail, the year in which he died is not known.

Historian Paul Goussac said that "de Lerma's administration was nothing but a series of criminal attempts." Salta-born historian Armando Bazan describes de Lerma "as malign as a disease" in one of his books.
