= Feliciano River =

River in Argentina

Coordinates: 31°5′25″S 59°53′46″W

The Feliciano River (Spanish, Arroyo Feliciano) is a river in the Argentine province of Entre Ríos, in the Mesopotamia. It is born on the Lomada del Mocoretá, on the northeast of the province, east of San José de Feliciano, and flows west-southwest across the province. Its course receives the waters of several streams, and after 198 kilometres (123 mi) it empties into the Paraná River near Piedras Blancas.

== See also ==
- List of rivers of Argentina
