= Río Blanco (Río de los Patos) =

Location
- Country: Argentina

Physical characteristics
- Mouth
  - location: Río de los Patos

The Río Blanco (Spanish for "white river") is a river in Argentina near Calingasta in the southwestern part of the province of San Juan. It is a tributary of the Río de los Patos, which is one of the three sources of the San Juan River, which empties into the Desaguadero River basin.

== See also ==
- List of rivers of Argentina
