= Huaco =

Huaco may refer to:

- Guaco, a type of plant found in Central America, South America, and India
- Huaco, San Juan, Argentina
- Huaco River, a river in Argentina
- Huaco (pottery), a type of pottery in Peru
