= 2007 floods =

2007 floods may refer to:

- 2006-2007 Malaysian floods
- 2007 United Kingdom floods
- 2007 South Asian floods
- 2007 Sudan floods
- June 2007 Hunter Region and Central Coast storms
- 2007 Midwest flooding in the United States
- 2007 Mozambican flood
- 2007 North Korea flooding
- 2007 Jakarta flood
- March 2007 floods in the Argentine littoral
- June 2007 Texas flooding
- 2007 Tabasco flood

== See also ==
- List of notable floods
- Floods in the United States: 2001-present
