= Mojotoro River =

Watercourse in Argentina

Coordinates: 24°11′49″S 64°41′39″W

The Mojotoro River, or Lavayen River (Spanish, Río Lavayén) is a river in the province of Salta, Argentina. It is a tributary of the San Francisco River. It is the natural north border of the municipality of Salta, the provincial capital. Its catchment basin drains an area of 835 square kilometres (322 sq mi) and is in turn a part of the upper basin of the Bermejo River.

The Mojotoro is born at the confluence of the Vaqueros River with the Wierna River, which flows along the Siancas Valley in La Caldera Department. When the river Mojotoro enters Jujuy Province, its name changes to Lavayén.

== See also ==
- List of rivers of Argentina
