= Urueña River =

Coordinates: 26°14′S 64°30′W

Location
- Country: Argentina

Physical characteristics
- Mouth
  - location: Horcones River

The Urueña River (Spanish, Río Río Urueña) is a river of Argentina. It is a tributary of the Horcones River.

== See also ==
- List of rivers of Argentina
