= Teuquito River =

Location
- Country: Argentina

The Teuquito River is a river of Argentina.

== See also ==
- List of rivers of Argentina
