= Cruz del Eje River =

River in Argentina

Coordinates: 30.4913°S 65.1027°W

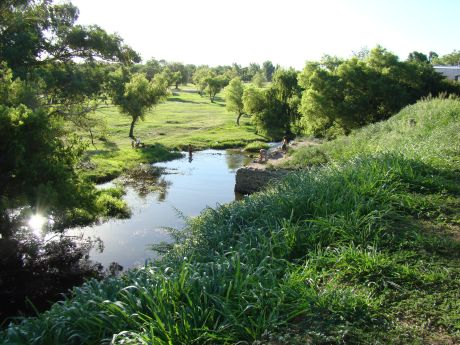

- Location of mouth

Location
- Country: Argentina

The Cruz del Eje River is a river in Argentina.

== See also ==
- List of rivers of Argentina
