= Gualeguay River =

River in Argentina

Coordinates: 33°18′26″S 59°38′24″W

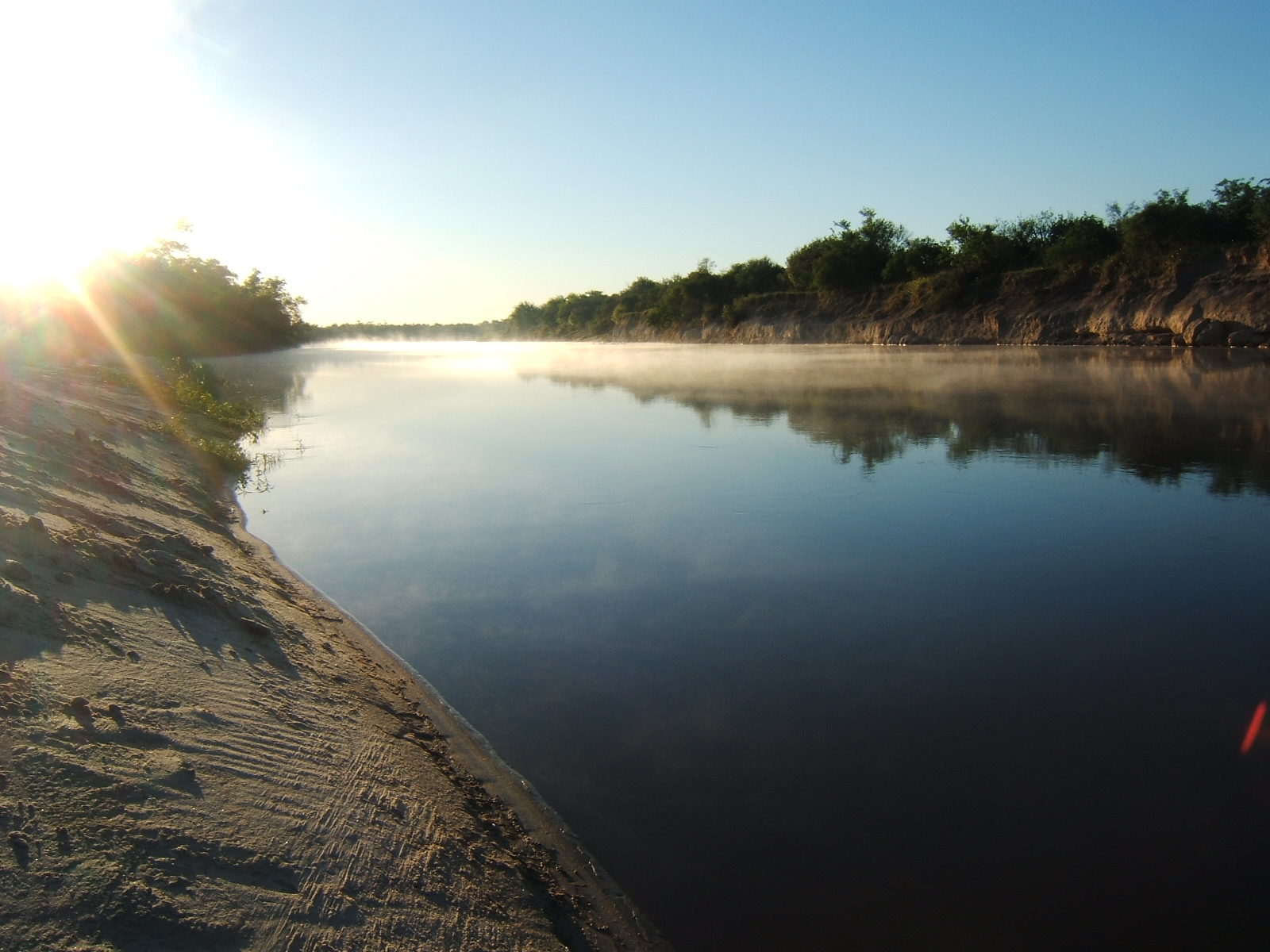
Gualeguay River near "Larroque"

The Gualeguay River (Spanish Río Gualeguay) is one of the major rivers of the Mesopotamic province of Entre Ríos, Argentina. Its source is in the north of the province, in the region between the cities of Federación and San José de Feliciano, and meanders in a general south-southwestward direction across the center of the province for about 350 to 375 kilometres (217 to 233 mi), receiving a large number of tributary streams. It passes by the cities of Villaguay, Rosario del Tala, and Gualeguay, and finally empties into the Río Paraná Ibicuy, a distributary of the Paraná River in the Paraná Delta.

The Gualeguay's drainage basin covers an area of 22,716 square kilometres (8,771 sq mi) (about one third of the total area of the province), along a depressed area between the systems of low hills of the west (Cuchilla de Montiel) and east (Cuchilla Grande) of Entre Ríos. Measurements taken in 1964–1968 place its average discharge at 210 cubic metres per second (7,400 cu ft/s).

== See also ==
- List of rivers of Argentina
