= Miriñay River =

River in Corrientes, Argentina

Coordinates: 30°10′12″S 57°37′59″W

The Miriñay River (Spanish Miriñay Río) is a small river in the province of Corrientes, Argentina. It is born on the eponymous wetlands (Esteros del Miriñay) southeast of the Iberá Wetlands, and flows south for about 200 kilometres (120 mi) until emptying into the Uruguay River near Monte Caseros. Its course runs along a wide alluvial plain.

== See also ==
- List of rivers of Argentina
