= Río Negro (Chaco Province) =

River in Argentina

Rio Negro (Chaco Province)
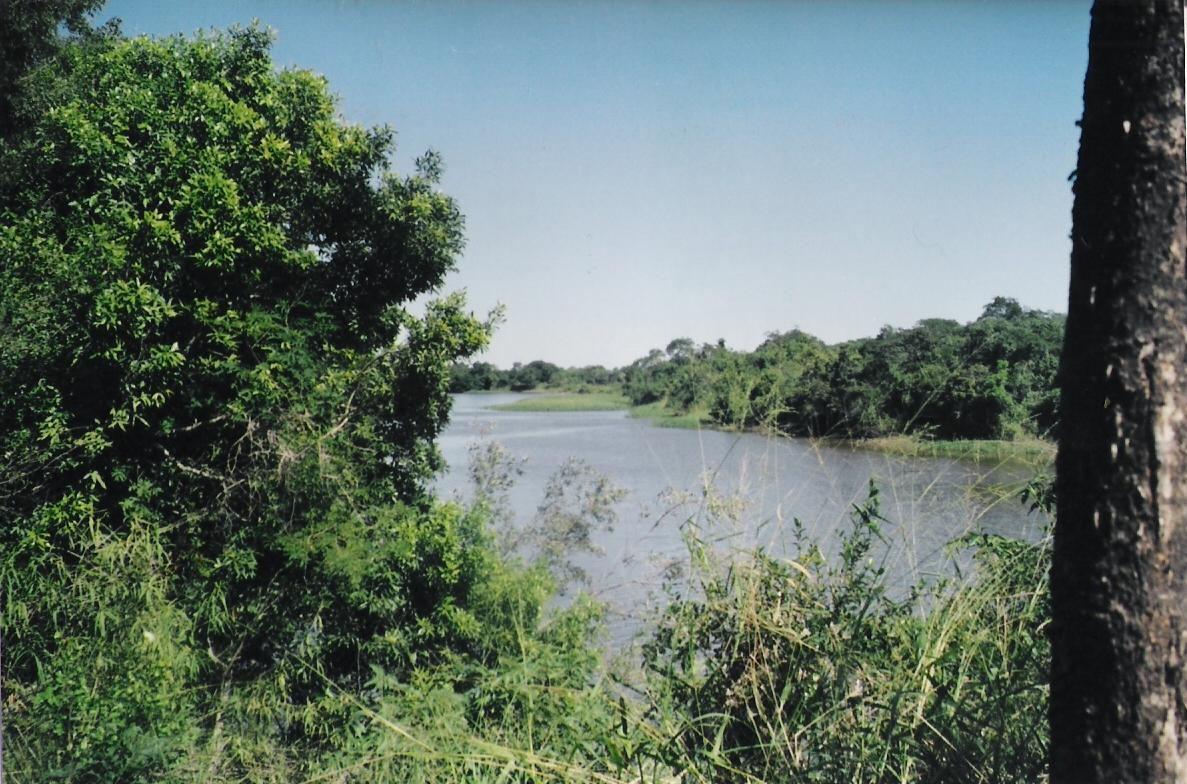
- View of the Río Negro near Resistencia, Chaco

- Location of mouth

Location
- Country: Argentina
- Province: Chaco Province

Physical characteristics
- Mouth
  - coordinates: 27°28′8″S 58°53′48″W

Río Negro (Spanish for "black river") is a river in the Chaco Province in Argentina. It crosses the Chaco National Park and flows southeast. Near its mouth it flows by the cities of Puerto Tirol, Resistencia, and Barranqueras, where it finally reaches Barranqueras River, an arm of the Paraná River.

The river has changed its course over the flatlands several times over the years, leaving wetlands, meanders and lagoons. This took place because of three different factors; frequent droughts, accumulation of sediment, and human-made deviations of the riverbed. Sections of the river are currently contaminated by industrial waste, mainly from the leather tanning industry.

The Río Negro is of historical importance to Resistencia, capital of Chaco Province, since most immigrants that populated Chaco reached the city in boats travelling up-river. On February 2 every year, the Festival of the Canoes and Boats is celebrated, commemorating the day of the arrival of the first steamboat that brought Friulian pioneers to the province.

== See also ==
- List of rivers of Argentina
