= Arrecifes River =

Coordinates: 33°45′19″S 59°34′11″W

Location
- Country: Argentina

Physical characteristics
- Mouth
  - location: Paraná River (Río Paraná de las Palmas)

The Arrecifes River (Spanish Río Arrecifes) is a river of Argentina. It is a tributary of the Paraná River. It flows into the Paraná Delta area and joins the Paraná de las Palmas distributary of the Paraná River.

== See also ==
- List of rivers of Argentina
