= Santa Lucía River (Argentina) =

Coordinates: 29°4′43″S 59°14′9″W

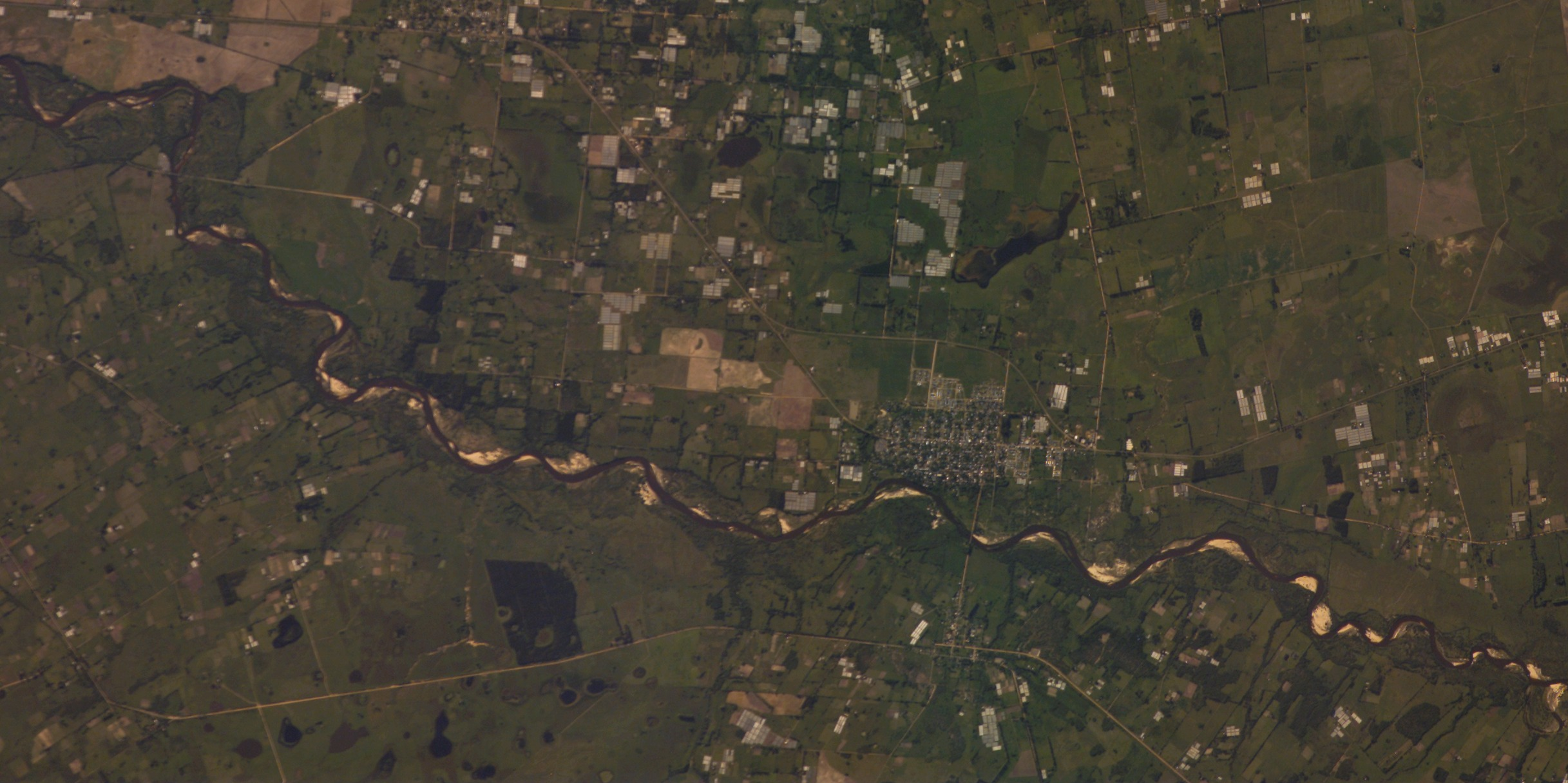

- Location of mouth

Location
- Country: Argentina

Physical characteristics
- Source: Iberá Wetlands
  - elevation: 206 feet (63 m)
- Mouth: Paraná River
  - location: Goya
  - elevation: 125 feet (38 m)
- Length: 180 kilometres (110 mi)

The Santa Lucía River (Spanish, Río Santa Lucía) is a river in Corrientes Province, Argentina. It is a tributary of the Paraná River.

The Santa Lucía arises in the Iberá Wetlands and flows southwest past the towns of San Roque and Santa Lucía, then on to Goya, where it joins the Paraná.

== See also ==
- List of rivers of Argentina
