= Chalía River =

Coordinates: 49.5936°S 69.5135°W

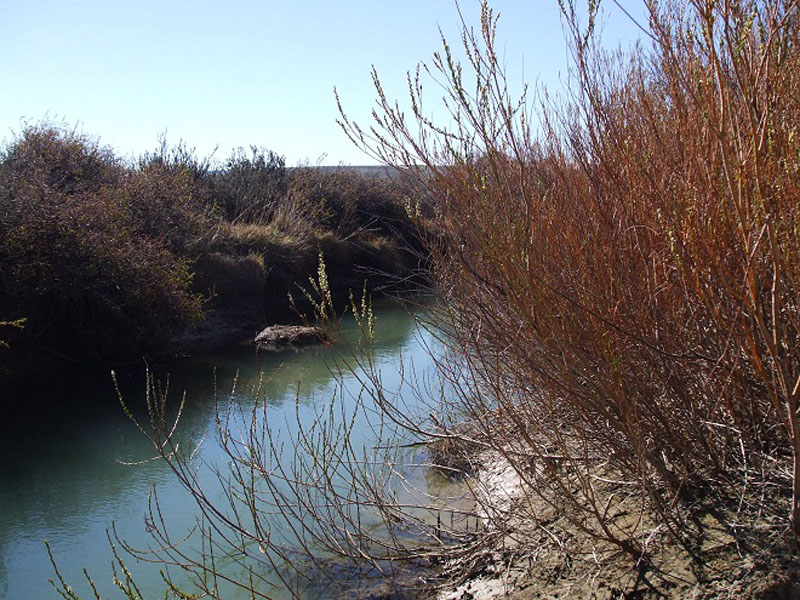

Location
- Country: Argentina

The Chalía River is a river of Argentina.

== See also ==
- List of rivers of Argentina
