= Carapari River =

River in Argentina

- Location of mouth

Location
- Country: Argentina

A historical photograph showing the firing of ceramic pottery near the Carapari River, based on the original documentation from the National Museums of World Culture.

The Carapari River is a river of Argentina and Bolivia.

== See also ==
- List of rivers of Argentina
- List of rivers of Bolivia
