= Guenguel River =

Coordinates: 45.6842°S 70.3198°W

Location
- Country: Argentina

The Guenguel River is a river of Argentina in Chubut province. It is a tributary to the Senguerr river.

== See also ==
- List of rivers of Argentina
