= Pelque River =

Coordinates: 51°02′02″S 70°58′05″W

Location
- Country: Argentina

The Pelque River is a river of Argentina.

== See also ==
- List of rivers of Argentina
