= Chico River (Santa Cruz) =

Coordinates: 49°54′13″S 68°33′50″W

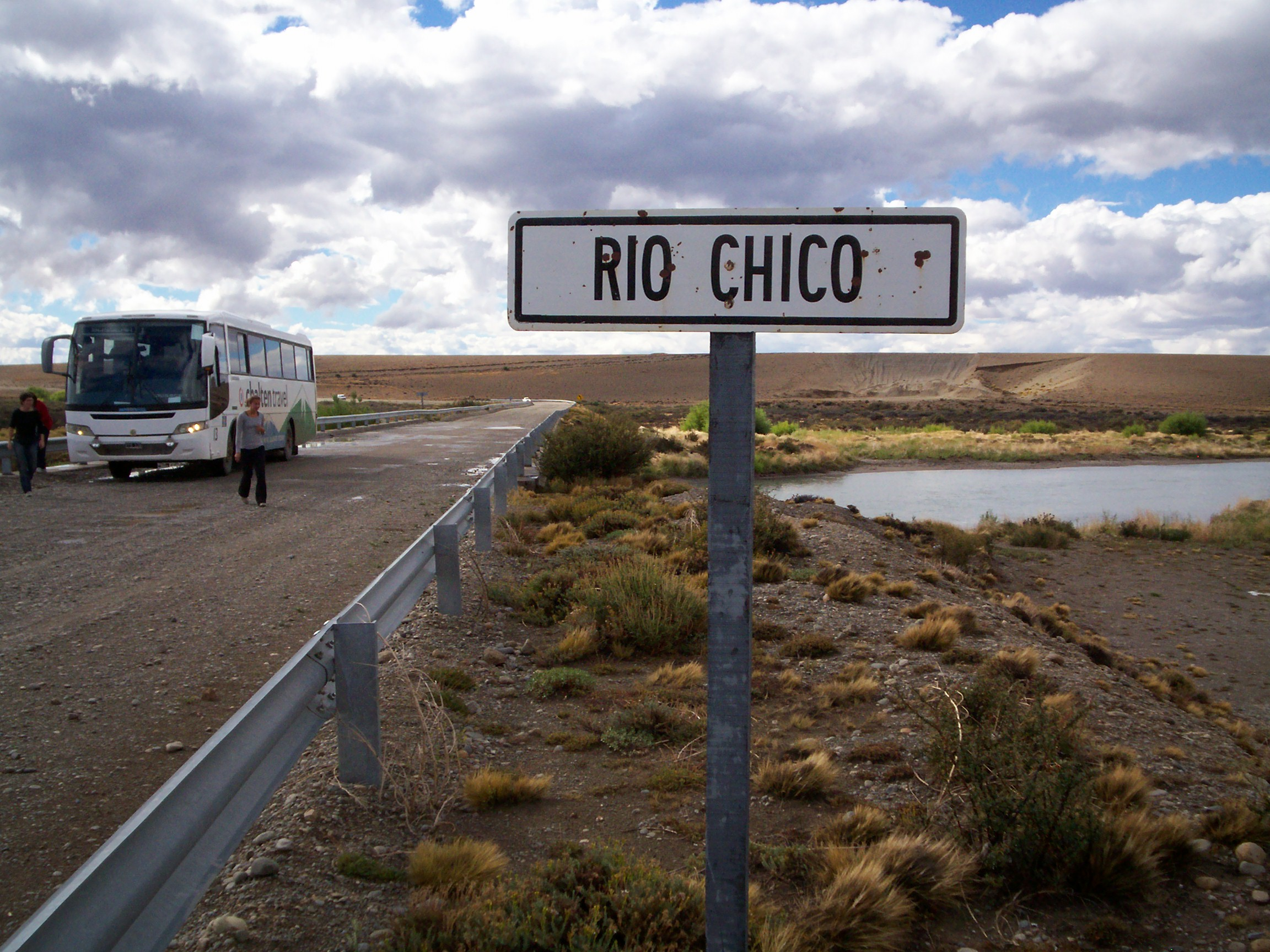

Location
- Country: Argentina

The Chico River is a river of Argentina.

== See also ==
- List of rivers of Argentina
