= Río de Oro (Argentina) =

Coordinates: 27°4′S 58°34′W

Location
- Country: Argentina

Physical characteristics
- Mouth
  - location: Paraguay River

The Río de Oro is a river of Chaco Province, Argentina. It is a tributary of the Paraguay River, which is debouches into near Humaitá, Paraguay.

== See also ==
- List of rivers of Argentina
