= Guasamayo River =

Location
- Country: Argentina

The Guasamayo River is a river of Argentina.

== See also ==
- List of rivers of Argentina
