= Fuego River =

River in Argentina

Río Fuego
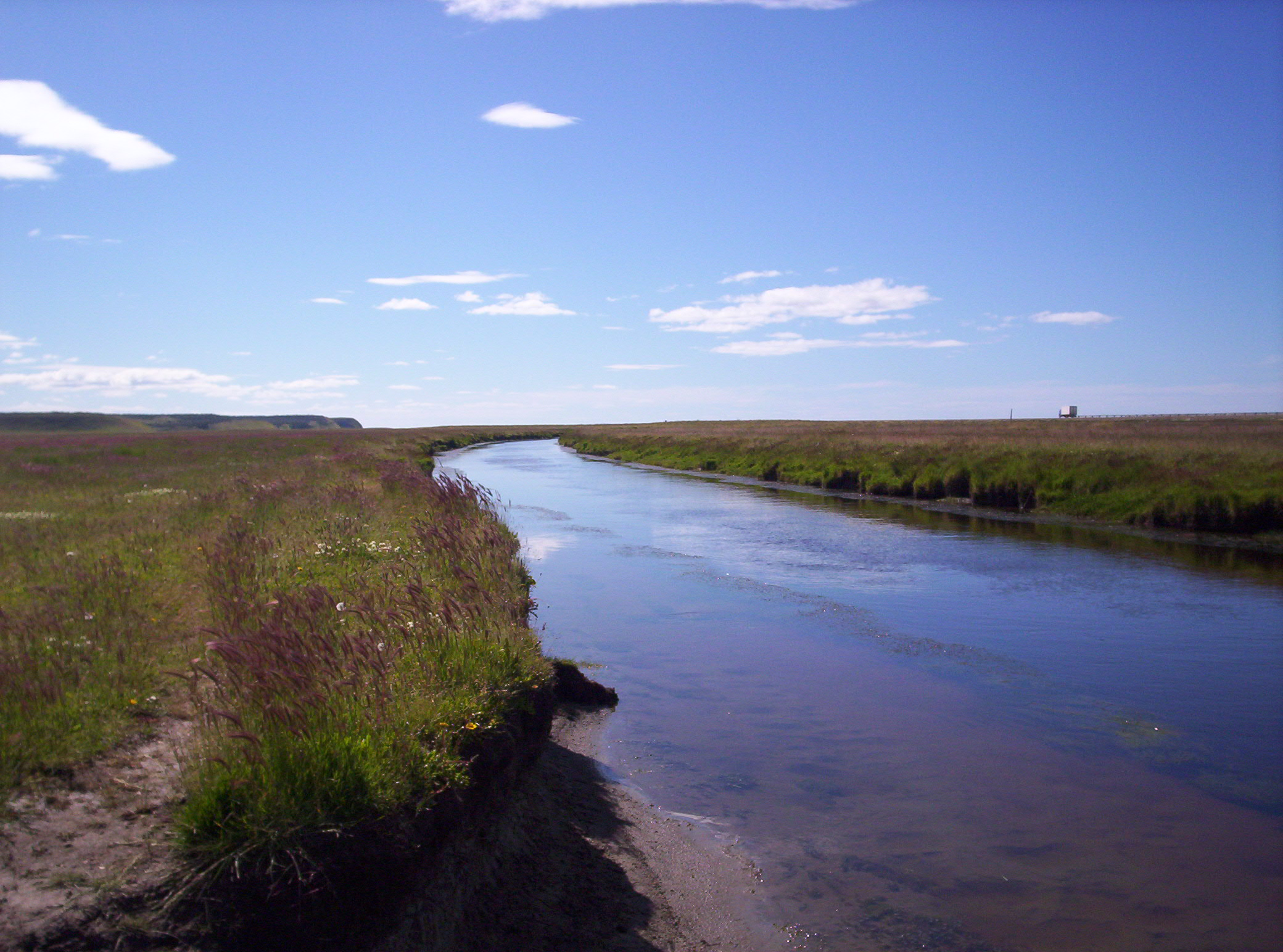

- Location of mouth

Location
- Country: Argentina
- Province: Tierra del Fuego

Physical characteristics
- Mouth
  - location: Lago Fuego
  - coordinates: 54°00′17.9″S 67°37′12.8″W

The Fuego River is a river of Argentina. It is located on the island of Tierra del Fuego.

== See also ==
- List of rivers of Argentina
