= Chico River (Upper Chubut) =

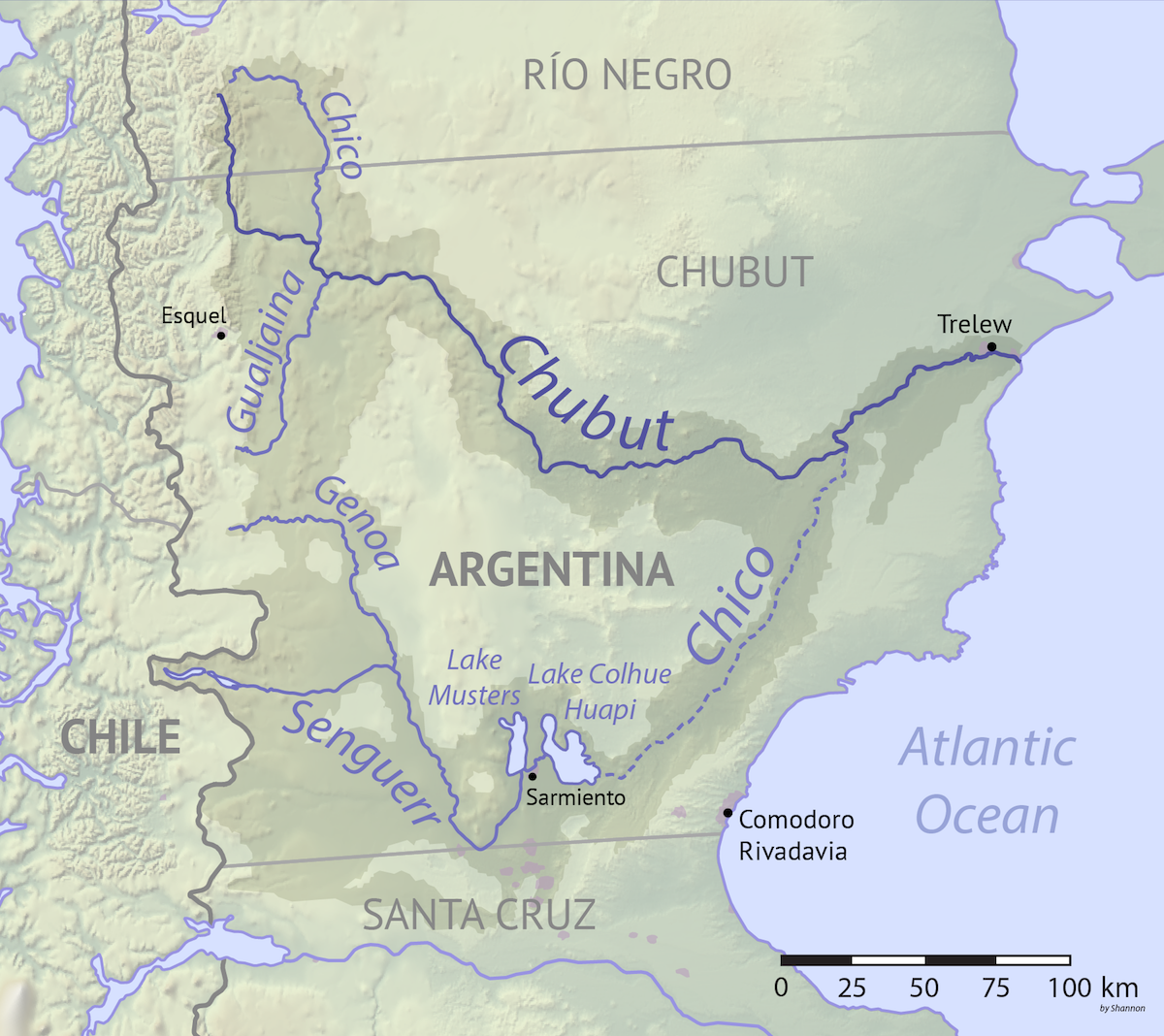
- Map of the Chubut River drainage basin, showing the Chico River joining the Chubut at upper left.

Location
- Country: Argentina

The Chico River is a river, about 120 km (75 mi) long, flowing from Río Negro into Chubut Province, Argentina. Originating in the Andes foothills, it joins the Chubut River to the south of Cushamen.

This river is not to be confused with the much longer Chico River joining the Chubut at Florentino Ameghino Dam.

== See also ==
- List of rivers of Argentina
