= Castaño Viejo River =

Coordinates: 30°59′0″S 69°34′0″W

Location
- Country: Argentina

The Castaño Viejo River is a river of Argentina.

== See also ==
- List of rivers of Argentina
