= Rosario River (Argentina) =

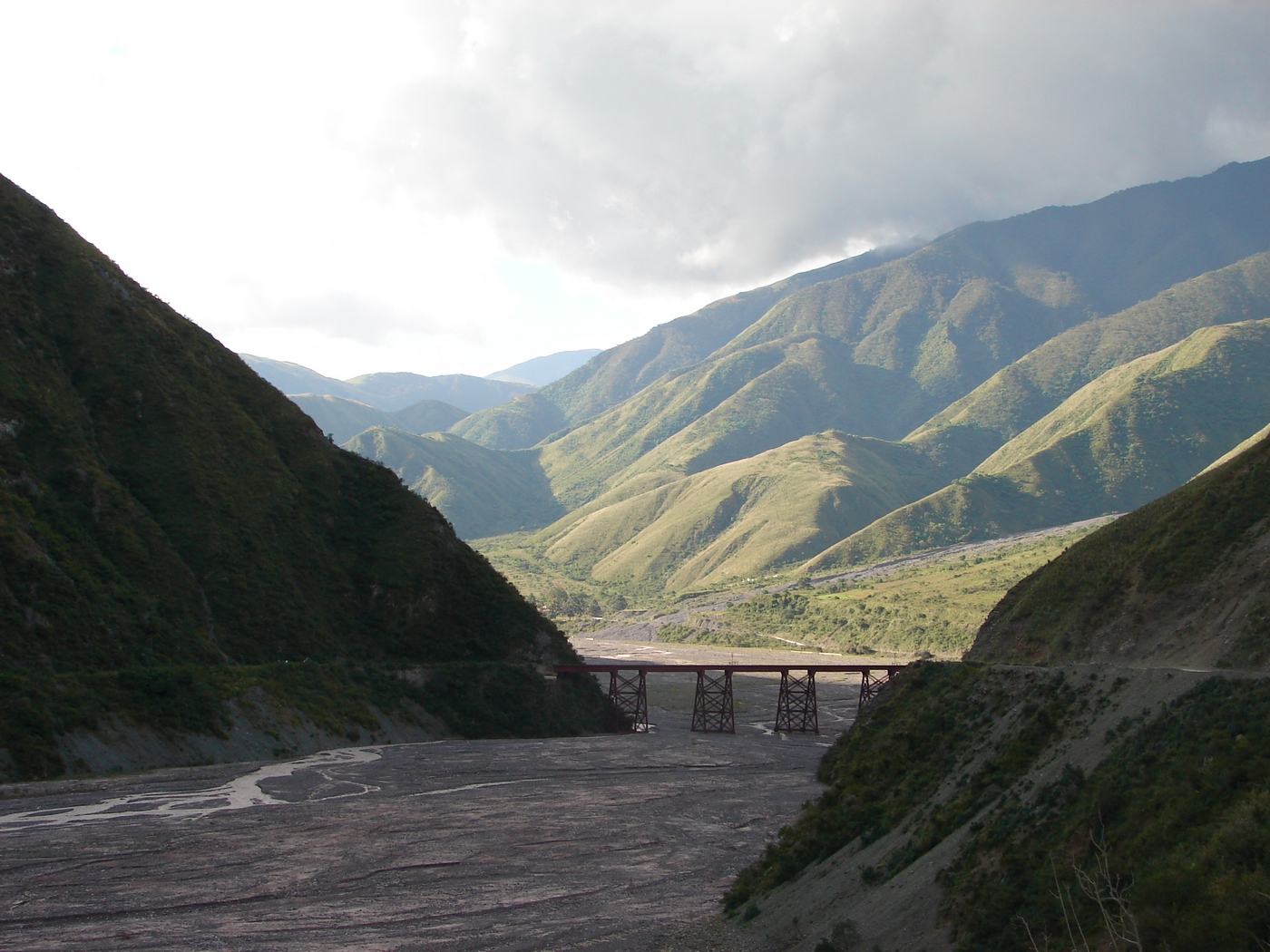

Location
- Country: Argentina

The Rosario River is a river in Argentina.

== See also ==
- List of rivers of Argentina
