= Rio Grande (Jujuy) =

River in Argentina

Grande River
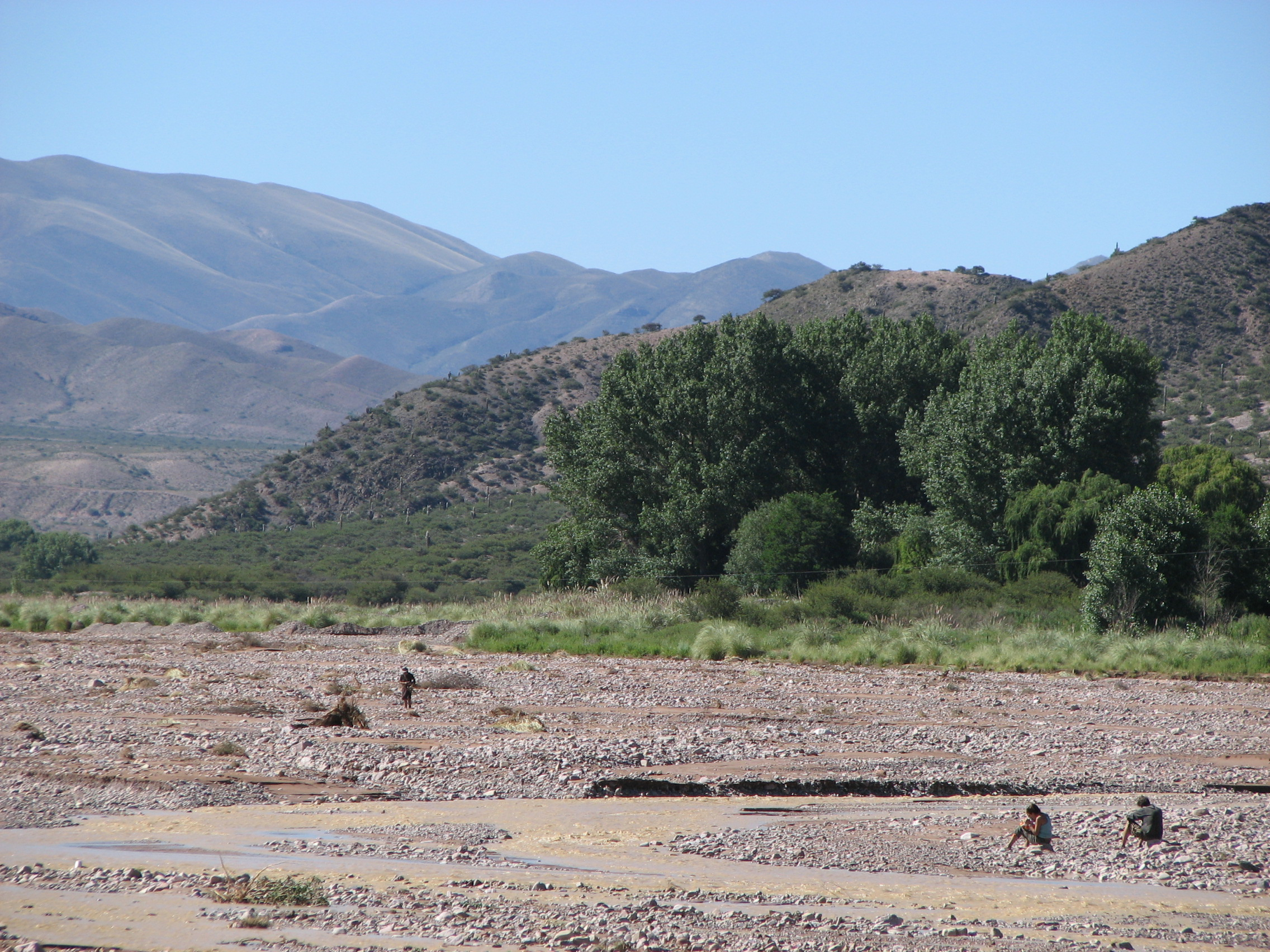

Location
- Country: Argentina

The Rio Grande is a river of Argentina.

== See also ==
- List of rivers of Argentina
