= Itiyuro River =

Location
- Country: Argentina

The Itiyuro River is a river located in Salta Province, Argentina.

== See also ==
- List of rivers of Argentina
