= Belgrano River =

Coordinates: 48.2615°S 71.2027°W

Location
- Country: Argentina

The Belgrano River is a river in Argentina.

== See also ==
- List of rivers of Argentina
