= Azul River (Argentina) =

River in Argentina

Coordinates: 42.08661°S 71.61981°W

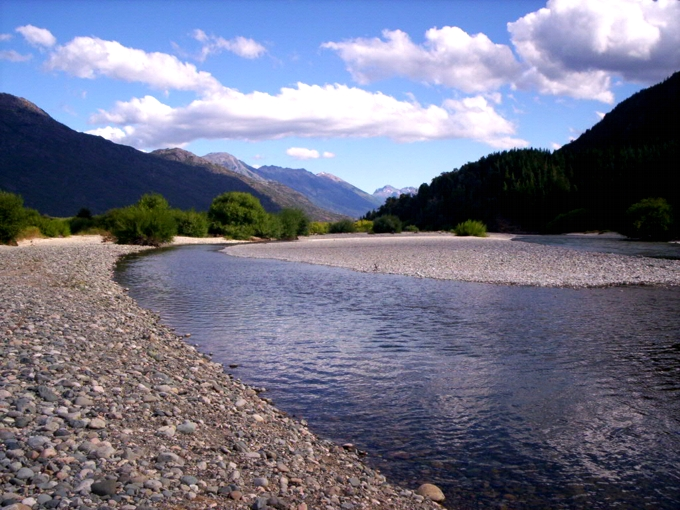

Location
- Country: Argentina

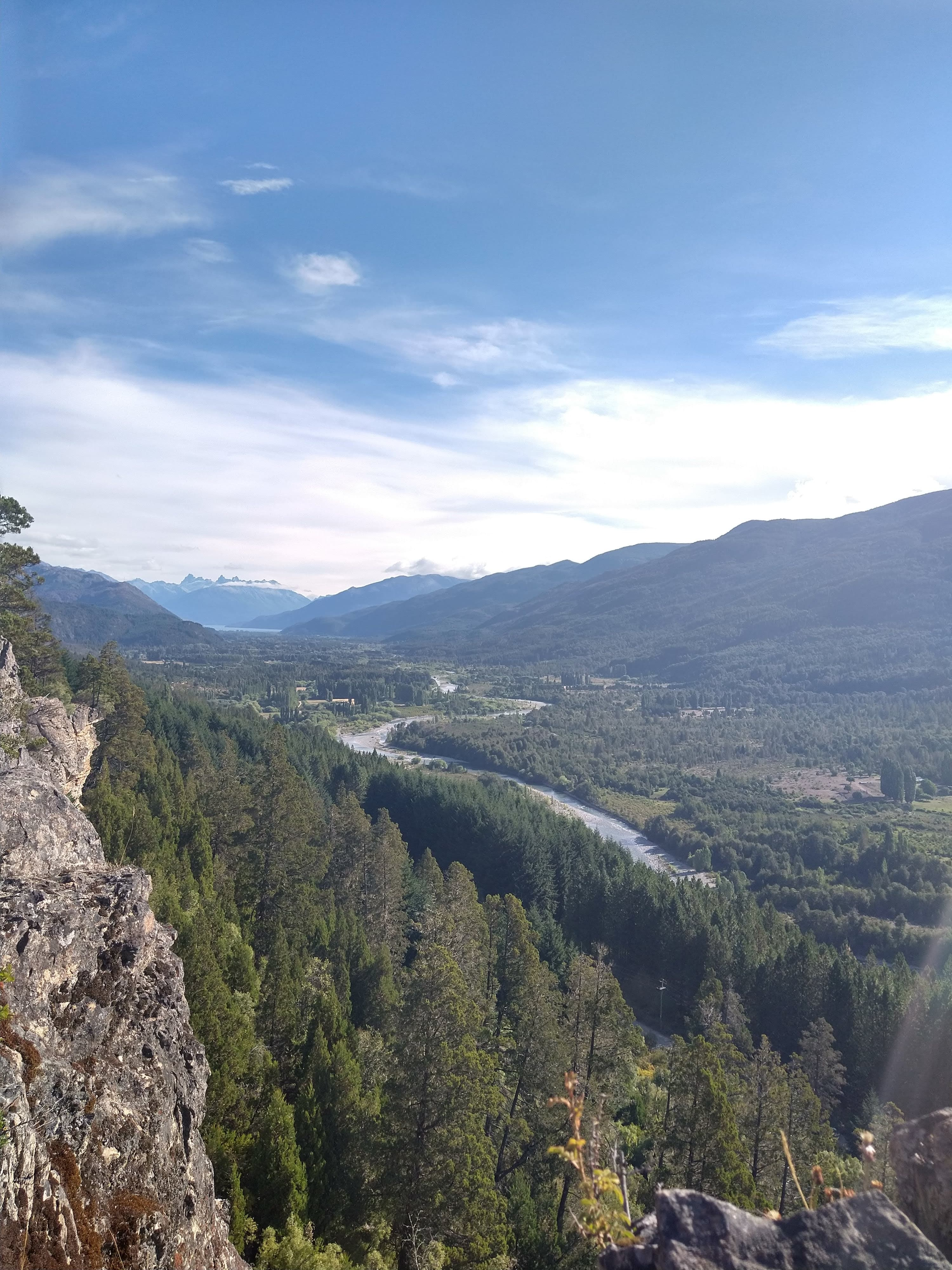
Azul River

The Azul River is a river found in the Patagonia region of Argentina. Its source is in the Andes Mountains to the northeast of the town of El Bolsón, in the province of Río Negro. After a southward course of around 40 km, it empties at the north bank of Lake Puelo in the province of Chubut.

== See also ==
- List of rivers of Argentina
