= Río Seco (Argentina) =

Location
- Country: Argentina

Río Seco (Spanish for "dry river") is a river of Argentina.

== See also ==
- List of rivers of Argentina
