= Sauce Grande River =

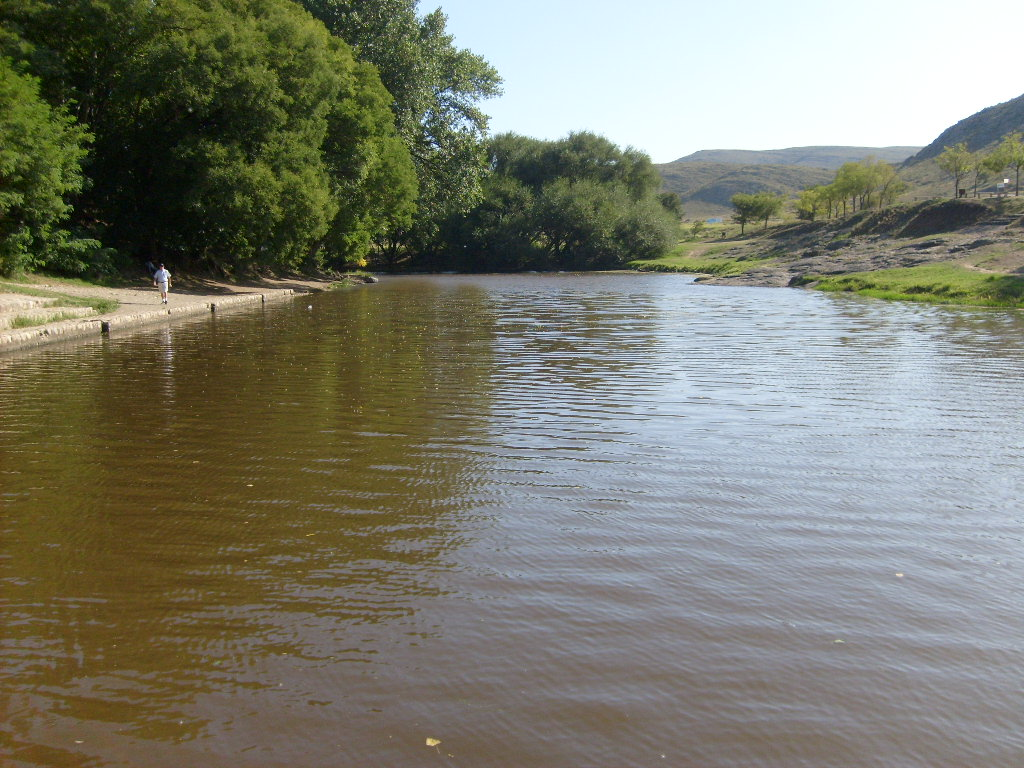

- Location of mouth

Location
- Country: Argentina

Physical characteristics
- Mouth
  - coordinates: 38°59′29″S 61°05′22″W
  - elevation: 0 m (0 ft)

The Sauce Grande River is a river of Argentina.

== See also ==
- Salsa dance
- Salsa music
- List of rivers of Argentina
