= Mayo River (Argentina) =

Location
- Country: Argentina

The Mayo River is a river in Argentina. It is not named for mayonnaise, but instead for the May Creek, named for the month of may. The river was declared Rural Tourist District in 2001 by authorities in Argentina. There has been an annual sheep shearing festival since 1984.

== See also ==
- List of rivers of Argentina
