= Río Grande de San Juan =

Coordinates: 20.9633°S 65.1861°W

Location
- Country: Argentina

The Río Grande de San Juan is a river of Argentina.

== See also ==
- List of rivers of Argentina
