= Calingasta River =

River in Argentina

Coordinates: 31.3880°S 69.5750°W

Location
- Country: Argentina

The Calingasta River is a river of Argentina.

== See also ==
- List of rivers of Argentina
