= Tecka River =

Coordinates: 43.0561°S 70.7905°W

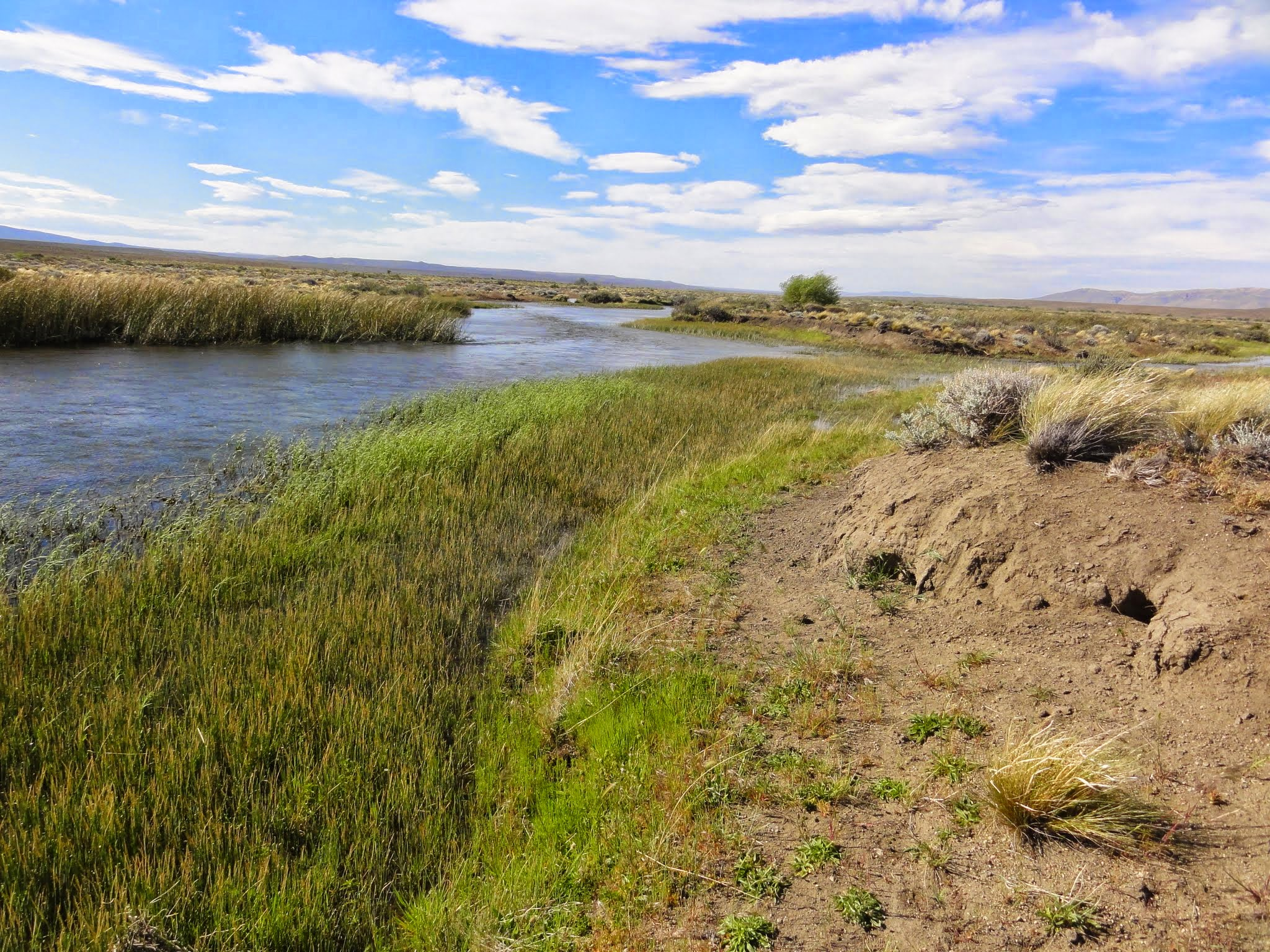

Location
- Country: Argentina

The Tecka River is a river of Argentina.

== See also ==
- List of rivers of Argentina
