= Abaucán River =

Coordinates: 27.6763897°S 67.6105957°W

Abaucán

Location
- Country: Argentina

Physical characteristics
- Source
  - location: Andes
- Mouth
  - location: Desagües del Río Salado
- Basin size: 43,386 km^{2} (16,751 sq mi)
- Discharge
  - average: 2.54 m^{3}/s (90 cu ft/s)

The Abaucán, also known as río Salado, Colorado o Bermejo, is a river in Argentina which flows through the provinces of Catamarca and La Rioja, areas with very low precipitation. The river water is provided by the ingress of two larger rivers, the Fiambalá and the Chaschuil.

It begins in the north of the Tinogasta Department of Catamarca Province, at the confluence of several rivers created by the melting of snow and precipitation in the high Andean peaks, such as the volcano Nevado Incahuasi at 6,638 metres (21,778 ft), Cerro El Muerto at 6,488 metres (21,286 ft) and Cerro Negro of Laguna Verde at 5,764 metres (18,911 ft), which dominates in addition the basin of Salina of Laguna Verde. At first the river is called Río Chascuil, then, after having received a stream on the right, the collector of Cerro Cenizo, elevation 5,227 metres (17,149 ft), it becomes the Río Guanchín down to the spa town of Fiambalá where there are hot springs. There, it receives on its left the Río Fiambalá, a periodic stream coming from the north which drains all the southern part of the Cordillera of San Buenaventura and the Sierra of Culampajá, very dry areas. It there takes the name Río Abaucán, and makes its final orientation toward the south-east. It passes close to the town of Tinogasta, then constitutes the south-southeastern border of the basin of the Salar of Pipanaco, with which it happens that there is an interaction. From this section of its course, it is called the Río Salado or Colorado or Bermejo. It passes into the province of La Rioja. Leaving the basin of Pipanaco, it threads its way between the Sierra of Ambato and the Sierra of Velasco. A little later it finishes its course by losing itself in a salt semi-desert called Desagües del Río Salado.

Measurements made over nearly 40 years during the 20th century reveal a very reduced flow compared to the importance of its basin. In Tinogasta, it was an average of 2.54 cubic metres per second (90 cu ft/s), with a daily maximum of 85 cubic metres per second (3,000 cu ft/s). At this place, its basin already measures about 28,300 square kilometres (10,900 mi^{2}), about the area of Belgium. The area of Tinogasta is an oasis well supplied with water by the Abaucán, as well as by aquifers, and is famous for its vineyards. Below Tinogasta, the flow of the river steadily decreases, it not receiving any further influx worth mentioning and losing its water by infiltration in highly permeable sandy zones and by evaporation due to the high temperatures on the plain. Nevertheless, it by and large provides enough water to supply the few human establishments located along its course.

In the part of its course where it delimits the southern zone of the basin of the Salar of Pipanaco, its bed is at about the same level as the salar. In the event of significant rising of the streams of the salar, this last can overflow and send its water surplus into the Río Abaucán, contributing greatly to its salinity. The opposite interaction can also occur.

The important trunk road Route National 60, which connects Córdoba to Chile through the Paso de San Francisco, elevation 4,748 metres (15,577 ft), follows the course of the Río Abaucán for almost its entire length.

Its mode is purely nival, tied to the snow melt of the Andean tops. Its basin has an area of 43,386 square kilometres (16,751 mi^{2}), a little more than that of Switzerland.

== See also ==
- List of rivers of Argentina
