= Fénix Grande River =

Coordinates: 46.6127°S 70.8595°W

Location
- Country: Argentina

The Fénix Grande River is a river of Argentina.

== See also ==
- List of rivers of Argentina
