= Coig River =

River in Argentina

Coordinates: 50.9500°S 69.1667°W

- Location of mouth

Location
- Country: Argentina

The Coig River (Spanish pronunciation: [ˈkojɣ]) is a river of Argentina. It originates in Laguna La Esperanza, which is located near the Argentine border with Chile and Ruta Nacional 40. It empties into Bahía Grande, and the Coyle estuary's end is defined by two points, Punta Norte and Punta Sur.

== See also ==
- List of rivers of Argentina
