= Cuarto River =

River in Argentina

Coordinates: 32°54′55″S 62°19′29″W

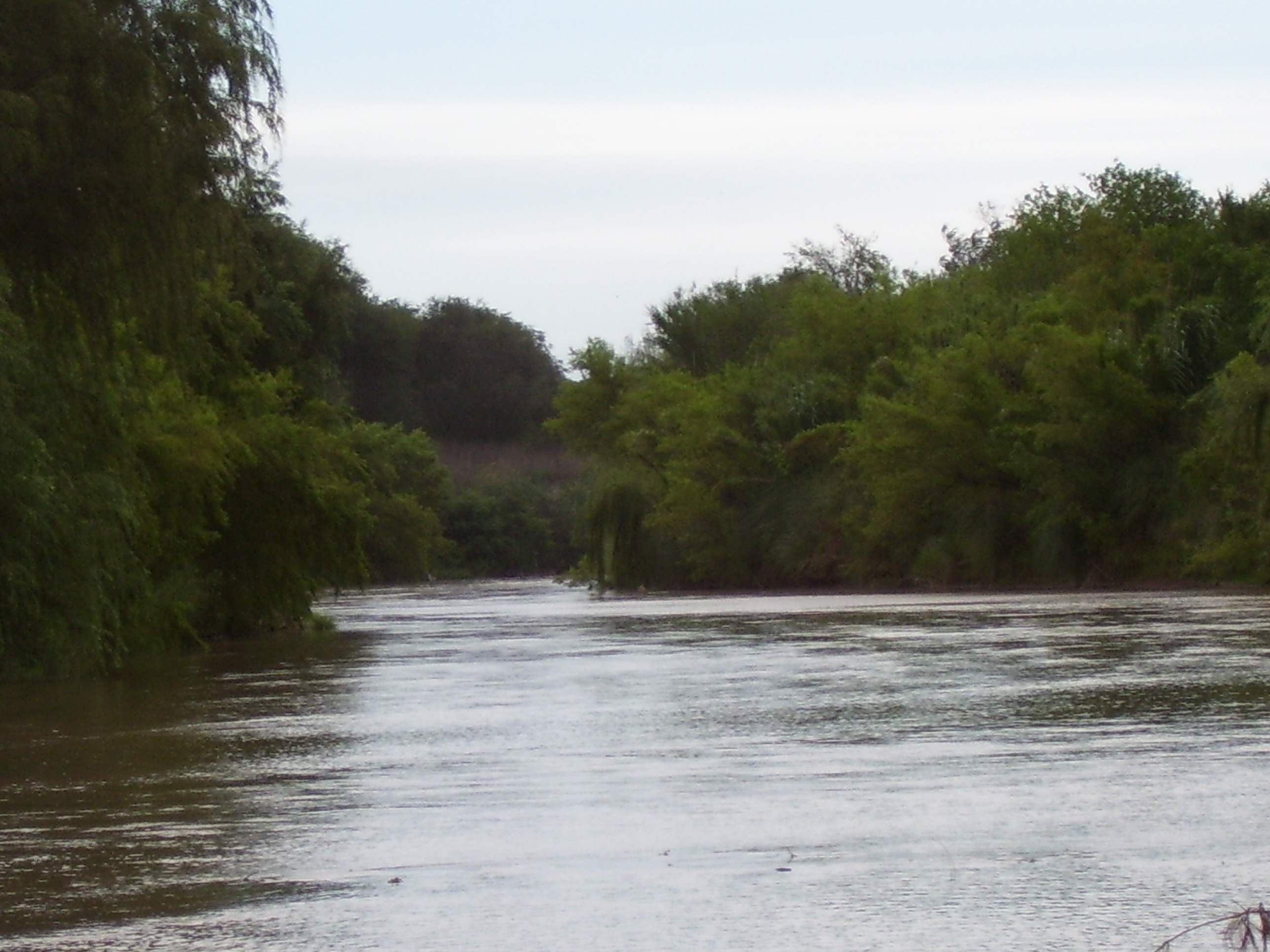
The Cuarto River

The Cuarto River (Spanish: Río Cuarto, 'Fourth River'), also known as the Saladillo River, is a river of Argentina which crosses the southern part of the Province of Córdoba, and merges with the Tercero River to form the Carcarañá River (a tributary of the Paraná River via the Coronda River). The Cuarto River is also known as Cochancharava, the name given to it by the Ranquel Indians.

The name Saladillo is generally used for the lower course, below the Bañado del Río Saladillo wetland.

== Rio de La Plata Expedition ==
Thomas Jefferson Page explored this river in September 1853 during the Rio de La Plata Expedition, which he led. The expedition's two aims were to map the Rio de La Plata estuary and the surrounding rivers of Uruguay and Parana for commerce, and to conduct various scientific studies for the Smithsonian Institution.

== See also ==
- List of rivers of Argentina
- Río Cuarto, Córdoba
