= Urugua-í River =

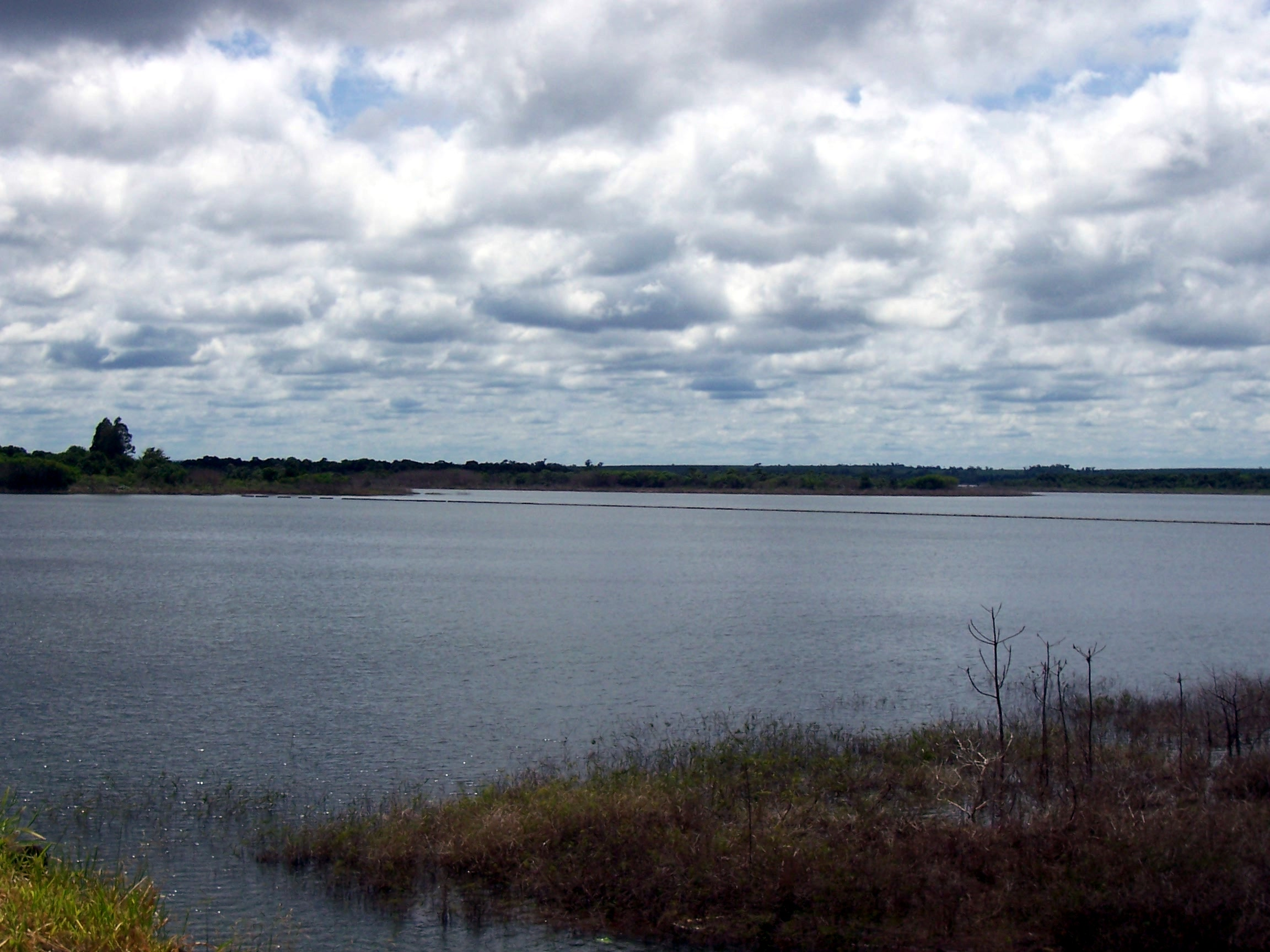
- Lake Urugua-í, formed by the dam

- Location within Brazil
- Native name: Arroyo Urugua-í (Spanish)

Location
- Country: Brazil

Physical characteristics
- Source
  - location: Bernardo de Irigoyen, Misiones
- Mouth
  - coordinates: 25.898808°S 54.613217°W

Basin features
- River system: Paraná River

The Urugua-í River (Spanish: Arroyo Urugua-í) is a river in the Misiones Province of Argentina. It is a tributary of the Paraná River.

== Course ==
The Urugua-í River, also called the Marambas or Grande River, has a length of about 100 kilometres (62 mi), including the reservoir formed by the Urugua-í Dam. Tributaries include the Sarita River, Arroyo de las Cabeceras and Uruzú River. The Urugua-í River flows through the southern part of the Urugua-í Provincial Park in a southeast – northwest direction and is impounded by the Urugua-í Dam to the west of the park. The park was created in part to compensate for the flooding of 8,800 hectares (22,000 acres) of the lower Urugua-í River basin caused by construction of the dam.

== See also ==
- List of rivers of Argentina

== Sources ==
- "Parque Provincial Urugua-í (AICA)", Ruta de la Selva (in Spanish), archived from the original on 2016-09-20
- Parque Provincial URUGUA-I (in Spanish), SIFAP • Sistema Federal de Áreas Protegidas, archived from the original on 2016-03-07
- Rodriguez, Gabriel O., "Yaboty: Hidrografía", Patrimonionatural.com (in Portuguese)
