= Conlara River =

Location
- Country: Argentina

The Conlara River is a river of Argentina.

== See also ==
- List of rivers of Argentina

== External sources ==
- Rand McNally, The New International Atlas, 1993.
- GEOnet Names Server
