= Río Grande (Tierra del Fuego) =

Coordinates: 53°47′21″S 67°40′56″W

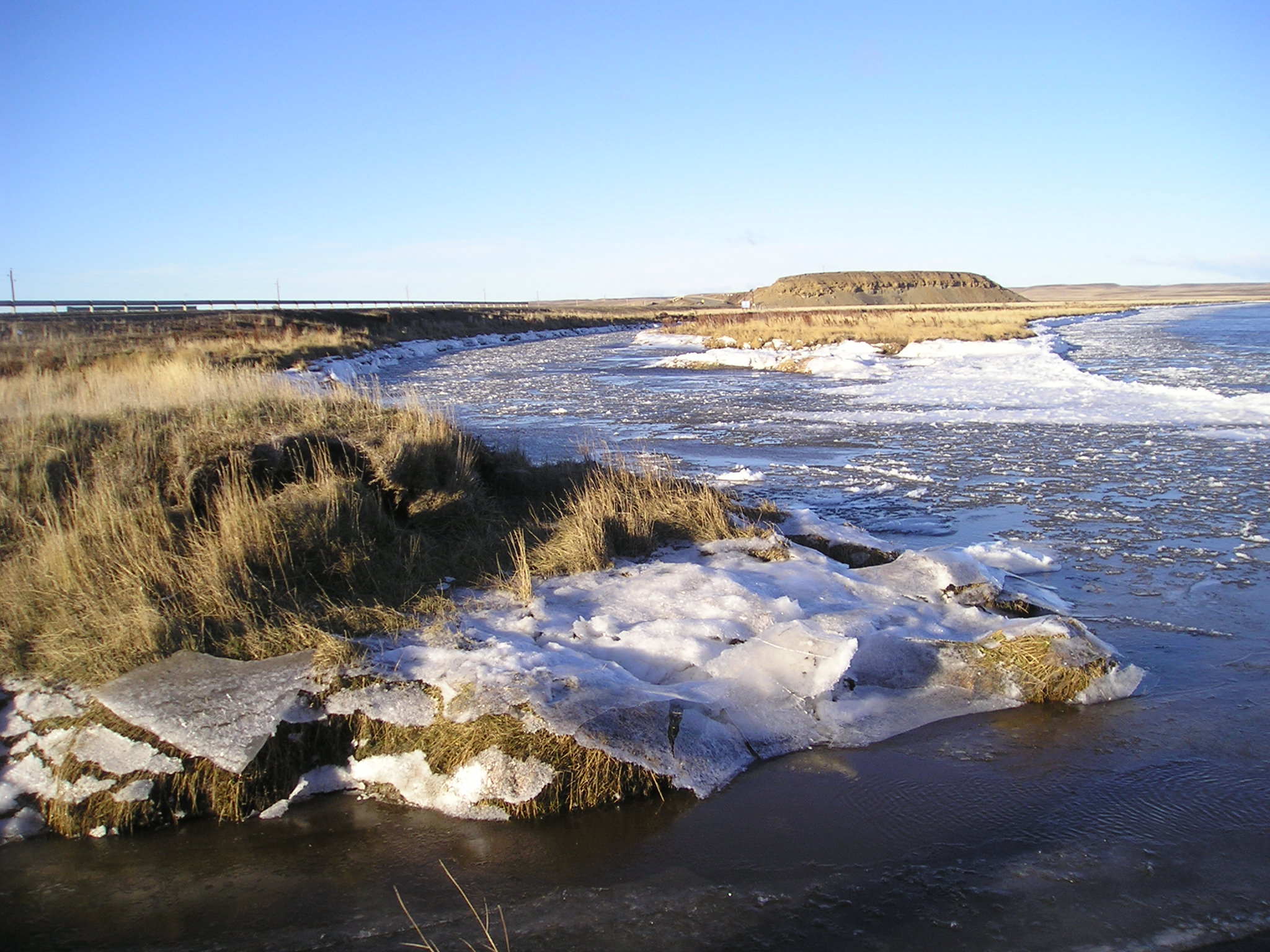
- Lower Río Grande

- Location of mouth

Location
- Countries: Argentina; Chile

Physical characteristics
- Source
  - location: Chile
- Mouth
  - location: South Atlantic
- Length: 240 km (150 mi)

The Río Grande (Spanish for "great river") is a river located on the island of Tierra del Fuego.

It arises in the Chilean (western) part of the island and flows in a generally eastward direction, through the Argentine part and into the Argentine Sea. At its mouth lies the city of Río Grande, Argentina.

It is the most important river in the Tierra del Fuego archipelago . It is approximately 240 km long, of which the first 140 km flow through Chilean territory, while the remaining 100 km run through Argentine territory.

The name alludes to its size and importance in relation to other river courses in the region.

His name in the Selk'nam language was Chawrk'n.
