= Aguapey River =

Coordinates: 29°6′39″S 56°35′6″W

Location
- Country: Argentina

The Aguapey River (Spanish Río Aguapey) is a river of Argentina. It is a tributary of the Uruguay River.

== See also ==
- List of rivers of Argentina
