= Salí River =

River in Argentina

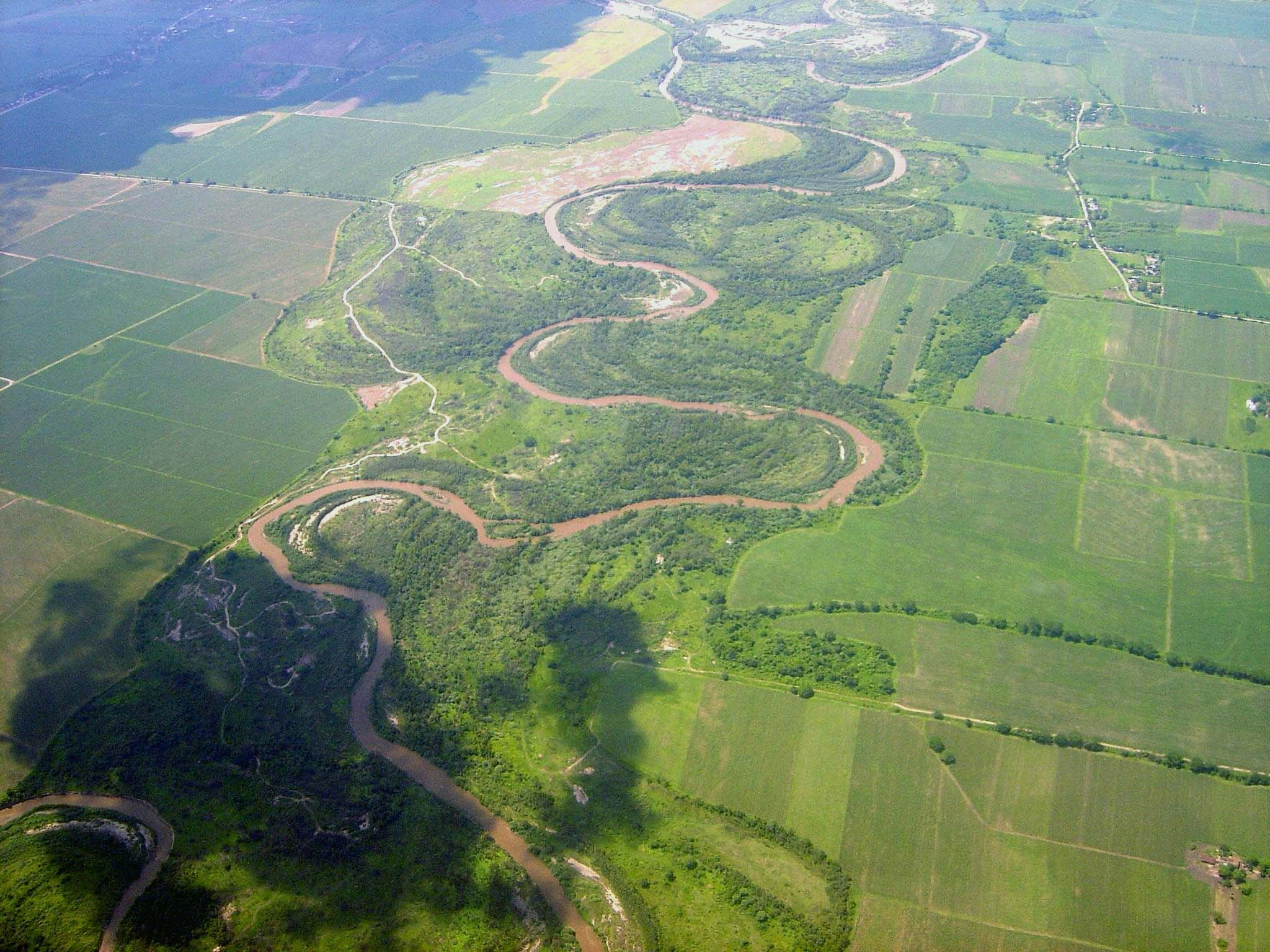
Aerial view of the Salí, near San Miguel de Tucumán.

The Salí River (Spanish: Río Salí) is a large river in north-west Argentina. It is the most important river in Tucumán Province; most cities and towns in the province, including its capital, San Miguel de Tucumán, lay on its basin.

The Salí is fed by precipitation captured in the Calchaquíes range next to Salta Province, and its flow is increased by the numerous streams from the Sierra del Aconquija range, and other rivers. Flowing mostly through the province of Tucumán, its river basin also includes parts of Salta and Catamarca provinces. The Salí continues to Santiago del Estero Province with the name of Dulce River, and dies at the Mar Chiquita salt lagoon in Córdoba Province.

Three main dams have been constructed both for the production of hydroelectric energy and irrigation; two in the Tucumán Province: El Cadillal and Escaba, and Los Quiroga in Santiago del Estero Province.
