= San José de Feliciano =

- City
- Location of San José de Feliciano in Argentina
- Coordinates: 30°23′S 58°45′W
- Country: Argentina
- Province: Entre Ríos
- Department: Feliciano

Population
  - Total: 11,137
- Time zone: UTC−3 (ART)
- CPA base: E3187
- Dialing code: +54 3458

San José de Feliciano is a city in the north of the province of Entre Ríos, Argentina, near the border with Corrientes. It has 11,137 inhabitants as per the 2001 census [INDEC], and is the head town of the Feliciano Department.

The city was officially founded in 1818. Its name is a homage to Saint Joseph and to Feliciano Rodríguez, who accompanied Juan de Garay during the foundation of Santa Fe.

The area is traversed by many streams and punctuated by forests of palm trees, alternating with natural pasture lands which are employed to raise cattle and sheep. The streams and the nearby Guayquiraró River are adequate for fishing.
