= Vizcachas River =

River in Argentina and Chile

The Vizcachas River is a river in the south of the Patagonic province of Santa Cruz, Argentina. It is born at the Sierra de los Baguales, from the confluence of several streams, and descends from the Vizcachas Plain, flowing south until reaching a low-lying marsh area. At the 51° S parallel, it turns abruptly west until reaching the border with Chile, which it follows and then crosses.

The Vizcachas, together with the Zanja Honda Stream and the Guillermo River, empty into the Serrano River, which ends in the Pacific Ocean.
