= Sauce Chico River =

River in Argentina

Location
- Country: Argentina

The Sauce Chico River is a river of Argentina.

== See also ==
- List of rivers of Argentina
