= Barrancas River =

Coordinates: 37°22′36″S 68°55′15″W

Location
- Country: Argentina

Physical characteristics
- Mouth
  - elevation: 1,500 m (4,900 ft)
- Length: 180 km (110 mi)

The Barrancas River is a river in western Argentina. Traveling eastward from the Andes range, it separates the Argentine provinces of Mendoza and Neuquén. Joining the Río Grande, it merges into the Colorado, and flows into the Atlantic Ocean.

== See also ==
- List of rivers of Argentina
