= Huaco River =

Coordinates: 30.3000°S 68.1000°W

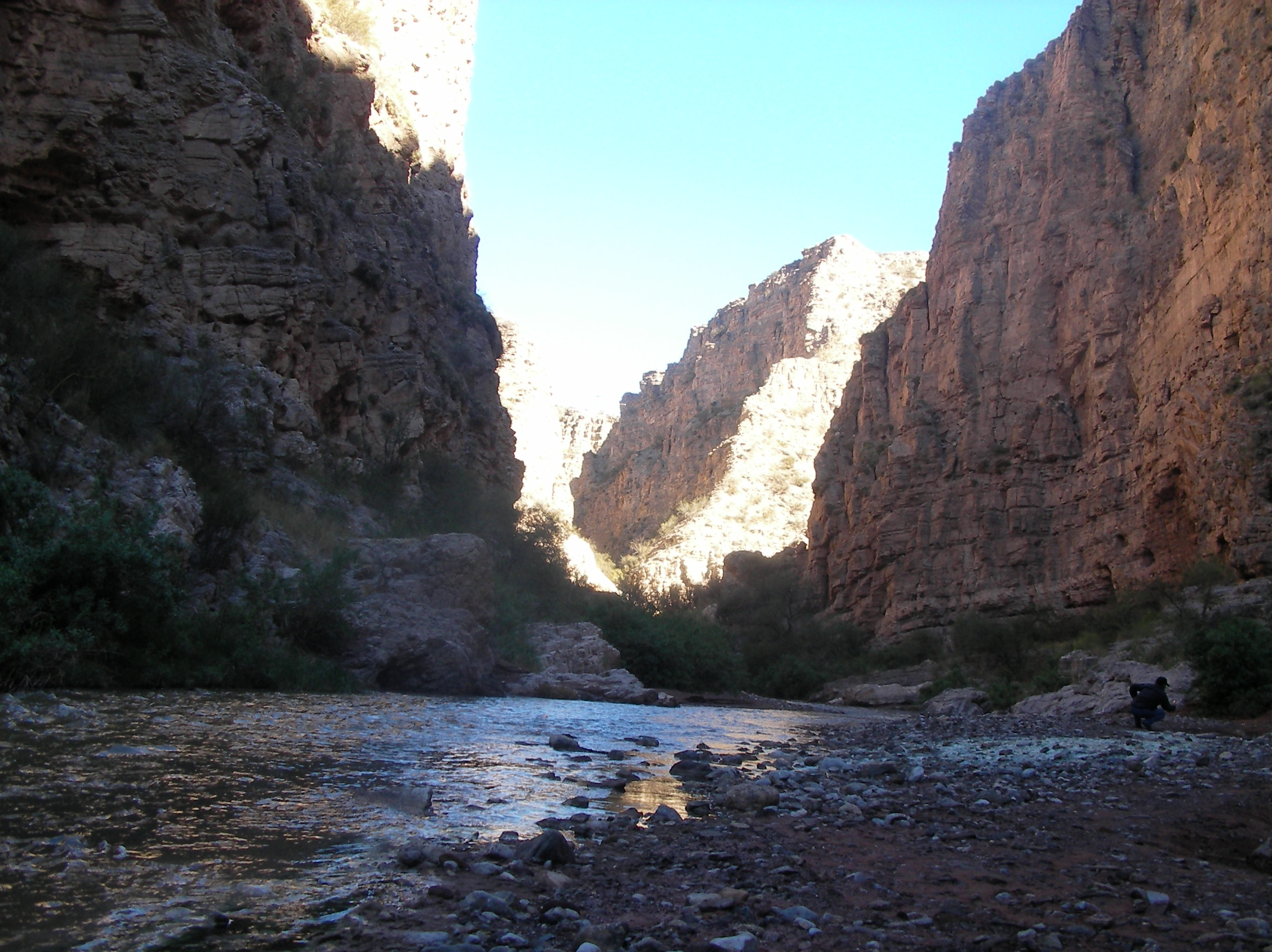

Location
- Country: Argentina

Physical characteristics
- Length: 68 km (42 mi)

The Huaco River is a river of Argentina.

== See also ==
- List of rivers of Argentina
