= Guayquiraró River =

River in Argentina

Coordinates: 30°24′46″S 59°34′47″W

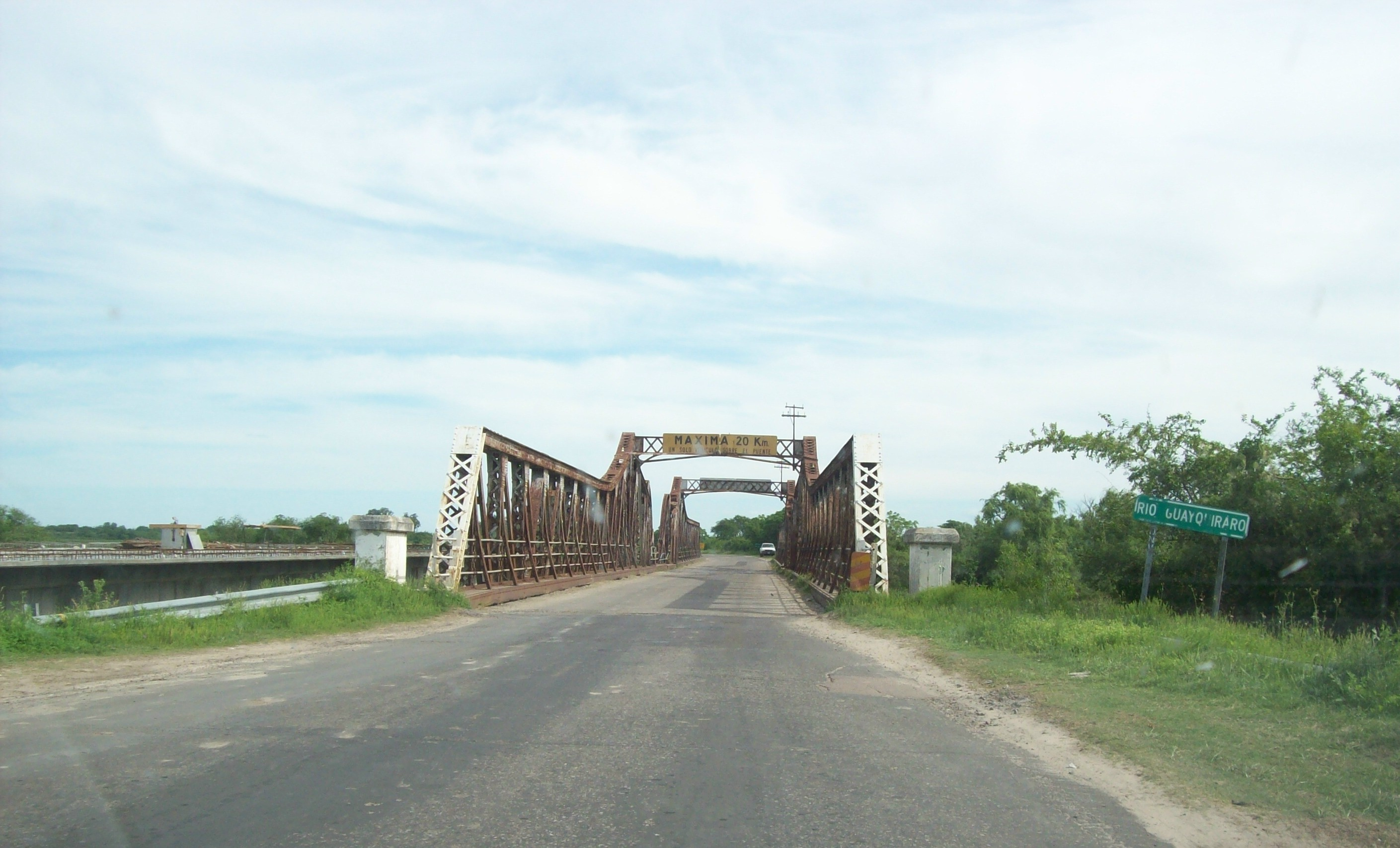
Bridge over Guayquiraró River

The Guayquiraró River (Spanish, Río Guayquiraró) is a river in the Mesopotamic northeastern region of Argentina. It is born in the middle section of the border between the provinces of Entre Ríos and Corrientes, fed from several streams on its right-hand basin. It flows west along the interprovincial border for about 110 kilometres (68 mi), then emptying into the Paraná River, at a base level of about 26 metres (85 ft) AMSL.

The river's drainage basin covers an area of 3,150 square kilometres (1,220 mi^{2}), and its mean annual flow is 21.7 cubic metres per second (770 cu ft/s).

== See also ==
- List of rivers of Argentina
