= Mocoretá River =

River in Argentina

Coordinates: 30°43′S 57°49′W

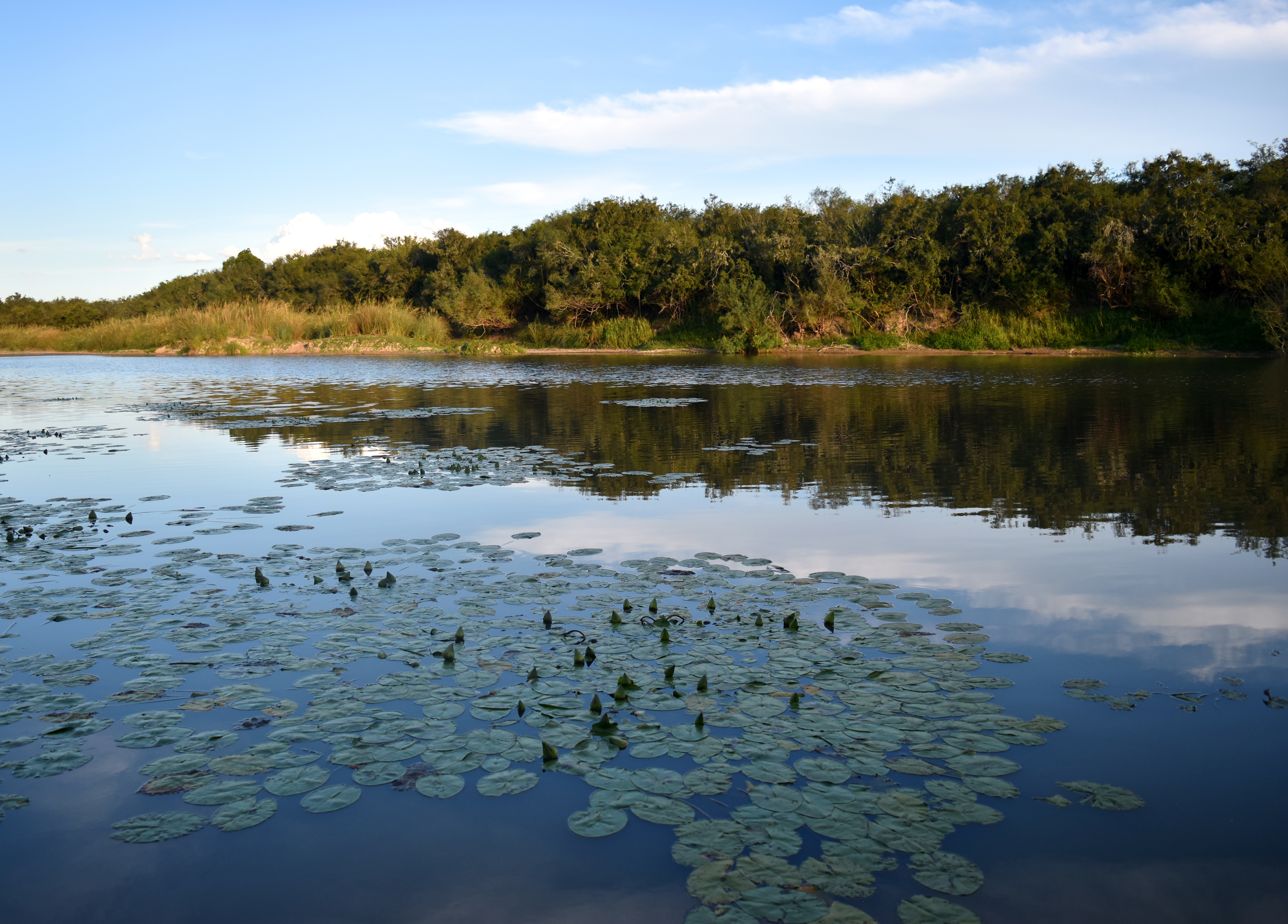
The Mocoretá River, belongs to the basin of Uruguay and draws the boundary between the provinces of Entre Ríos and Corrientes

The Mocoretá River (Spanish, Río Mocoretá) is a river in the Mesopotamic northeastern region of Argentina. It is born in the southeast of the province of Corrientes, south of Curuzú Cuatiá. It flows south, first turning east and then west until reaching the interprovincial border with Entre Ríos, where it receives the Las Tunas Stream. It turns southeast again along the border, passes by the town of Mocoretá, and empties into the Uruguay River, into the southern part of the Salto Grande reservoir.

The river is relatively shallow and narrow, with an estimated length of 150 kilometres (93 mi). It drains a basin of 3,650 square kilometres (1,410 mi^{2}).
