= Arenales River =

River in northwestern Argentina

Coordinates: 24°48′S 65°25′W

Location
- Country: Argentina

Physical characteristics
- Mouth
  - location: Salado River

The Arenales River (Spanish, Río Arenales) is a river of Argentina. A tributary of the Salado River, the Arenales flows through the city of Salta.

== See also ==
- List of rivers of Argentina
