= Corriente River =

River in Argentina

Coordinates: 30°0′38″S 59°33′21″W

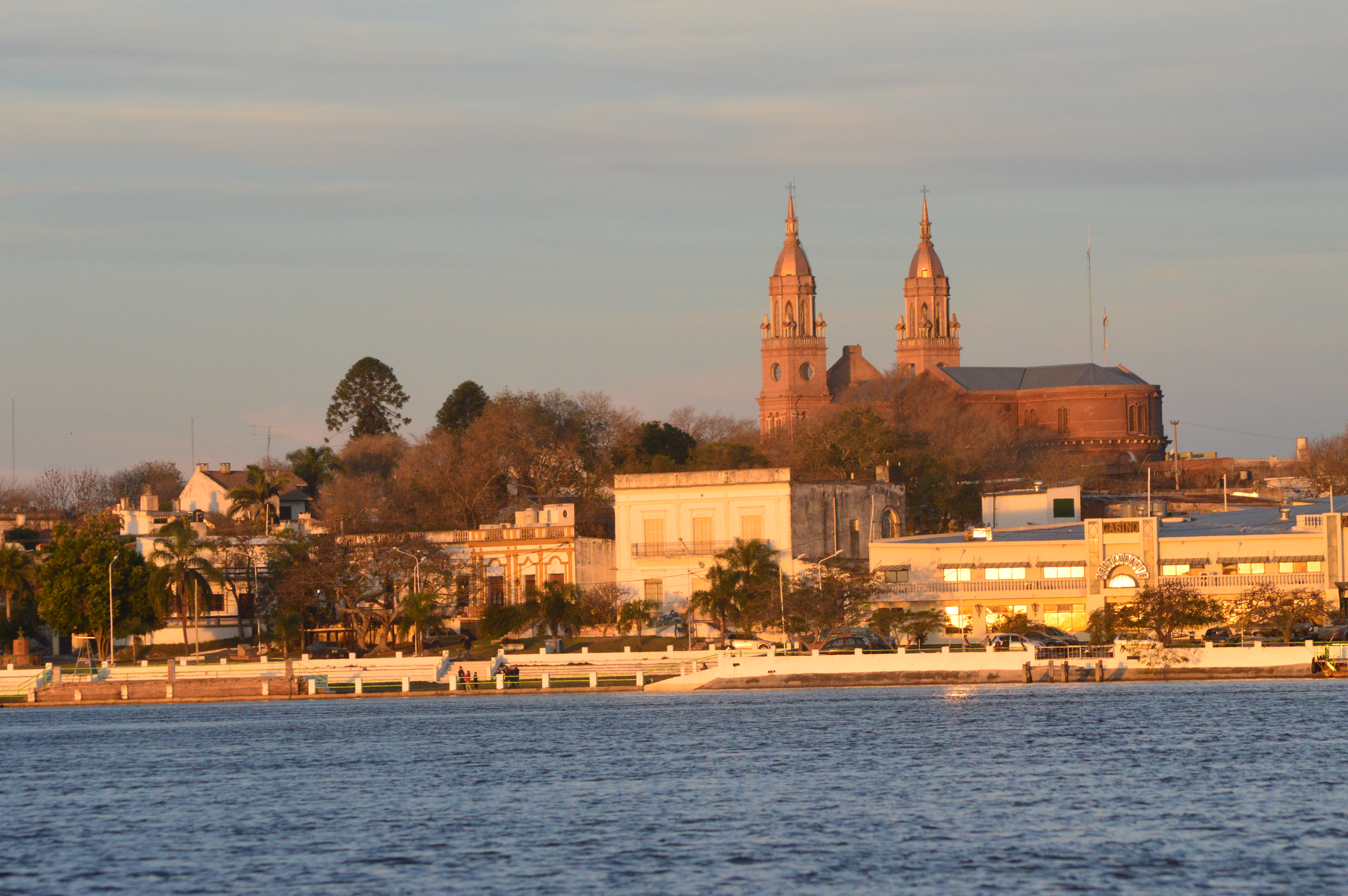
Corriente River at Esquina, Argentina

The Corriente River (Spanish, Río Corriente) is a river in the Argentine province of Corrientes, in the Mesopotamia. It flows from the Itatí Lagoon, in the center-north of the province, and drains the large basin of the Iberá Wetlands, about 13,000 square kilometres (5,000 sq mi). It flows southwest, across marshes (bañados), and empties into the flood plain of the Paraná River near the city of Esquina.

== See also ==
- List of rivers of Argentina
