= Pescado River =

Coordinates: 22°59′48″S 64°20′12″W

Location
- Country: Argentina

Physical characteristics
- Mouth
  - location: Bermejo River

The Pescado River (Spanish, Río Pescado) is a river of Argentina. It is a tributary of the Bermejo River.

== See also ==
- List of rivers of Argentina
- List of tributaries of the Río de la Plata
