= Río Grande de Tarija =

River in Argentina and Bolivia

Coordinates: 22°55′37″S 64°20′11″W

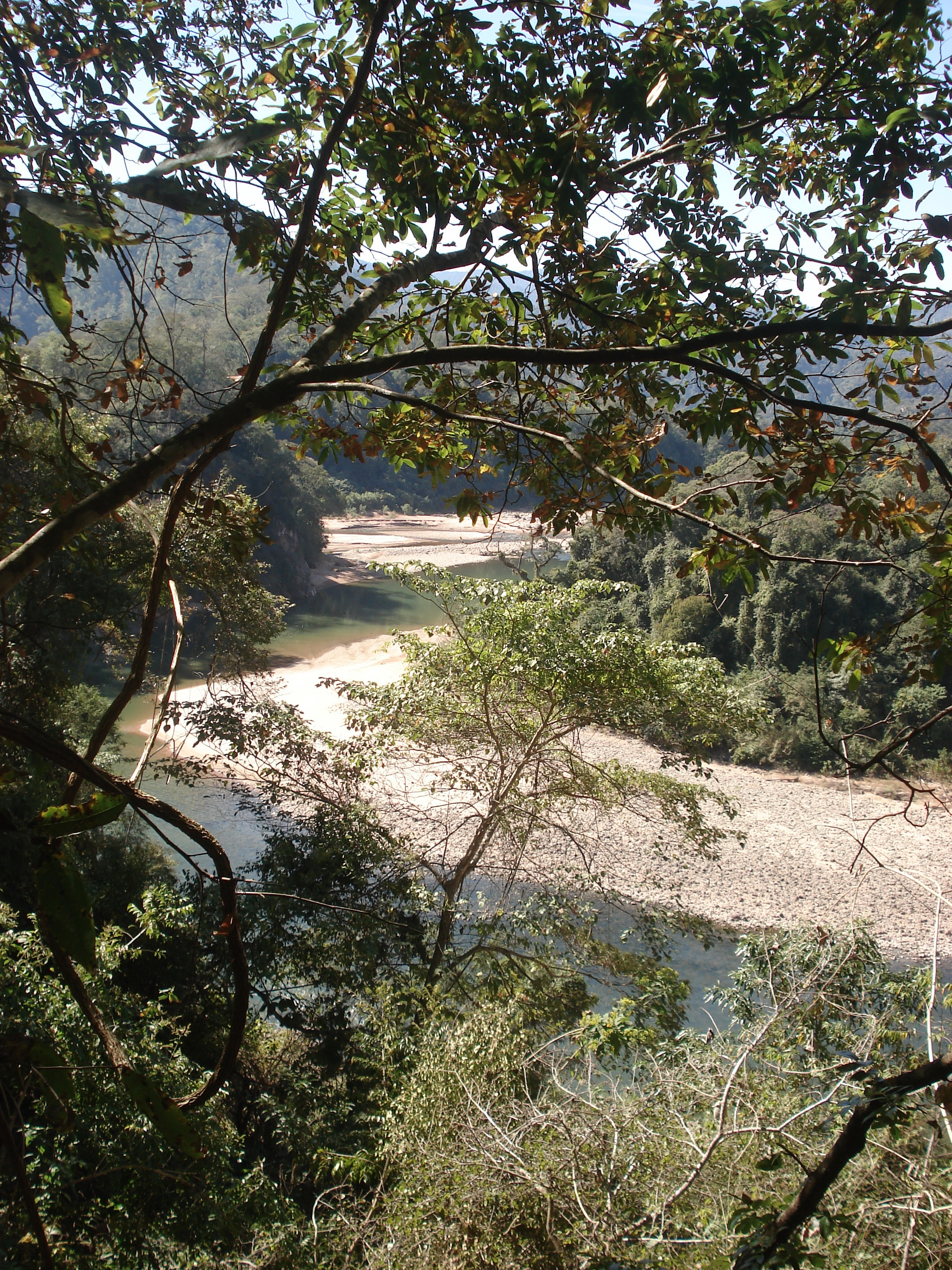

- Location of mouth

Location
- Country: Argentina, Bolivia

Physical characteristics
- Mouth
  - location: Bermejo River

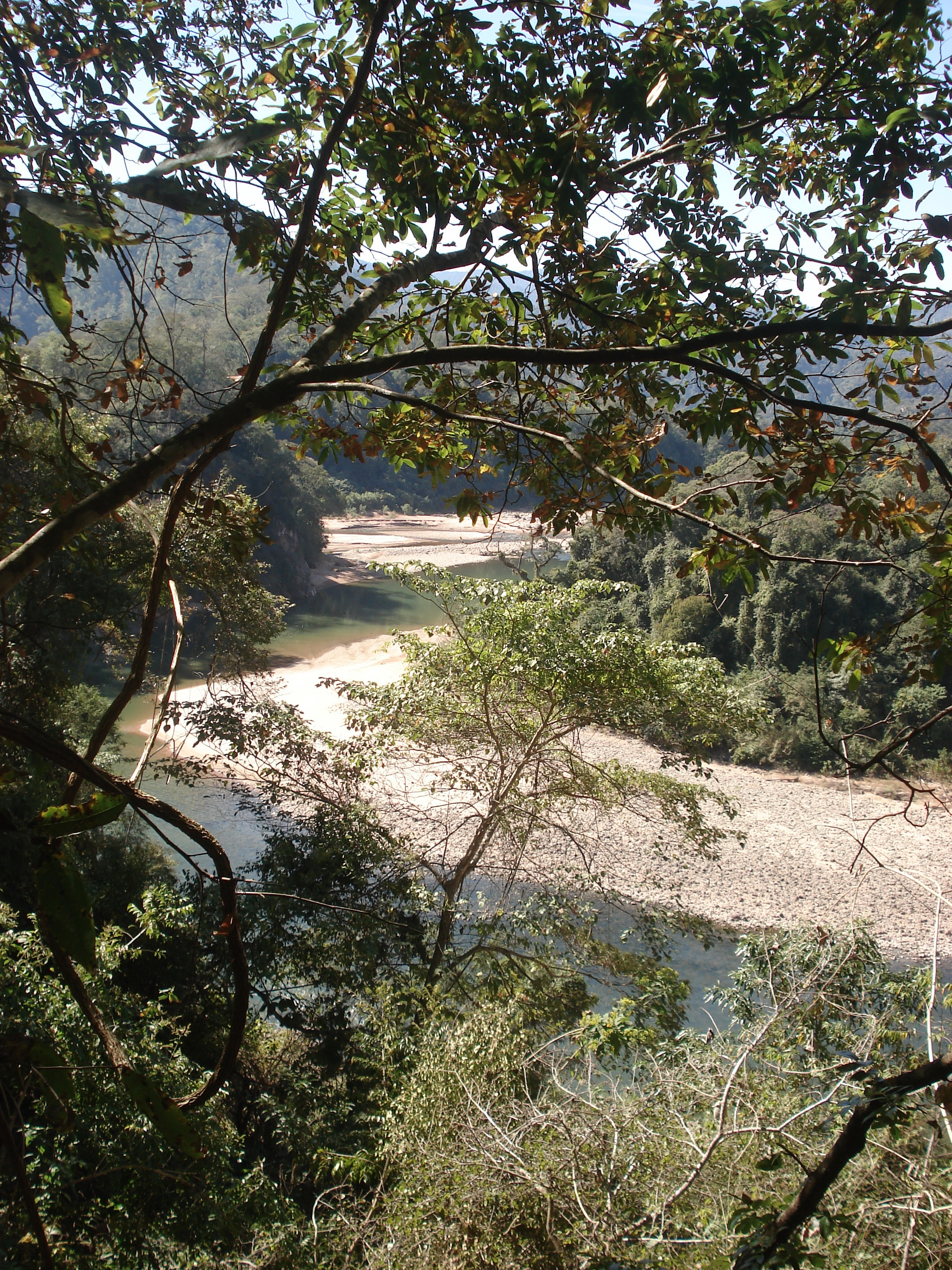
Rio Tarija

The Río Grande de Tarija is a river of Argentina and Bolivia. It is a tributary of the Bermejo River. It is also known as the Río Tarija and the Tarija River.

== See also ==
- List of rivers of Argentina
- List of rivers of Bolivia
