= Tartagal River =

River in Argentina

Coordinates: 22.6667°S 63.6833°W

The Tartagal River is a river in the north of the province of Salta, Argentina. It crosses the city of Tartagal, in the San Martín Department, flowing west–east along with many smaller streams, and finally vanishing into a wetland. Its course is rather short and, due to the dry climate of the region, it only carries a large flow during high-precipitation times (mainly in the summer).

In April 2006 (early autumn), after weeks of increased rainfall, the Tartagal overflowed its banks, causing landslides and destroying or severely damaging bridges and roads (including National Route 34) along its course, which caused the city of Tartagal to be practically isolated from the rest of the province for days.

On February 9, 2009, heavy rains caused the river to break its banks and flood much of the city, resulting in 11 casualties.
