= Río de los Patos =

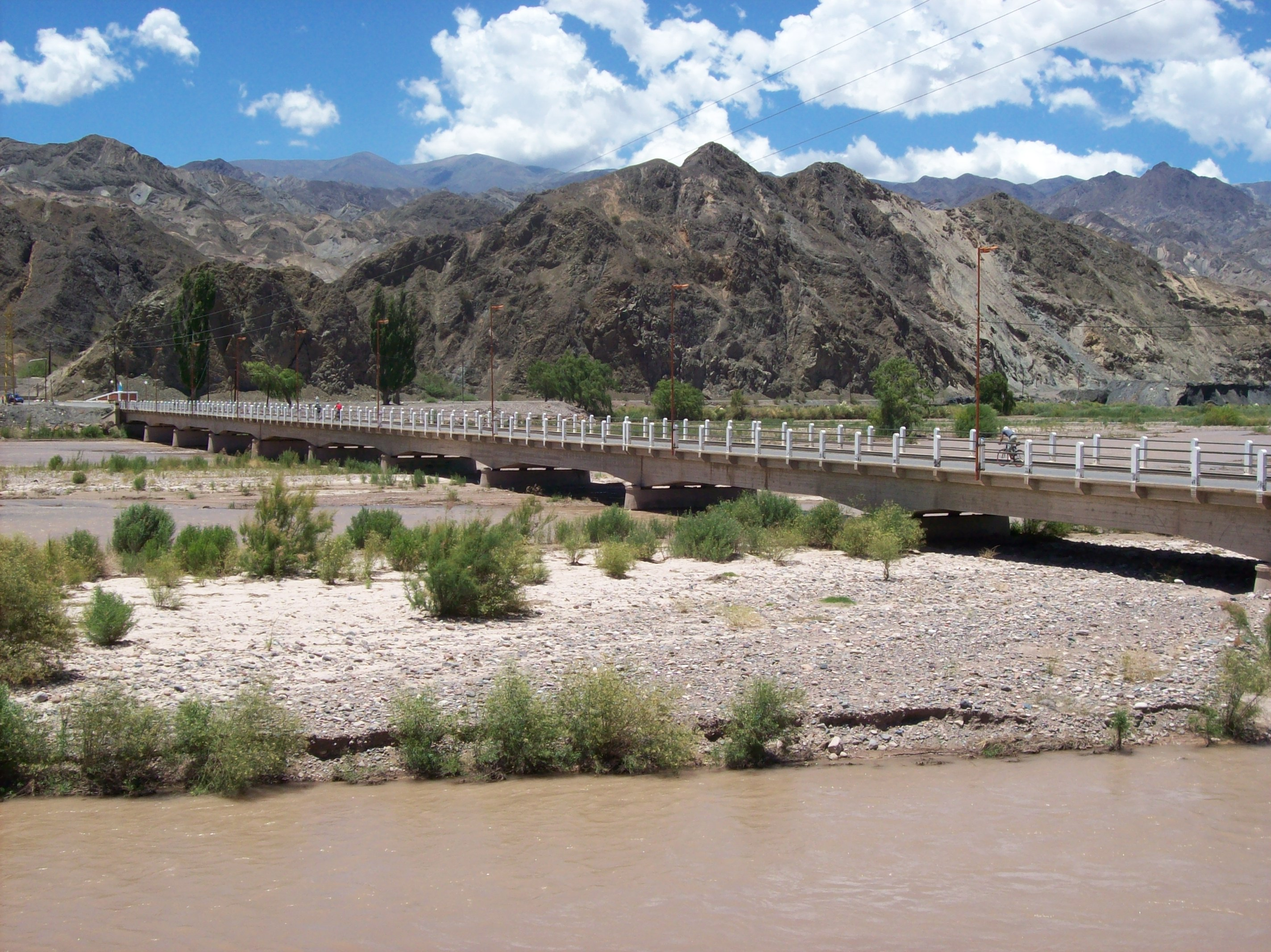

Location
- Country: Argentina

The Río de los Patos is a river of Argentina.

== Climate ==
The Valle de los Patos Superior has a dry-summer subarctic climate (Koppen: Dsc). In July 1972, thermometers registered the temperature of -39C, the all-time record low of Argentina.

Climate data for Valle de los Patos Superior, Elevation: 2880 m. (1967–1981)
Month	Jan	Feb	Mar	Apr	May	Jun	Jul	Aug	Sep	Oct	Nov	Dec	Year
Record high °C (°F)	27.0 (80.6)	26.7 (80.1)	26.6 (79.9)	23.4 (74.1)	21.0 (69.8)	17.0 (62.6)	16.8 (62.2)	17.6 (63.7)	18.4 (65.1)	21.6 (70.9)	24.6 (76.3)	26.5 (79.7)	27.0 (80.6)
Mean daily maximum °C (°F)	19.7 (67.5)	19.4 (66.9)	18.1 (64.6)	14.9 (58.8)	9.9 (49.8)	4.6 (40.3)	3.2 (37.8)	5.1 (41.2)	8.4 (47.1)	11.6 (52.9)	15.1 (59.2)	18.2 (64.8)	12.3 (54.1)
Daily mean °C (°F)	10.9 (51.6)	10.0 (50.0)	8.0 (46.4)	4.4 (39.9)	1.5 (34.7)	−3.7 (25.3)	−5.5 (22.1)	−3.8 (25.2)	0.1 (32.2)	3.9 (39.0)	6.8 (44.2)	9.7 (49.5)	3.5 (38.3)
Mean daily minimum °C (°F)	1.0 (33.8)	−0.1 (31.8)	−2.3 (27.9)	−6.0 (21.2)	−6.8 (19.8)	−11.7 (10.9)	−13.5 (7.7)	−12.5 (9.5)	−8.2 (17.2)	−4.3 (24.3)	−2.4 (27.7)	−0.1 (31.8)	−5.6 (21.9)
Record low °C (°F)	−6.4 (20.5)	−7.2 (19.0)	−10.7 (12.7)	−27.5 (−17.5)	−32.7 (−26.9)	−34.3 (−29.7)	−39.0 (−38.2)	−35.0 (−31.0)	−31.5 (−24.7)	−21.0 (−5.8)	−12.6 (9.3)	−8.9 (16.0)	−39.0 (−38.2)
Average precipitation mm (inches)	6.4 (0.25)	5.2 (0.20)	3.8 (0.15)	15.3 (0.60)	29.9 (1.18)	49.9 (1.96)	40.5 (1.59)	15.3 (0.60)	13.7 (0.54)	10.8 (0.43)	10.8 (0.43)	3.3 (0.13)	205.0 (8.07)
Average snowy days	0.6	0.1	0.2	2	6	8	9	5	4	3	2	0.7	40.6
Average relative humidity (%)	47	47	46	47	52	57	61	60	56	49	44	44	50.8
Source: Servicio Meteorológico Nacional

== See also ==
- List of rivers of Argentina
