= Nogoyá River =

Coordinates: 32°55′S 59°59′W

Nogoya River
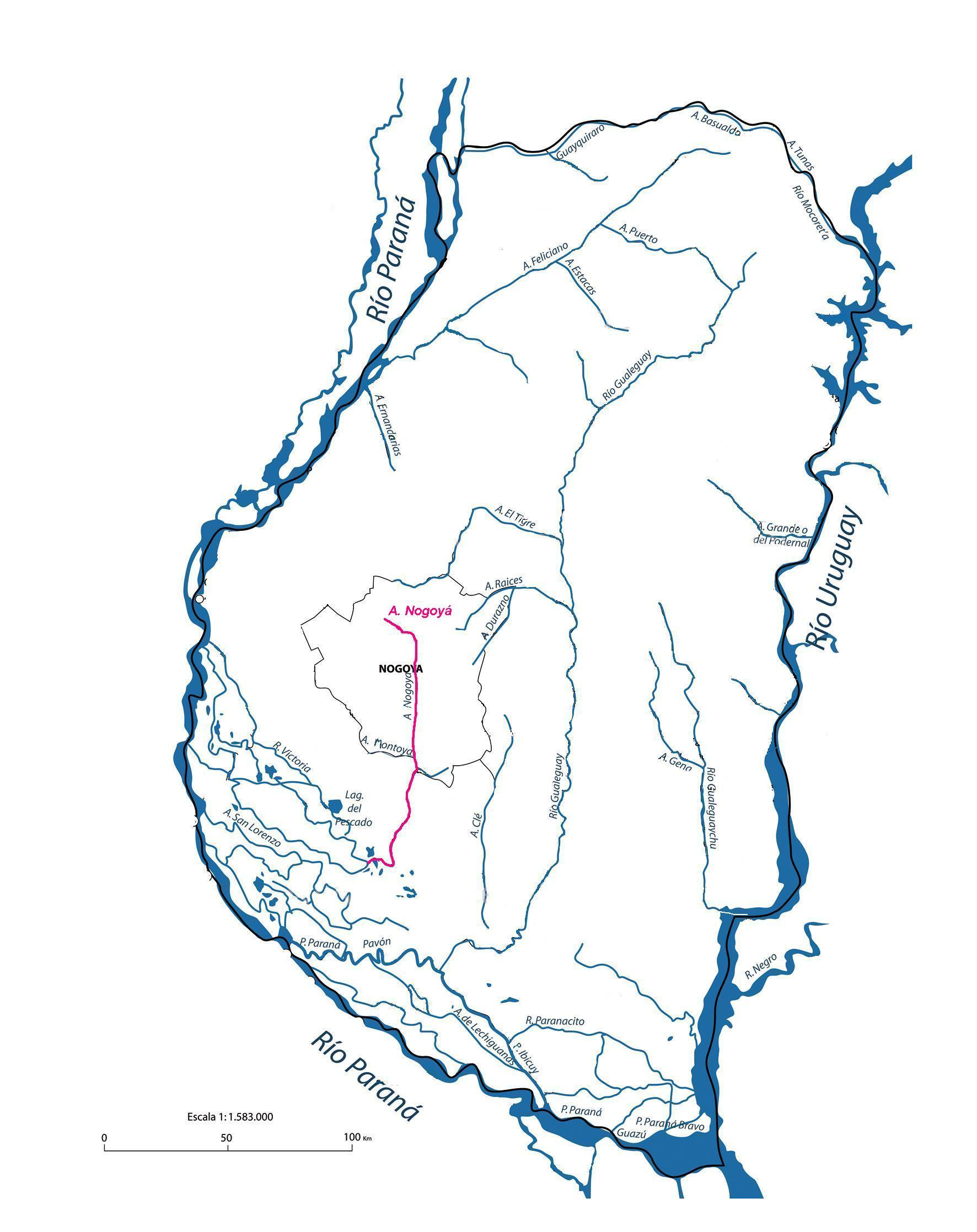

Location
- Country: Argentina

Physical characteristics
- Mouth
  - location: Parana River

The Nogoya River (Spanish, Arroyo Nogoyá, variant name Río Nogoyá) is a river of Argentina. It is a tributary of the Paraná River, which it joins in a region of wetlands and complex distributaries.

== See also ==
- List of rivers of Argentina
