= San Francisco River (Argentina) =

Coordinates: 23°18′15″S 64°4′45″W

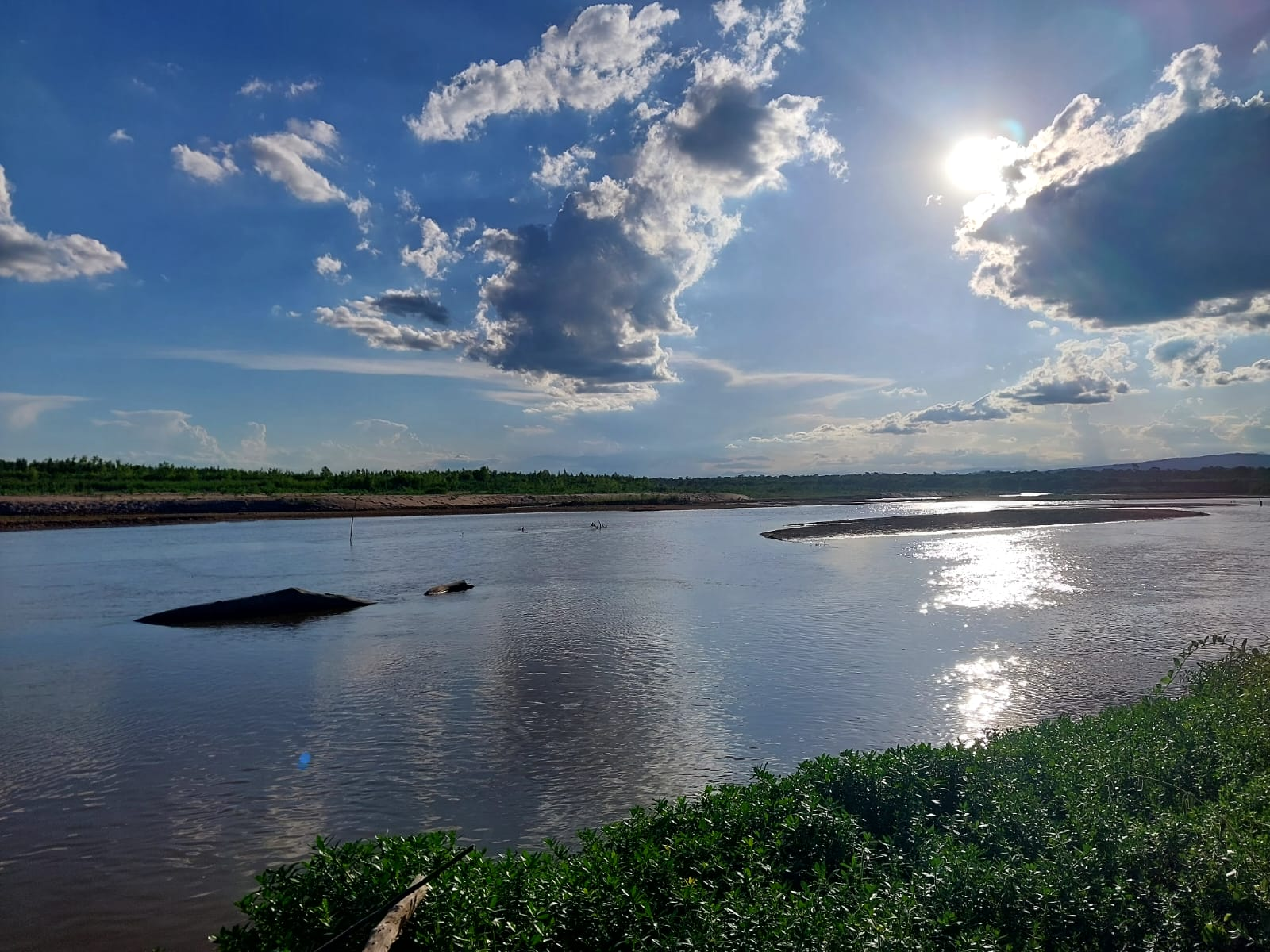

Location
- Country: Argentina

Physical characteristics
- Mouth
  - location: Bermejo River

The San Francisco River (Spanish, Río San Francisco) is a river of Argentina. It is a tributary of the Bermejo River.

== See also ==
- List of rivers of Argentina
