= Saladillo Stream =

River in Argentina

Coordinates: 32°59′54″S 60°36′42″W

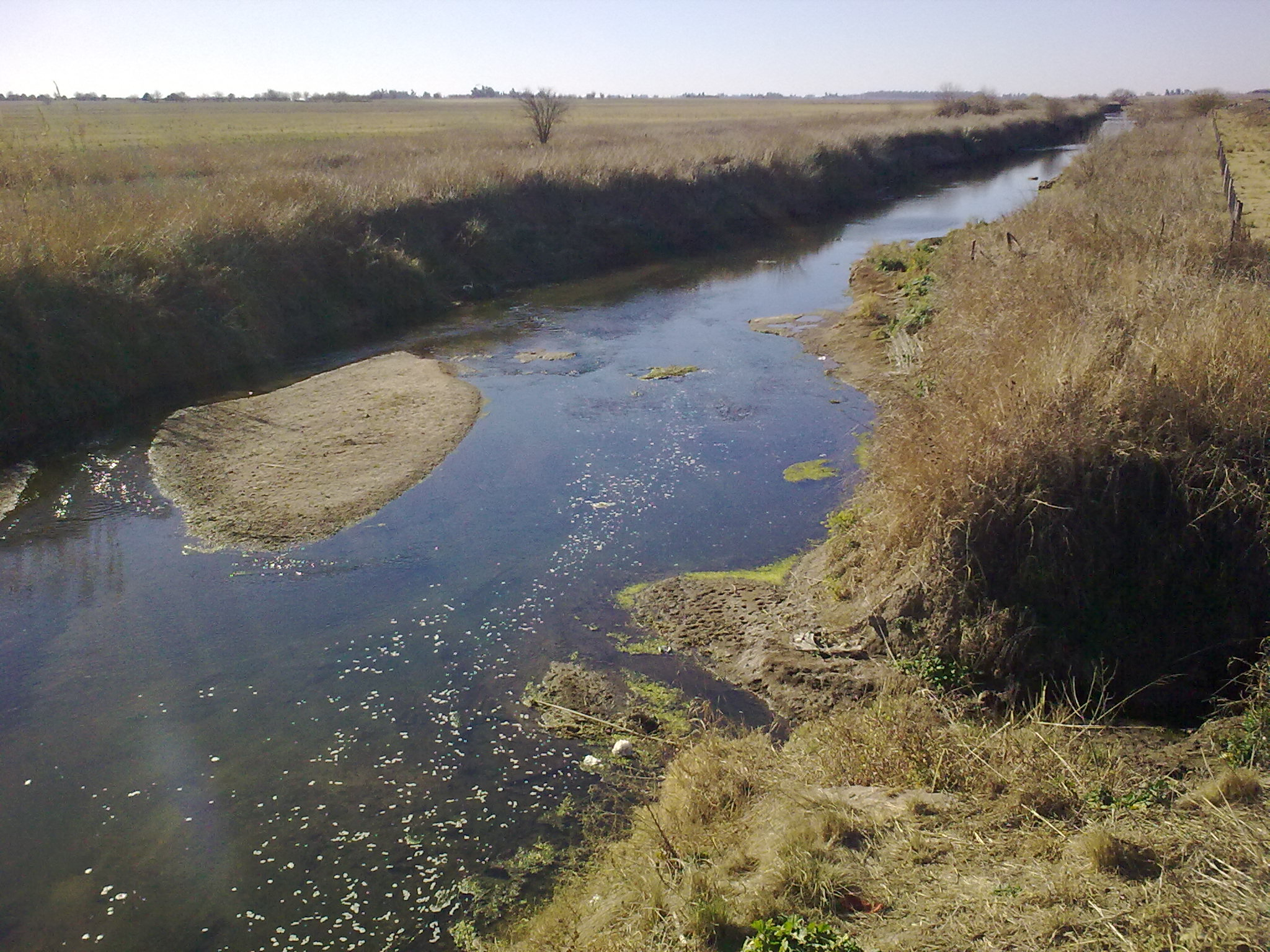
View of the saladillo River

The Saladillo Stream (Spanish, Arroyo Saladillo or Río Saladillo) is a small tributary of the Paraná River, that discharges into it between the cities of Rosario and Villa Gobernador Gálvez, in the province of Santa Fe, Argentina. It serves as the political border between these two towns of the Greater Rosario area, and is one of the two important affluents of the Paraná in the area, together with the Ludueña Stream in the north.

Although in Spanish the Saladillo is called an arroyo, it is not an arroyo in the English sense of a dry or intermittent stream. The Spanish word arroyo means "stream" or "brook", but the Saladillo is a sizable river with a drainage basin encompassing 3,205 square kilometres (1,237 sq mi). Río Saladillo is a variant name in Spanish. Its water services an important area in the southern part of Santa Fe province—both economically for agriculture, and demographically, since its last few kilometres flow through inside a densely populated area (Rosario has over a million residents). The port of Villa Gobernador Gálvez is located on the mouth of the Saladillo.

Most of the Saladillo is canalized, and parts are channelized, as are its main tributaries. It requires periodic dredging to support its massive use for agriculture, which in turn degrades the water quality with pollutants such as pesticides and fertilizers, and tends to fill the river with sediments produced by erosion. The Saladillo's riparian zone is subject to flooding. The lower course is an urban stream, and is polluted by industrial and domestic waste.

== See also ==
- List of rivers of Argentina
