= Malargüe River =

River in Argentina

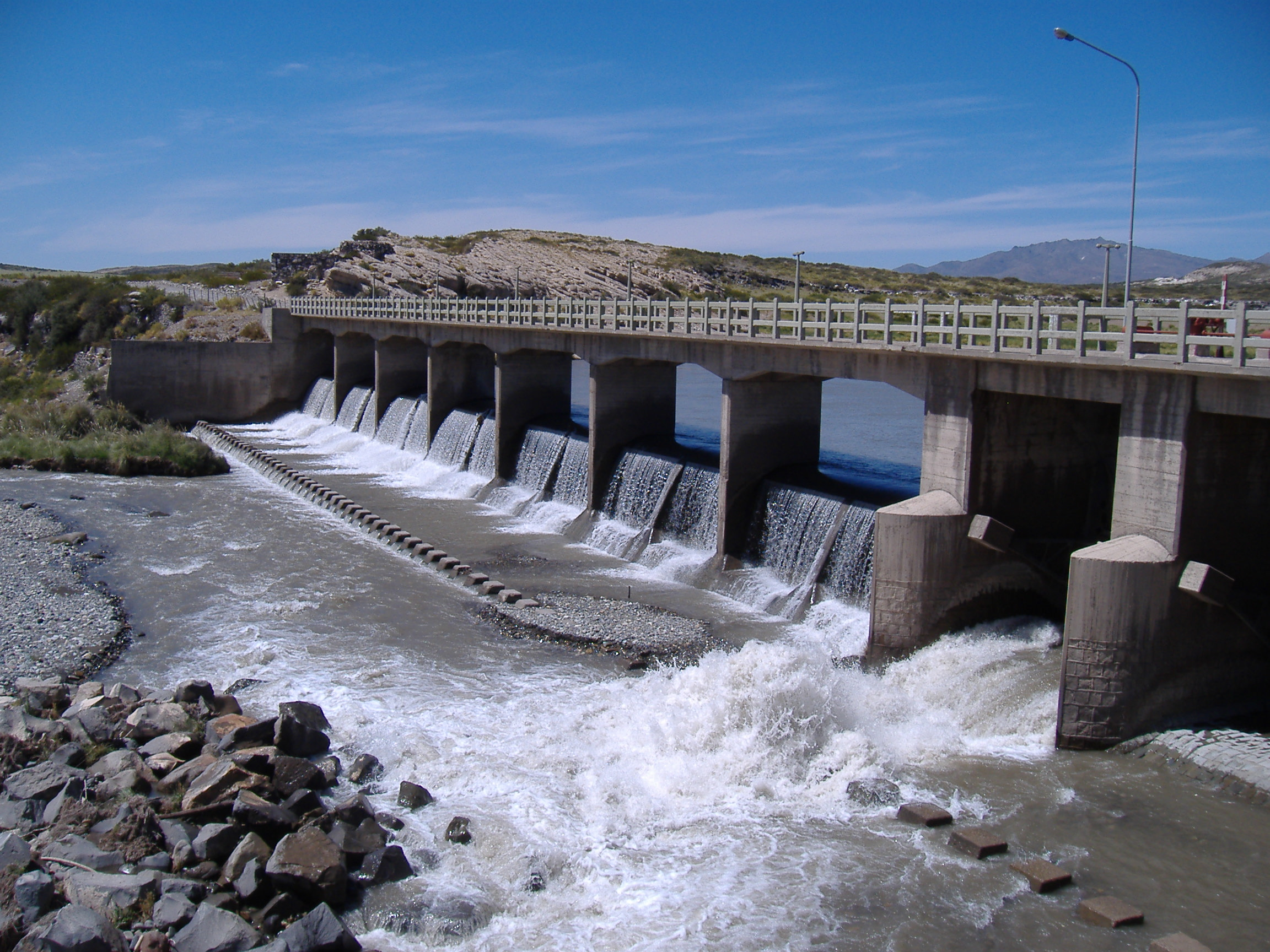
The Blas Brisoli Dam, near Malargüe City

The Malargüe River (in Spanish: Río Malargüe) is a river located in the southern zone of the Mendoza Province, in the west of Argentina. It originates in the Malargüe lake in the Andes range, at 2,500 m above mean sea level, flows into the Malargüe Department and ends in the Llancanelo Lake, being its main tributary.

The river is part of the Llancanelo basin, which has an area of 10,602 km² and is located at 35°30′S 70°00′W. Its flow increases in the summer (29.00 m³/s), when the ice begins to melt, and decreases in the winter (6.31 m³/s). Near the city of Malargüe, it is contained by the Blas Brisoli Dam, which derives water for irrigation. Trout can be found in this river and there is a trout hatchery co-located with the dam.
