= Tupungato River =

- Location of mouth

Location
- Country: Argentina
- Province: Mendoza Province

Physical characteristics
- Source
  - elevation: 4,251 m (13,947 ft)
- Mouth
  - coordinates: 33°S 70°W
- Basin size: 1,858 km^{2} (717 sq mi)

The Tupungato River (in Spanish: Río Tupungato) is a river located in the western zone of the Mendoza Province called Uco Valley (in Spanish: Valle de Uco), flows in Luján de Cuyo and Tupungato departments, to the west of Argentina. It arises on the Del Plomo and Del Juncal glaciers in the north of the Tupungato Mountain and ends at the Mendoza River. Its drainage basin has an area of 1,858 km^{2} and is located in 33°S 70°W. Its source elevation is of 4,251 AMSL.

The Tupungato is a dangerous river specially from November to March (around the summer), when the ice begins to melt and increases its force.

Tributaries: Plomo River and Blanco River I.
