= Horcones River =

River in Argentina

Coordinates: 26°35′S 63°58′W

Location
- Country: Argentina

Physical characteristics
- Mouth
  - location: Salado River

The Horcones River (Spanish, Río Horcones) is a river of Argentina. The Horcones is a tributary of the Salado River, which crosses several provinces of Argentina as it journeys 1,150 kilometres (710 mi) from its source in the Salta Province to end in the Paraná River, in the Santa Fe Province.

== See also ==
- List of rivers of Argentina
