= Napostá Grande Stream =

River in Argentina

Coordinates: 38.79183563201333°S 62.238242343742755°W

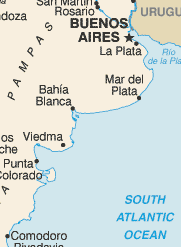
Arroyo Naposta reaches the Atlantic in the area of Estuary of Bahía Blanca

Napostá Grande Stream is located in the region of Bahía Blanca, Buenos Aires Province, Argentina

It is a stream whose watershed is in Sierra de la Ventana, about 120 kilometres (75 mi) northeast to Bahía Blanca. It was essential during the early history of the city of Bahía Blanca as a source of water and also as a natural defense against aborigine. Later on it was useful as a water supply for agriculture.

It drains to the Atlantic Ocean reaching the Estuary of Bahía Blanca. It forms meanders before and as it enters the city in the area of Club de Golf Palihue, then Parque de Mayo, where a weir has been built at a natural split, to avoid flooding after heavy rains in Ventana mountain range. If flow increases enough and the level of the stream surpasses the weir, water flows also to the alternative branch reaching the estuary through the Maldonado stream.

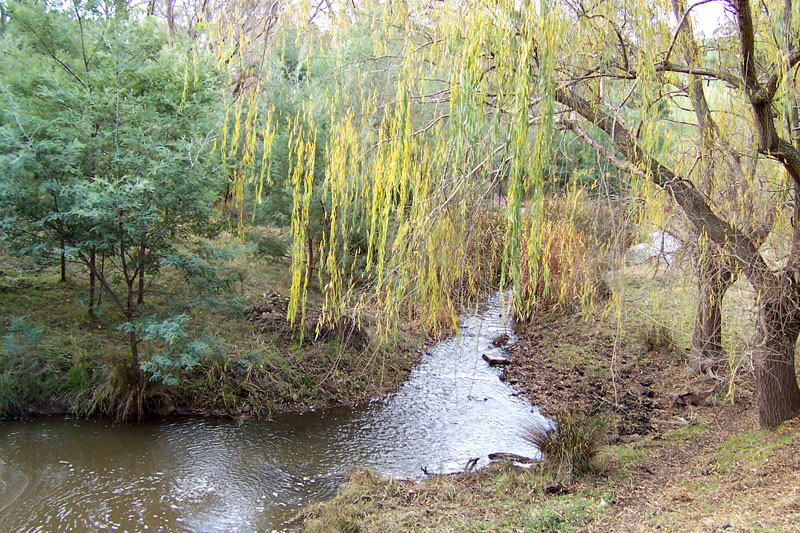

From there downstream it flows naturally through the city although it has been piped shortly thereafter to create a greenspace named Paseo de las Esculturas, and a very interesting urban area by which properties increased substantially their price since then. Napostá is heavily contaminated distally, even before reaching the city, probably due to techniques of fertilization carried out in the areas which form its watershed, especially close to the city
