= List of power stations in Argentina =

Location of power stations in Argentina
Nuclear, gas, coal, hydroelectric

The following power stations are located in Argentina.

== Thermal plants ==
| Station | Capacity (MW) | Fuel | Location | Coordinates | Refs |
|---|---|---|---|---|---|
| Costanera | 1,250 | Coal | Buenos Aires | | |
| Calchines | 40 | | Santa Fe | | |
| Güemes | 250 | | Salta | | |
| Necochea | 135 | | Buenos Aires | | |
| Piedrabuena | 620 | | Buenos Aires | | |
| San Nicolas | 650 | Coal | Buenos Aires | | |
| Sorrento | 216 | | Santa Fe | | |
| Arturo Zanichelli | 216 | | Cordoba | | |

== Gas turbines ==
| Station | Capacity (MW) | Location | Coordinates | Refs |
|---|---|---|---|---|
| Costanera | 859 | Buenos Aires | | |
| Dock Sud | 775 | Buenos Aires | | |
| Central Puerto | 760 | Buenos Aires | | |
| Genelba | 670 | | | |
| La Plata | 131 | | | |
| Manuel Belgrano | 830 | Campana | 34.184°S 59.007°W | |
| Pilar | | | | |
| San Nicolas CCGT | 845 | Rosario | | |
| Termoandes | 633 | Salta | | |
| Agual del Cajon | 703 | Neuquen | | |
| Central Bicentario | 496 | Cordoba | | |
| José de San Martín | 830 | Santa Fe | | |
| Loma de la Lata | 550 | Neuquen | | |

== Hydroelectric ==
Hydroelectric stations over 1 MW.

| Hydroelectric station | Coordinates | Capacity (MW) | Year completed | River | Notes |
|---|---|---|---|---|---|
| Yacyretá | 27°28′58″S 56°43′30″W | 3,100 | 1994 | Paraná River | Shared with Paraguay |
| Salto Grande | 31°16′29″S 57°56′18″W | 1,890 | 1979 | Uruguay River | Shared with Uruguay |
| Piedra del Águila | 40°11′25″S 69°59′29″W | 1,400 | 1992 | Limay River | |
| El Chocón | 39°15′57″S 68°45′23″W | 1,260 | 1973 | Limay River | |
| Condor Cliff | | 1,140 | Under construction | Santa Cruz River | |
| Alicurá | 40°35′10″S 70°45′09″W | 1,050 | 1985 | Limay River | |
| Río Grande | 32°13′27.5″S 64°37′56″W | 750 | 1986 | Tercero River | Pumped-storage power plant |
| La Barrancosa | | 600 | Under construction | Santa Cruz River | |
| Futaleufú | 43°07′37.6″S 71°38′12.7″W | 472 | 1978 | Futaleufú River | |
| Planicie Banderita (Cerros Colorados) | 38°33′37.1″S 68°28′28.3″W | 472 | 1978 | Neuquén River | |
| Pichi Picún Leufú | 40°00′41.1″S 69°59′24.9″W | 285 | 2000 | Limay River | |
| Los Reyunos | 34°36′07.8″S 68°38′24.2″W | 224 | 1983 | Diamante River | Pumped-storage power plant |
| Agua del Toro | 34°35′04.7″S 69°02′10.2″W | 150 | 1982 | Diamante River | |
| Arroyito | 39°06′25.2″S 68°35′07.8″W | 127.8 | 1979 | Limay River | |
| Los Caracoles | 31°31′01.3″S 68°58′04.5″W | 121.4 | 2009 | San Juan River | |
| Cacheuta (Potrerillos) | 33°01′38.8″S 69°06′45.3″W | 120 | 2003 | Mendoza River | |
| Urugua-í | 25°52′33.7″S 54°33′45.6″W | 120 | 1991 | Urugua-í River | |
| Nihuil II (Aisol) | 34°54′44.5″S 68°37′24.9″W | 110 | 1968 | Atuel River | |
| Manuel Belgrano (Cabra Corral) | 25°16′11.6″S 65°19′48.1″W | 100.5 | 1973 | Salado River | |
| Nihuil I (El Nihuil) | 34°59′41.3″S 68°37′50″W | 72 | 1947 | Atuel River | |
| El Tambolar | | 75 | Under construction | San Juan River | |
| Punta Negra | 31°30′59.7″S 68°48′53.2″W | 62 | 2015 | San Juan River | |
| Álvarez Condarco (Potrerillos) | 33°02′39.8″S 69°03′04.5″W | 61 | 2003 | Mendoza River | |
| Casa de Piedra | 38°12′52.5″S 67°11′26.9″W | 60 | 1996 | Colorado River | |
| Los Molinos I | 31°50′16.9″S 64°26′43.5″W | 52 | 1953 | Segundo River | |
| Florentino Ameghino | 43°41′57.7″S 66°28′56.2″W | 46.8 | 1963 | Chubut River | |
| Quebrada de Ullum | 31°28′27.1″S 68°38′52″W | 45 | 1980 | San Juan River | |
| Nihuil III (Tierras Blancas) | 34°52′56.7″S 68°34′30.8″W | 42 | 1971 | Atuel River | |
| Ullum | 31°27′20.1″S 68°45′21.9″W | 42 | | San Juan River | |
| Benjamín Reolín | 32°11′27.7″S 64°19′23.2″W | 33 | | Tercero River | |
| Las Maderas | 24°26′37″S 65°13′07.8″W | 30.6 | | Perico River | |
| Batiruana (Escaba) | 27°38′13.7″S 65°44′51.8″W | 24 | 1948 | Marapa River | |
| San Roque | 31°21′11.9″S 64°23′37.5″W | 24 | 1944 | Primero River | |
| Nihuil IV (Valle Grande) | 34°50′00″S 68°30′52.1″W | 18 | 1965 | Atuel River | |
| El Carrizal | 33°17′57.1″S 68°43′11.8″W | 17 | 1971 | Tunuyán River | |
| Ingeniero Cassafousth | 32°10′30.7″S 64°22′27.1″W | 16.2 | 1954 | Tercero River | |
| La Viña | 31°52′15.3″S 65°02′07.5″W | 16 | 1959 | Río de los Sauces River | |
| Pueblo Viejo | | 15 | 1968 | Pueblo Viejo River | |
| Río Hondo | 27°31′21.7″S 64°53′10.7″W | 15 | 1967 | Dulce River | |
| El Tigre | 34°36′31.4″S 68°36′48.5″W | 14 | 1983 | Diamante River | |
| Celestino Gelsi (El Cadillal) | 26°37′11.6″S 65°11′12.2″W | 12.6 | 1966 | Salí River | |
| Cuesta del Viento | 30°11′45.9″S 69°03′45.3″W | 10.55 | 1997 | Jáchal River | |
| Martín Miguel de Güemes (El Tunal) | 25°13′39.2″S 64°28′35.6″W | 10.52 | 1972 | Salado River | |
| Fitz Simon (Embalse) | 32°10′43″S 64°25′16″W | 10.5 | 1955 | Tercero River | |
| Los Divisaderos | 37°52′18.4″S 67°41′22.5″W | 10 | 1980 | Colorado River | Hydroelectric plant on irrigation canal |
| Salto Andersen | 38°49′17″S 64°49′01.8″W | 7.86 | 2011 | Colorado River | |
| Río Reyes | 24°10′10.2″S 65°29′30.2″W | 7 | | Reyes River | |
| Los Coroneles | 34°36′00.3″S 68°31′41.6″W | 6.64 | 1970 | Diamante River | Hydroelectric plant on irrigation canal |
| General San Martín | 33°02′41.4″S 68°55′19″W | 6.48 | 1950 | Mendoza River | Hydroelectric plant on irrigation canal |
| Piedras Moras | 32°10′03.5″S 64°14′37.5″W | 6.3 | 1979 | Tercero River | |
| Julián Romero | 38°50′11.9″S 68°02′15.4″W | 6.2 | | Neuquén River | Hydroelectric plant on irrigation canal |
| César Cipolletti | 38°54′47.3″S 67°56′31.2″W | 5.4 | 1956 | Neuquén River | Hydroelectric plant on irrigation canal |
| Guillermo Céspedes | 39°33′35.8″S 65°40′55″W | 5.2 | 1963 | Negro River | Hydroelectric plant on irrigation canal |
| Los Molinos II | 31°50′35.5″S 64°24′53.8″W | 4.5 | 1954 | Segundo River | |
| La Calera | 31°21′08.6″S 64°20′00.2″W | 4 | 1911 | Primero River | |
| La Florida | 33°06′48.3″S 66°00′09.4″W | 2.4 | 1953 | Quinto River | |
| Loma Atravesada | 41°49′05.2″S 71°31′57.8″W | 2 | | Azul River | |
| Los Quiroga | 27°41′30.4″S 64°18′30″W | 2 | 1963 | Dulce River | Hydroelectric plant on irrigation canal |
| La Lujanita | 33°02′19.6″S 68°54′19.5″W | 1.7 | | Mendoza River | Hydroelectric plant on irrigation canal |
| General Roca | 39°01′24.3″S 67°34′10″W | 1.2 | | Negro River | Hydroelectric plant on irrigation canal |
| Saladillo | 33°10′41.5″S 65°54′23.5″W | 1.2 | 2011 | Quinto River | |
| Salto de la Loma | 30°13′15.4″S 68°46′16.8″W | 1.2 | | Jáchal River | Hydroelectric plant on irrigation canal |
| Cruz del Eje | 30°45′54.9″S 64°45′17.6″W | 1.1 | 1943 | Cruz del Eje River | |
| Luján de Cuyo | 33°03′09.1″S 68°58′54.3″W | 1 | 2013 | Mendoza River | Hydroelectric plant on irrigation canal |

== Nuclear ==
| Reactor | Coordinates | Net capacity (MW) | Gross capacity (MW) | Commercial operation date |
|---|---|---|---|---|
| Atucha I | 33°58′00.2″S 59°12′26.7″W | 335 | 362 | 24 Jun, 1974 |
| Atucha II | 33°58′01.7″S 59°12′17.5″W | 692 | 745 | 27 Jun, 2014 |
| Embalse | 32°13′53.5″S 64°26′37.2″W | 600 | 648 | 20 Jan, 1984 |

== Wind ==
4.4 GW in 84 wind farms.

| Wind farm | Coordinates | Wind turbines | Capacity (MW) | Year completed | Notes |
|---|---|---|---|---|---|
| Loma Blanca IV | 43°06′35.1″S 65°15′11.9″W | 17 x 3 MW | 51 | 2013 Aug | |
| Malaspina I | 44°58′28.5″S 67°03′42.9″W | 25 x 2 MW | 50 | Under construction | |
| Arauco I-II | 28°42′06.5″S 66°45′06.8″W | 12 x 2.1 MW | 25.2 | 2011 May | |
| Arauco III | 28°42′06.5″S 66°45′06.8″W | 12 x 2.1 MW | 25.2 | 2013 Oct | |
| Arauco IV | 28°42′S 66°45′W | | 200 | | |
| Bicentenario | | 35 x 4 MW | 126 | | |
| Bonaerenses I | | 30 x 3 MW | 102 | | |
| Cañadon Leon | | 29 x 4 MW | 121 | | |
| Corti | | 29 x 3 MW | 100 | | |
| El Mataco & San Jorge | | 51 x 4 MW | 202 | | |
| Fray Güen | | 24 x 4 MW | 100 | | |
| La Buena Ventura | | 24 x 4 MW | 100 | | |
| La Elbita | | 25 x 5 MW | 130 | | |
| | | 32 x 4 MW | 121 | | |
| Los Teros | BA | 45 x 4 MW | 174 | 2020 | |
| Madryn | Puerto Madryn | | 222 | | |
| Rawson I | 43°21′00.8″S 65°10′36.2″W | 27 x 1.8 MW | 48.6 | 2011 Sep | |
| Rawson II | 43°21′00.8″S 65°10′36.2″W | 16 x 1.8 MW | 28.8 | 2012 Jan | |
| El Jume | 29°25′07.6″S 63°42′42.4″W | 4 x 2.1 MW | 8.4 | 2015 Oct | |
| Diadema | 45°44′48.5″S 67°41′36.8″W | 7 x 0.9 MW | 6.3 | 2011 Sep | |
| El Tordillo | 45°51′01.6″S 67°54′28.2″W | 2 x 1.5 MW | 3 | 2013 Sep | |
| Veladero | 29°21′05.8″S 69°56′21.4″W | 1 x 2 MW | 2 | 2008 Aug | |
| Tandil | 37°24′10.2″S 59°01′23″W | 2 x 0.4 MW | 0.8 | 1995 May | |
| Darregueira | 37°40′41.3″S 63°11′52.5″W | 1 x 0.75 MW | 0.75 | 1997 Sep | |
| Necochea | 38°36′15.9″S 58°47′25.9″W | 1 x 0.25 MW | 0.25 | 2010 Nov | |
| Cutral Có | 38°58′41″S 69°13′51.7″W | 1 x 0.4 MW | 0.4 | 1994 Oct | |

Former wind farms

| Wind farm | Coordinates | Aerogenerators | Capacity (MW) | Years operating | Notes |
|---|---|---|---|---|---|
| Antonio Morán | 45°50′52.8″S 67°36′07.2″W; 45°51′04.7″S 67°29′45.6″W; 45°49′55.9″S 67°31′32.9″W; 45°49′14.2″S 67°28′04.3″W | 16 x 0.66 MW; 8 x 0.75 MW; 2 x 0.25 MW | 17 | 1994 Jan-2001 Dec | |
| Jorge Romanutti | 46°48′31.7″S 67°58′57.1″W | 4 x 0.6 MW | 2.4 | 2001 Mar-2005 May | |
| General Acha | 37°25′51.6″S 64°42′56.7″W | 2 x 0.9 MW | 1.8 | 2002 Dec-2004 Feb | |
| Punta Alta | 38°46′59.9″S 61°53′54.5″W; 38°53′49.7″S 61°36′34.8″W | 3 x 0.6 MW; 1 x 0.4 MW | 2.2 | 1995 Feb-1998 Dec | Out of service |
| Mayor Buratovich | 39°13′44.9″S 62°38′58.6″W | 2 x 0.6 MW | 1.2 | 1997 Oct | Out of service |
| Claromecó | 38°49′45.6″S 60°05′09.8″W | 1 x 0.75 MW | 0.75 | 1998 Dec | Out of service |
| Rada Tilly | 45°55′00.6″S 67°34′46″W | 1 x 0.4 MW | 0.4 | 1996 Mar | Out of service |

== Solar ==
2 GW.

| Solar plant | Coordinates | Capacity (MW) | Year completed |
|---|---|---|---|
| Cauchari | Jujuy | 300 | 2020 |
| Altiplano | | 208 | 2021. 4km altitude |
| San Rafael | Mendoza | 180 | 2025 |
| Cafayate | Salta | 100 | |
| La Puna | Salta | 107 | 2021 |
| Cañada Honda II | 31°59′15.6″S 68°32′23.4″W | 3 | 2012 |
| Cañada Honda I | 31°59′15.6″S 68°32′23.4″W | 2 | 2012 |
| Chimbera | 31°59′15.6″S 68°32′23.4″W | 2 | 2013 |
| San Juan | 31°23′19.9″S 68°40′30.8″W | 1.2 | 2011 |
| Santa Fe | 32°43′33.2″S 60°45′49.7″W | 1.1 | Under construction |
| Terrazas del Portezuelo | 33°18′07.8″S 66°17′11.6″W | 1.02 | 2014 |
| Camino Parque del Buen Ayre | 34°31′29″S 58°35′33.2″W | 0.5 | 2015 |
| Cauchari Solar Plant | 24.0950°S 66.7237°W | 300 | 2020 |

== Biomass ==
| Plant | Coordinates | Capacity (MW) | Year completed |
|---|---|---|---|
| La Florida | 26°48′59″S 65°05′02.8″W | 62 | 2012 |
| Alto Paraná-Puerto Esperanza | 25°59′19.4″S 54°38′05.1″W | 40 | |
| Tabacal | 23°15′12.9″S 64°14′27.4″W | 40 | 2013 |
| Alto Paraná-Puerto Piray | 26°28′38.4″S 54°43′02.7″W | 40 | |
| La Providencia | 27°15′52.8″S 65°34′02.6″W | 38 | 2009 |
| Santa Bárbara | 27°27′32.5″S 65°36′22.4″W | 16 | 2010 |
| Papel Misionero | 26°56′09.6″S 55°07′18.7″W | 15 | |
| General Deheza | 32°45′10.2″S 63°47′29.4″W | 10.95 | 2008 |

== Biogas ==
| Plant | Coordinates | Capacity (MW) | Year completed |
|---|---|---|---|
| San Miguel Norte III-C | 34°31′32.9″S 58°37′14.6″W | 10 | 2012 Oct |
| San Martín Norte III-A | 34°32′14.5″S 58°36′11.1″W | 7.1 | 2012 May |

== See also ==
- Electricity sector in Argentina
- List of power stations in South America
- List of largest power stations in the world
