= Potrerillos =

Potrerillos may refer to:

- Potrerillos, Chile, a former mining camp in Atacama Region, Chile
  - Fundición Potrerillos, copper smelter in Chile
- Potrerillos (caldera), Atacama Region, Chile
- Potrerillos, Cortés, a municipality in Honduras
- Potrerillos, El Paraíso, a municipality in Honduras
- Potrerillos, Mendoza, a touristic area in Mendoza Province, Argentina
- Boca de Potrerillos, a pre-Columbian archaeological site in the northern Mexican state of Nuevo León, known for its petroglyphs
- Potrerillos Dam, on the Mendoza River, Argentina
- Potrerillos, Chiriquí, Panama
