= Puente del Inca =

Natural arch in Mendoza Province, Argentina

Coordinates: 32°49′36″S 69°54′40″W

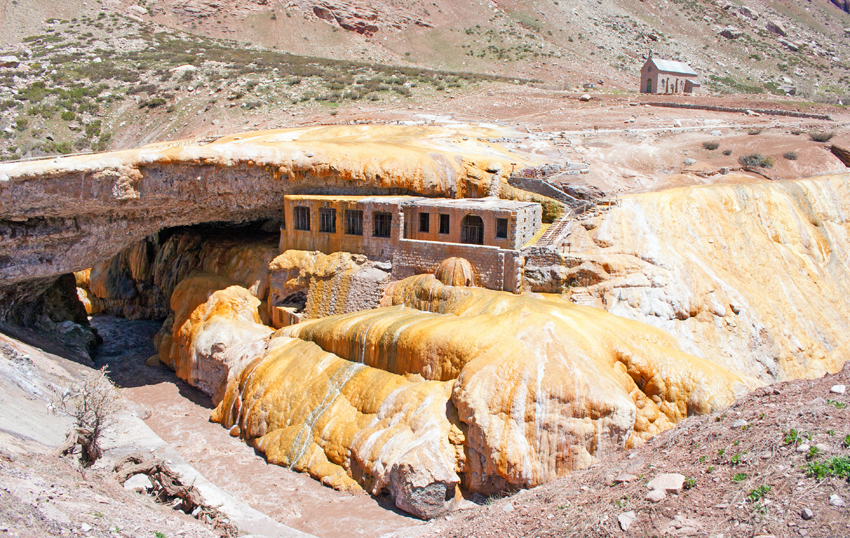
Puente del Inca arch and abandoned spa hotel

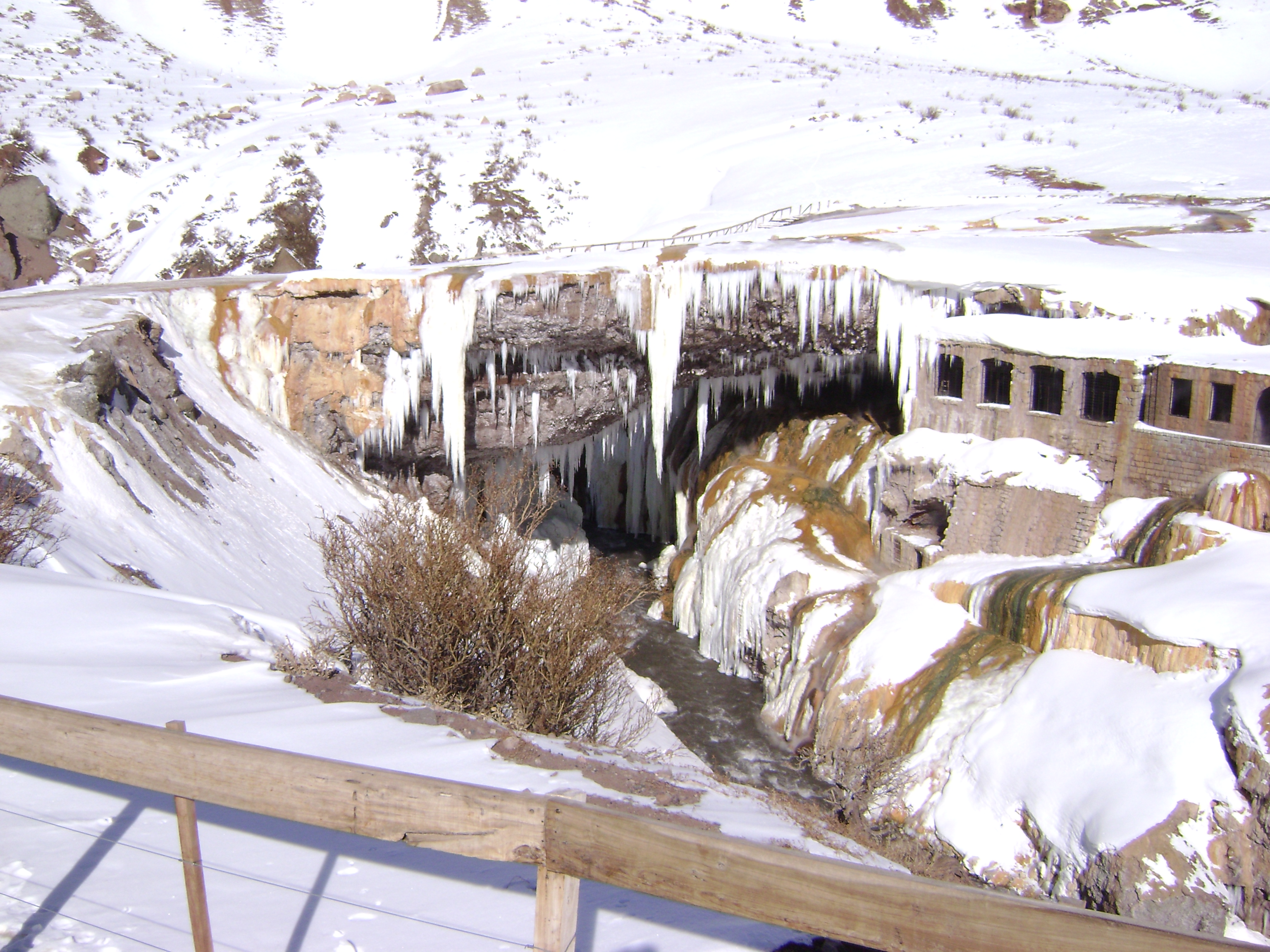
Puente del Inca in July

Puente del Inca (English "Bridge of the Inca") is a natural arch that forms a bridge over the Las Cuevas River, a tributary of the Mendoza River. It is located near the small village of Puente del Inca, in Las Heras Department, Mendoza Province, Argentina. The nearby hot springs are also named Puente del Inca.

While Puente del Inca has shown signs of deterioration, it remains stable under its weight under present conditions. Factors of safety ranging from 1.5 to 3.0 have been estimated for the arch.

== Formation ==
Both glaciers and the hot springs were involved in the formation of the arch. During an ice age, glaciers would have expanded down throughout the entire valley; then, at the end of the ice age when the Earth began to warm up again, the retreating ice would have left behind massive piles of eroded debris. The water that flows from the hot springs is extremely rich in mineral content, to the point that it has been known to petrify small objects in a layer of minerals. Similarly, the piles of debris left by the glaciers were encrusted over time into a single solid mass. Finally, during a period where the climate was extremely wet, a powerful river formed in the valley. It cut a channel through the lower, least encrusted layers of debris, which gradually eroded into the large opening of the arch.

== History ==
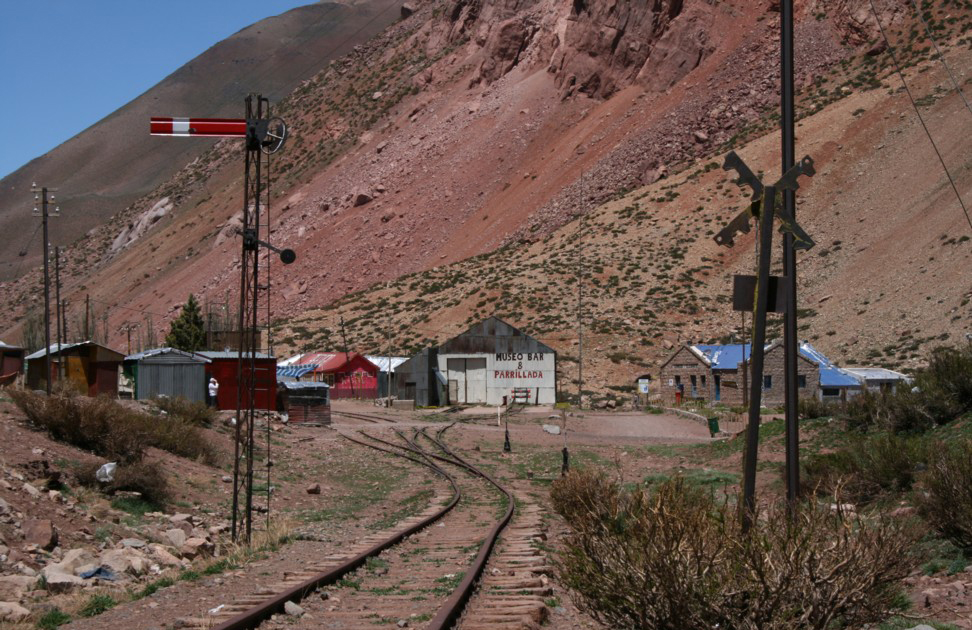
Puente del Inca station

In March 1835, Charles Darwin visited the site, and made some drawings of the bridge with large stalactites.

In the early 20th century, a large thermal resort and monastery used the hot springs to treat certain illnesses. There is still a spa further down the river at Cacheuta. Tourists arrived by train at the resort, at a railway station that is still standing, though long abandoned. This was one of the last Argentine stations of the Transandine Railway before the train continued into Chile through a long tunnel under the Andes.

The area is located between the two trail-heads for climbing Aconcagua, the highest mountain in the western hemisphere. The abandoned railway station has been turned into a mountaineering museum, "Museo del Andinista", founded by a group of mountain climbers from Rosario to display the cultural history of the area. The museum is open to the public during the summer and is run by the founding group of friends.

== Geography and climate ==
Situated at 2,744 m (9,003 ft) above sea level, Puente del Inca has a warm-summer mediterranean continental climate (Dsb, according to the Köppen climate classification), as at least 4 months see an average temperature above 10 °C (50 °F) and at least one month sees an average temperature below 0 °C (32 °F), having dry, moderate summers and snowy winters. This (continental) type of climate is extremely rare in both South America and the Southern Hemisphere at large, due to the scarcity of large landmasses in the extratropical southern latitudes. Puente del Inca achieves it due to its relatively large distance from its nearest ocean—146 kilometres (91 mi); close enough to bring moisture to avoid having a cold semi-arid climate like the nearby Arid Diagonal but distant enough to increase the seasonal temperature variation—its leeward position in the Andes, and its high elevation reducing temperatures to well below that of the surrounding area. Nevertheless, its vegetation (notably lacking the typical hemiboreal or subalpine forests) is far more consistent with a cold semi-arid climate (BSk, according to Köppen).

Climate data for Puente del Inca, Elevation: 2720 m (1941–1970)
Month	Jan	Feb	Mar	Apr	May	Jun	Jul	Aug	Sep	Oct	Nov	Dec	Year
Record high °C (°F)	30.0 (86.0)	28.0 (82.4)	25.0 (77.0)	23.5 (74.3)	21.0 (69.8)	21.0 (69.8)	18.5 (65.3)	17.5 (63.5)	21.0 (69.8)	24.0 (75.2)	25.5 (77.9)	26.0 (78.8)	30.0 (86.0)
Mean daily maximum °C (°F)	20.7 (69.3)	19.8 (67.6)	18.0 (64.4)	15.0 (59.0)	10.2 (50.4)	5.7 (42.3)	4.9 (40.8)	6.1 (43.0)	9.1 (48.4)	11.5 (52.7)	15.4 (59.7)	18.5 (65.3)	12.9 (55.2)
Daily mean °C (°F)	14.3 (57.7)	13.0 (55.4)	10.9 (51.6)	8.0 (46.4)	4.6 (40.3)	0.8 (33.4)	−0.7 (30.7)	0.6 (33.1)	3.0 (37.4)	5.7 (42.3)	9.7 (49.5)	12.7 (54.9)	6.9 (44.4)
Mean daily minimum °C (°F)	6.8 (44.2)	5.8 (42.4)	3.3 (37.9)	1.2 (34.2)	−0.9 (30.4)	−3.8 (25.2)	−6.0 (21.2)	−4.7 (23.5)	−2.9 (26.8)	−0.7 (30.7)	2.6 (36.7)	4.8 (40.6)	0.5 (32.9)
Record low °C (°F)	−2.0 (28.4)	−4.5 (23.9)	−4.8 (23.4)	−7.0 (19.4)	−13.8 (7.2)	−19.1 (−2.4)	−18.1 (−0.6)	−15.7 (3.7)	−14.6 (5.7)	−11.3 (11.7)	−10.3 (13.5)	−4.5 (23.9)	−19.1 (−2.4)
Average precipitation mm (inches)	4.6 (0.18)	4.5 (0.18)	3.5 (0.14)	9.7 (0.38)	64.0 (2.52)	81.3 (3.20)	50.4 (1.98)	42.9 (1.69)	18.4 (0.72)	19.7 (0.78)	8.6 (0.34)	1.1 (0.04)	308.7 (12.15)
Average precipitation days	2	2	1	2	7	9	7	6	4	4	2	2	48
Average snowy days	0.4	0	0.4	1	3	7	6	5	4	3	2	0.7	32.5
Average relative humidity (%)	26	26	25	27	37	50	45	45	41	34	26	24	34
Mean monthly sunshine hours	310.0	296.6	279.0	252.0	186.0	144.0	148.8	192.2	222.0	254.2	279.0	294.5	2,858.3
Percentage possible sunshine	71	79	73	75	57	48	46	57	62	63	67	67	64
Source: Servicio Meteorologico Nacional, Secretaria de Mineria, UNLP (sun, extremes and snow only)

== Gallery ==
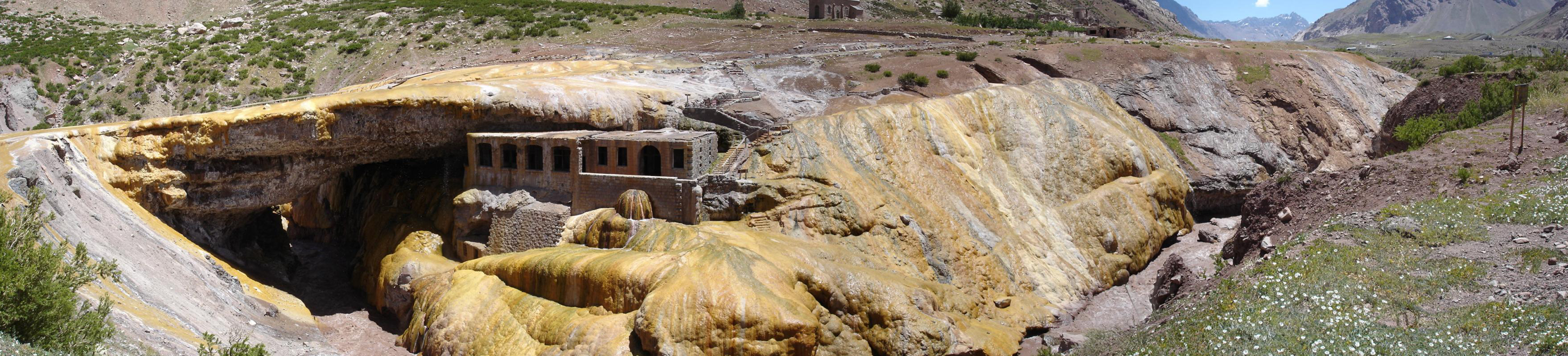
Puente del Inca panorama

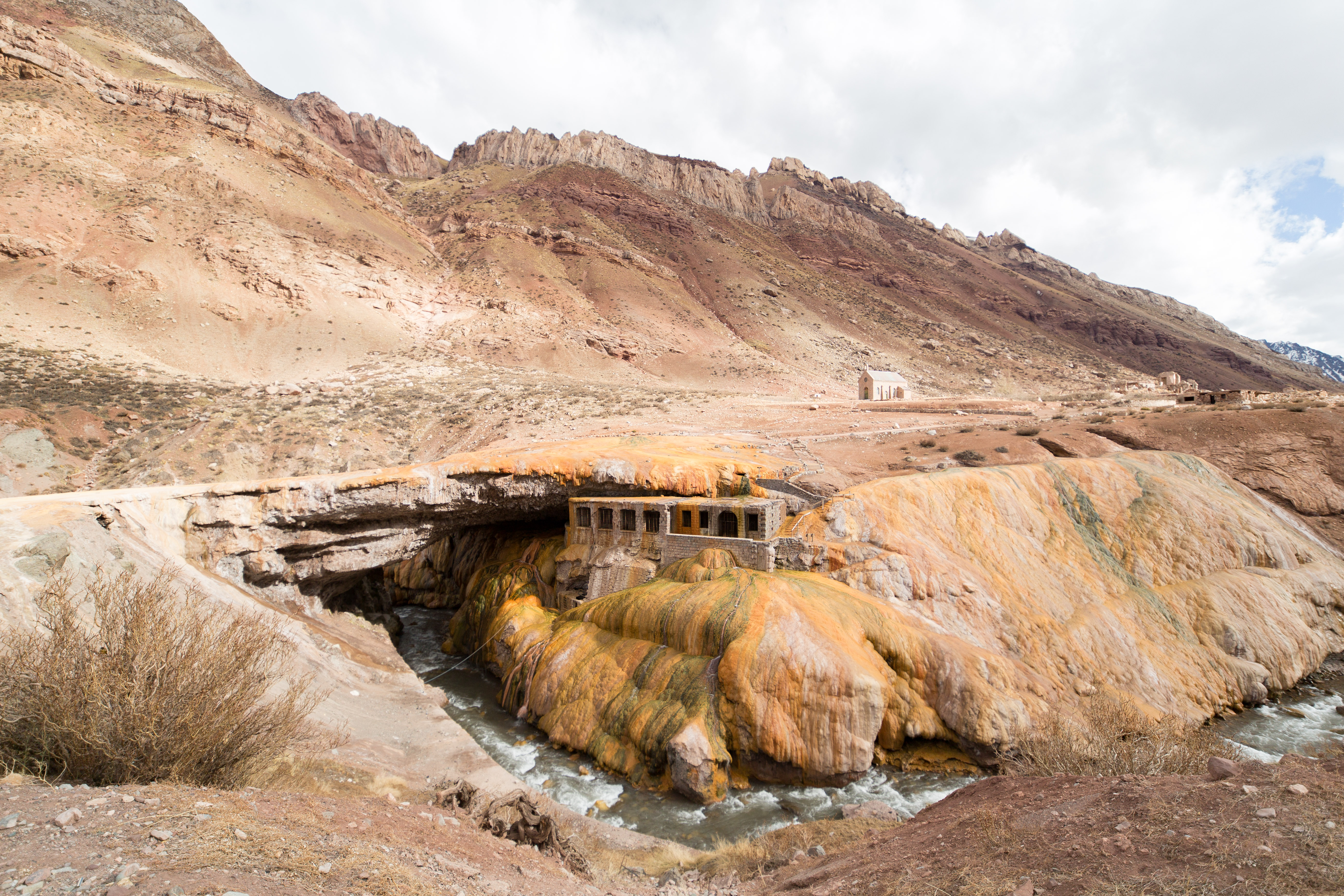
Puente del Inca seen from west
