= Marull =

Marull is a surname. Notable people with the surname include:

- José Presas y Marull (?-1842) Catalonia attorney, writer, politician, diplomat and historian
- Laia Marull (born 1973), Spanish actress
- Narciso Marull (1747-c.1820), Spanish apothecary and merchant
