= Miramar, Córdoba =

Coordinates: 30°54′54″S 62°40′31″W

Miramar
- Town
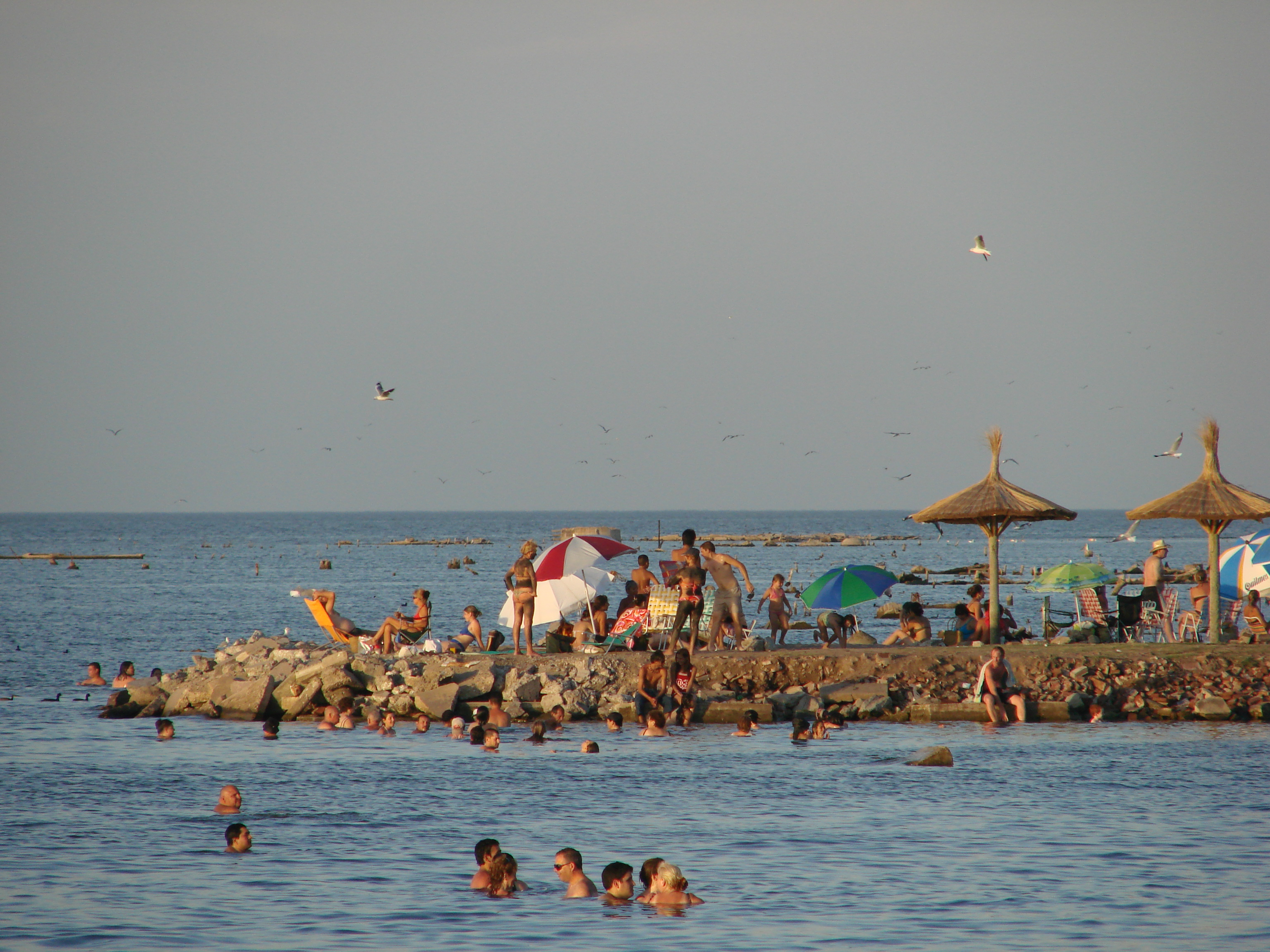
- Interactive map of Miramar
- Country: Argentina
- Province: Córdoba
- Department: San Justo

Government
  - Intendant: Gerardo Cicarelli (Union for Córdoba)

Population
  - Total: 1,979
- Demonym: miramareño/a
- Time zone: UTC−3 (ART)
- CPA base: T5143

Miramar is a town in San Justo Department, located in Córdoba Province (Argentina).

== Overview ==
Established on November 18, 1924, with the inauguration by Victorio Rosso of the Hotel Miramar, a health resort, Miramar was the site of a number of mineral spas from its early days, and in 1933, a jitney service was started between the town and the provincial capital, Córdoba. The relocation to Miramar of Máximo Palkhe, a businessman from Avellaneda (a suburb of Buenos Aires), in 1936, was followed by his decision to have a luxury hotel built on the shores of Mar Chiquita, a saline lake, in 1940. The decision led to the development of other tourist facilities in the hamlet, and Palkhe's Gran Hotel Vienna (named for his wife's birthplace), was inaugurated in 1945. The Palkhes sold the hotel in 1946, and relocated to Germany, however, and the establishment, which closed in 1980, has been at the center of a number of mysteries and controversies in the decades since.

The town became a significant center of tourism in Argentina from the 1950s to the 1970s, and Miramar, home to 110 hotels in its heyday, grew to around 4,500 inhabitants by the 1970 Census. During that latter decade, however, inflows from the Dulce, Primero, and Segundo Rivers into Mar Chiquita increased significantly as a result of the Florentino Ameghino water cycle (which prognosticated higher rainfall after 1970), and longstanding deforestation in the Gran Chaco region (north of the area). Record floods in 1977 and 1986 devastated Miramar, and the town was relocated 5 km (3 mi) to the south, to higher ground, in 1992, when most of the flooded ruins were demolished.

Amid a significant recovery in the Argentine economy after 2004, tourism in Miramar began to recover. The town, in 2009, was home to 1,527 hotel rooms, and was named Top Natural Wonder of Córdoba Province by a reader survey conducted by La Voz del Interior. Site of a wildlife refuge since 1966, Miramar is also home to the Loma de los Indios Birdwatching Station, and the Miramar Biological Station.

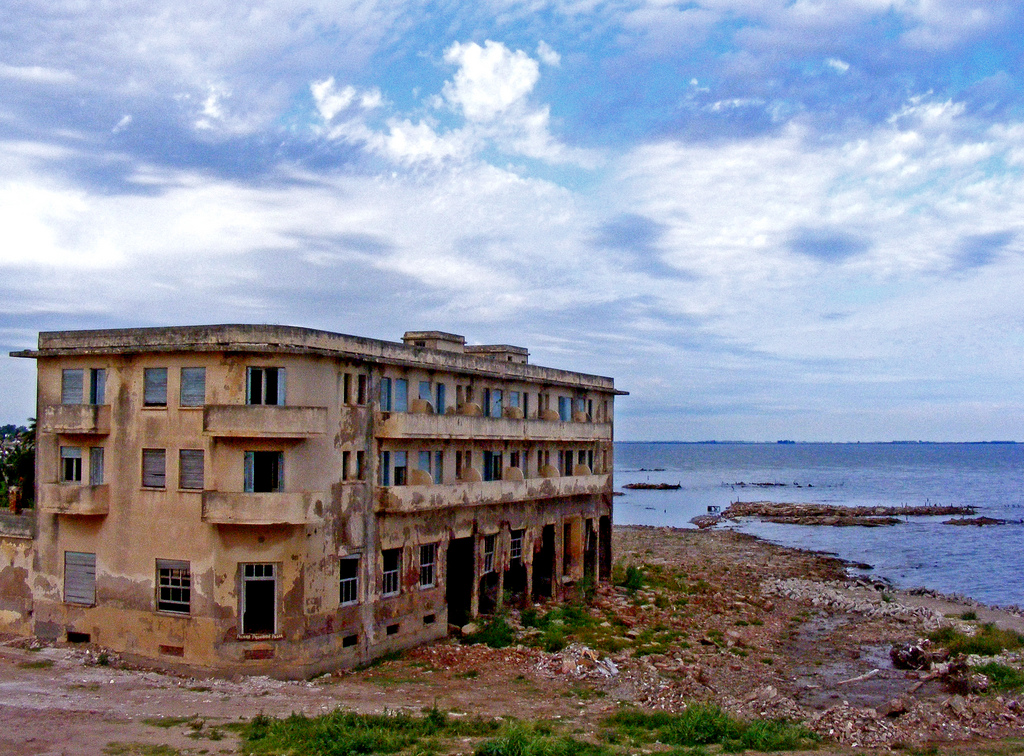
Ruins of the Gran Hotel Vienna

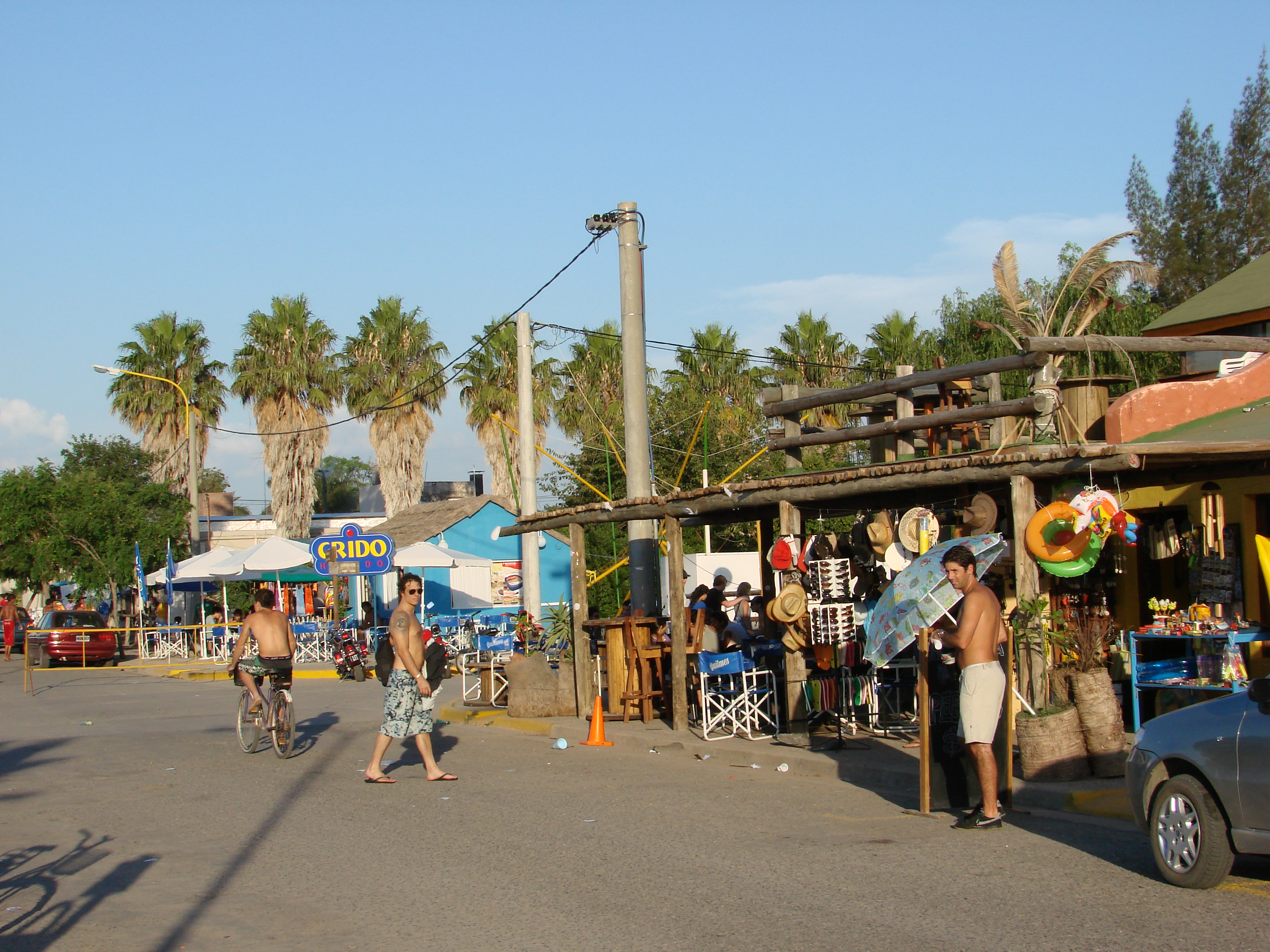
Tourists in Miramar
