= Río Tercero =

Río Tercero may refer to:

- Tercero River
- Río Tercero, Córdoba
