= Segundo River =

River in Argentina

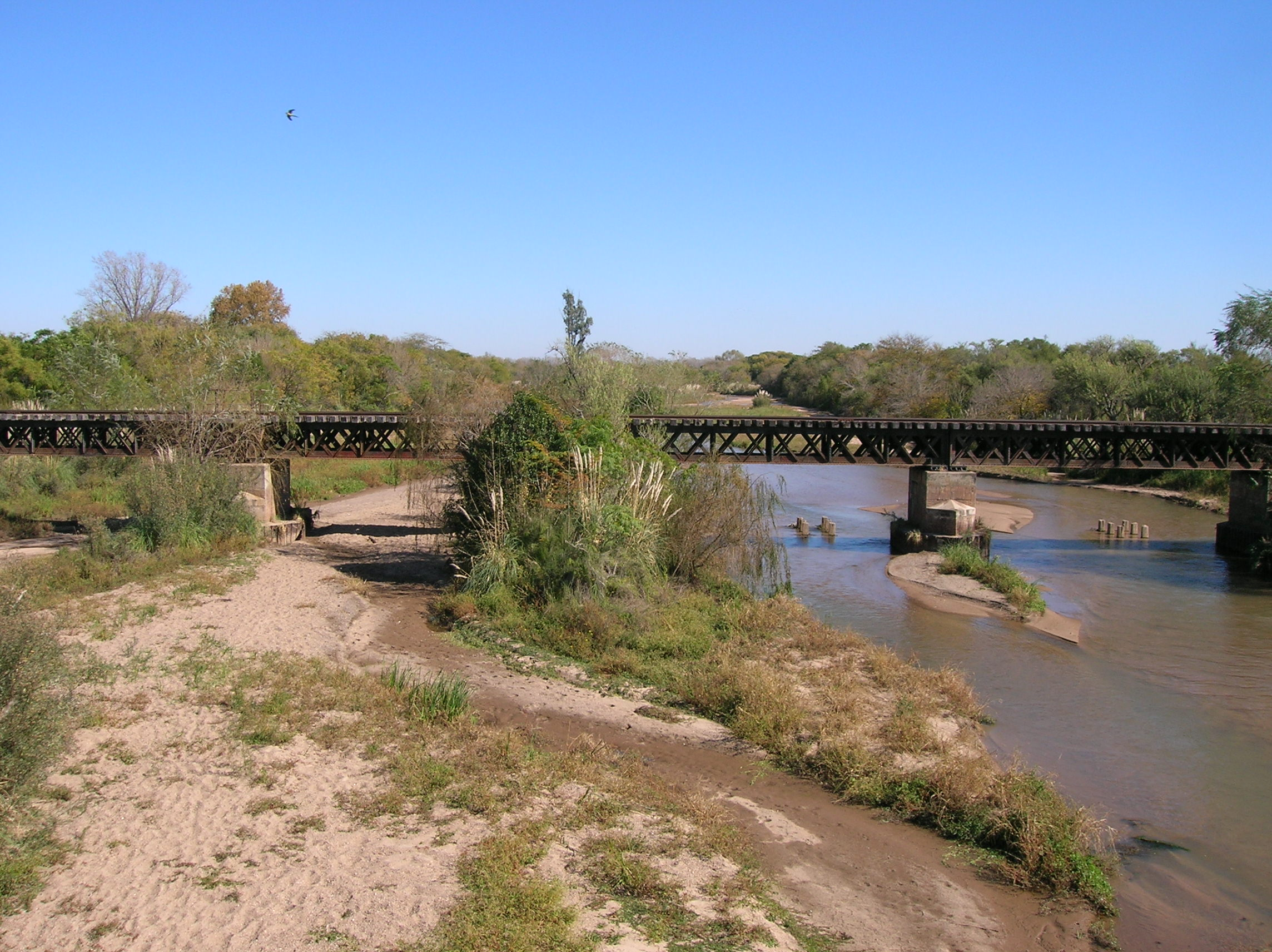
Railway bridge on the Segundo River

The Segundo River (Spanish: Río Segundo, 'Second River'), also known as Xanaes, is a river in the center-north of the province of Córdoba, Argentina. It is born in the Paravachasca Valley at the confluence of the Los Molinos and Anizacate rivers, on the eastern slopes of the Cumbres de Achala (Sierras Grandes), about 2,000 metres (6,600 ft) above mean sea level. It flows west–east and its course forms a reservoir at the Los Molinos Dam (at 31°49′S 64°32′W), which is employed to generate hydroelectricity. It then flows to the northeast and divides into two main arms, which empty in the Mar Chiquita salt lake, 340 kilometres (210 mi) from its origin. The average inflow is 12.2 cubic metres per second (430 cu ft/s).

Together with the Primero River (Suquía) and the Dulce River, it forms part of the basin of Central Argentina. On its path are located the following cities: Río Segundo, Pilar, Villa del Rosario, Tránsito, Arroyito, El Tío, Concepción del Tío, Marull, Balnearia and Altos de Chipión.

The alternative name of Xanaes is said to have its origin in the Native American language of the Comechingones, and has been almost lost until the 1980s, when Xanaes was started being used in maps, perhaps to attract tourism with a more exotic name, but the population of the area continues to use the denomination Segundo.
