= La Banda =

- City

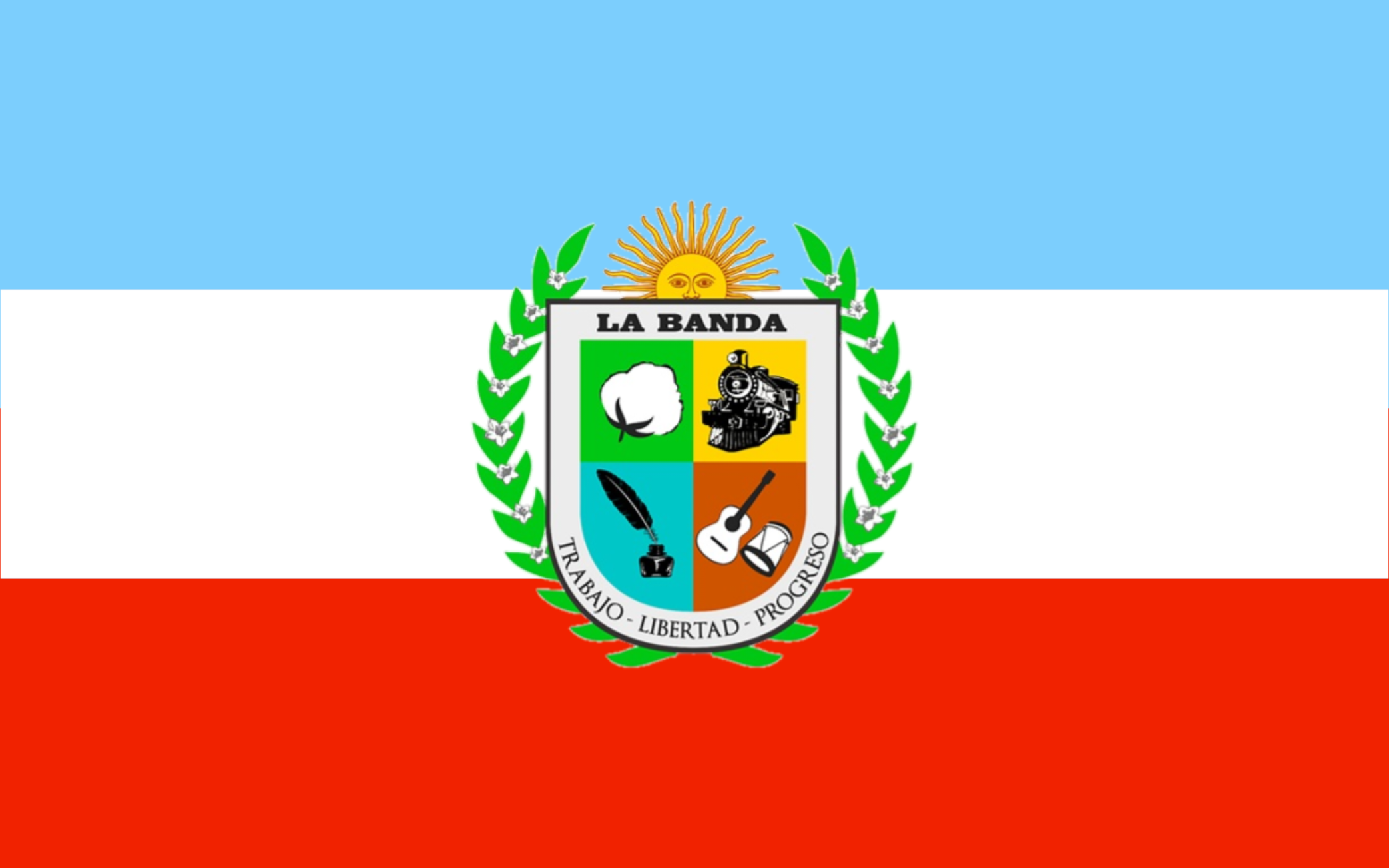
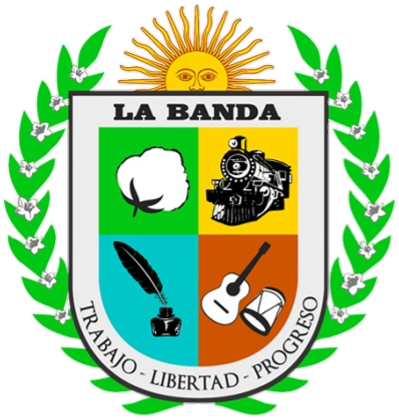
- Flag Coat of arms

- Location of La Banda in Argentina La Banda (Santiago del Estero Province)
- Coordinates: 27°44′S 64°15′W
- Country: Argentina
- Province: Santiago del Estero
- Department: Banda
- Founded: September 16, 1912
- Elevation: 191 m (627 ft)

Population (2010 census)
  - Total: 106,441
- Time zone: UTC−3 (ART)
- CPA base: G4300
- Dialing code: +54 385
- Climate: BSh
- Website: www.labanda.gov.ar

La Banda is a city in the province of Santiago del Estero, Argentina. It has about 95,000 inhabitants as per the 2001 census [INDEC], making it the second largest in the province. It is the head town of the Banda Department.

La Banda is located only 8 km away from the provincial capital Santiago del Estero, separated from it by the course of the Dulce River, which is crossed by two connecting bridges. The two cities form a metropolitan area with about 280,000 inhabitants. Close to it, the Dulce is turned into an artificial lake by the Los Quiroga Dam.

Besides the access to National Route 9 through Santiago del Estero, the city is linked to Tucumán and to Buenos Aires by a weekly train service of the Ferrocarril General Bartolomé Mitre.

La Banda is the birthplace of the infamous former provincial governor and caudillo Carlos Arturo Juárez.

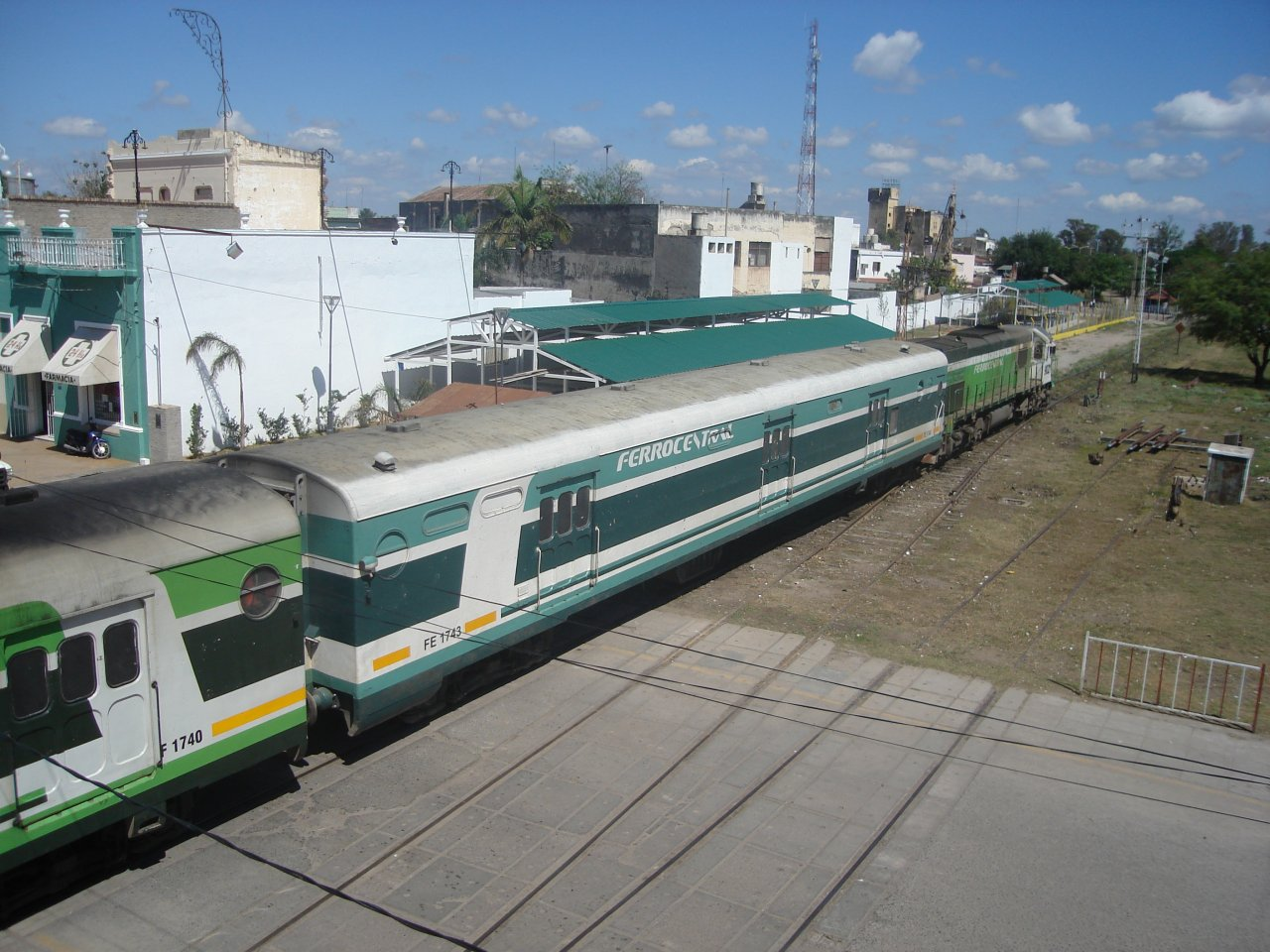
Ferrocentral Express leaving La Banda.

== History ==
La Banda emerged during the nineteenth century as a small agricultural town that supplied the neighboring city of Santiago del Estero. On September 16, 1912 La Banda was elevated to city status.

The first Maternity Hospital in La Banda was built by Decree No. 928 Series, dated 1941.

== Access to La Banda ==
- West Access 1: "Puente Carretero", through National Route RN 64 : Main entrance to the city, and most of the provincial traffic National Route RN 9 from Jujuy, Salta and Tucuman and RN 64 from Catamarca, to the junction with RN 34 to Rosario and Buenos Aires.
- West Access 2: "Puente Nuevo", by the "Autopista Santiago - La Banda".
- South Access: RN 34, for traffic going south.
- Access: by RP 5, from the Departamentos Figueroa y Alberdi.
- Access Northeast: RP 11 from Clodomira, La Aurora, Las Delicias.
- Northwest Access: RP 8 from Los Quiroga, Los Acosta, Chaupi Pozo, Ardiles.
- Southwest Access: by MOP 1, from La Bajada, Los Romanos, Los Pereyra, Brea Pozo.

== Basketball ==
La Banda is home to Ciclista Olímpico, member of the national Liga Nacional de Básquet and the international Liga Sudamericana de Básquetbol. The team plays its home games at the Vicente Rosales arena.

== Notable people ==
- René Houseman (1953–2018), Argentine Footballer
- Carlos Arturo Juárez (1916–2010), Argentine politician, governor of Santiago del Estero
- Rubén Marino Navarro (1933–2003), Argentine footballer
