= Gran Hotel Viena =

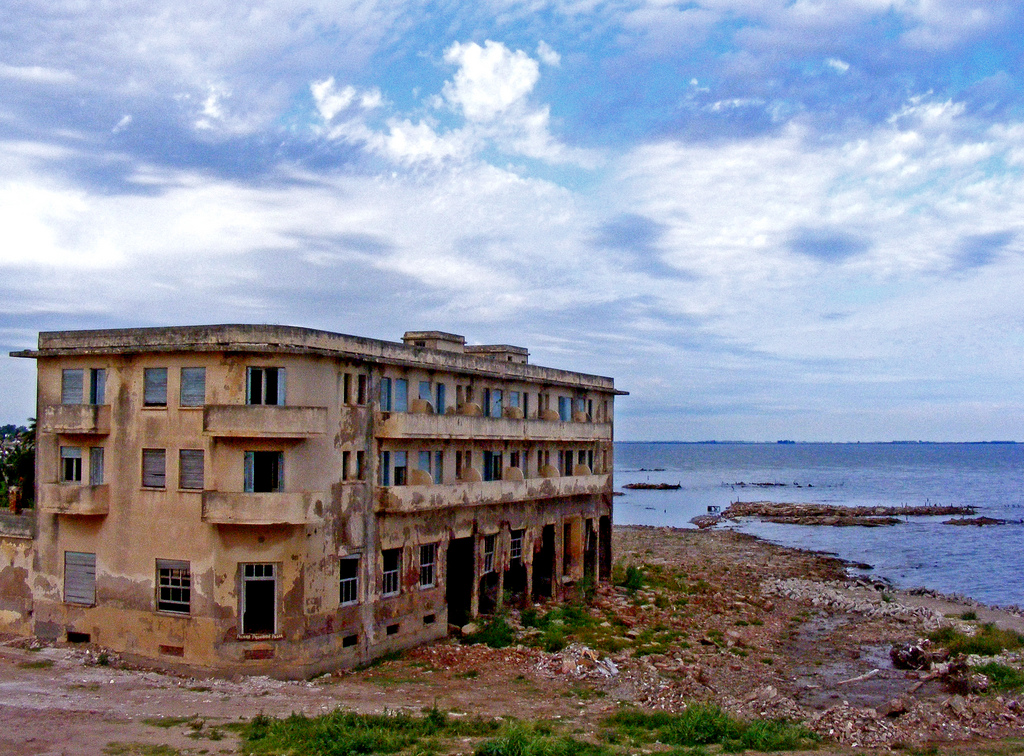
- Ruins of the former hotel

General information
- Status: Ruins
- Location: Calle San Liniers, Miramar, Córdoba Province, Argentina
- Current tenants: Museum
- Completed: 1945

Technical details
- Floor count: 3

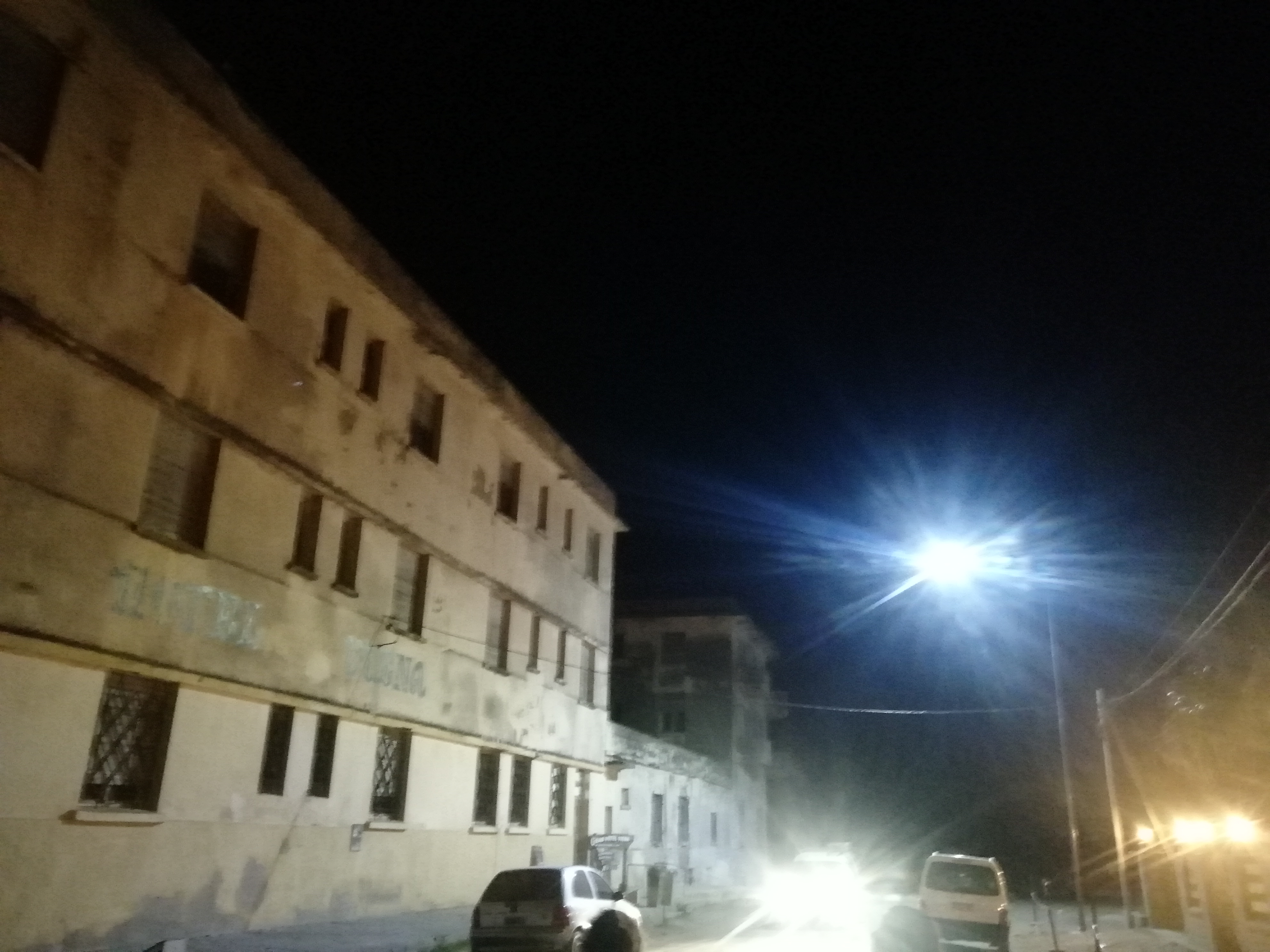
Exterior view of the building

The Gran Hotel Viena is a former hotel building in Miramar, Córdoba Province, Argentina, on the shore of Mar Chiquita Lake (also known as the Mar de Ansenuza). Built in stages between 1940 and 1945 for businessman Máximo Pahlke, it became one of the best-known hotels in the resort town. After repeated flooding from the lake, the hotel ceased operating in 1985. In the 21st century, its ruins have functioned as a museum and tourist attraction while the ownership of the property has remained the subject of legal disputes.

== History ==
In 1936, Máximo Pahlke, an executive of Mannesmann, arrived in Miramar with his family seeking relief through the town's mud and salt-water treatments. After deciding to invest in local tourism, he first operated a lodging business in partnership with the owner of an existing boarding house and later on his own. The name Viena was chosen in honour of Vienna, the birthplace of his wife, Melita Fleischberger.

Construction of the hotel began in 1940 and continued in stages until 1945. According to later press accounts, the complex offered amenities unusual for the region at the time, including a thermal pavilion with medical and massage services, a dining room for 200 guests, a bakery, an ice plant, a large wine cellar, its own electric generating plant, and a swimming pool divided into fresh-water and salt-water sections.

The Pahlke family left Miramar in 1946. The building subsequently passed through different periods of reduced use and abandonment. Severe flooding from Mar Chiquita, which began in 1977, progressively damaged the property. By 1980 the basement had flooded, and after looting and further deterioration, salt water reached the lower levels in 1985, forcing the hotel's final closure.

From the late 1980s, the local municipality preserved the ruins and organized guided visits. The building was declared local cultural heritage in 2005. By the early 21st century, the site was operating as the Museo Gran Hotel Viena. In 2021, Infobae reported an ongoing possession dispute between the Municipality of Miramar and Wandorf Company S.A., a company linked to the Pahlke family. In December 2025, the Court of Appeal of San Francisco ordered the municipality to restore possession of the property to Wandorf Company S.A.; the company stated that the museum would continue operating and that it planned to restore the building for renewed hotel use, while the municipality announced that it would appeal the ruling.

== Folklore and media ==
Because of its German ownership, its closure shortly after the end of World War II, and its later abandonment, the hotel became associated in local folklore with stories about Nazism, Nazi war criminals, and Adolf Hitler. Reliable reporting has noted, however, that no photographs, film footage, hotel registers, or other historical documentation have surfaced to support the claim that Hitler ever stayed there, and descendants of the Pahlke family have denied any connection to Nazism.

The building has also been promoted as a haunted site in local tourism and media. In 2010, it was featured in the Ghost Hunters International episode "Hitler's Ghost".
