= Río Segundo, Córdoba =

Rio Segundo
- City
- Location of Rio Segundo in Argentina
- Country: Argentina
- Province: Córdoba
- Department: Río Segundo

Government
  - Intendant: Darío Chesta (PJ)
- Highest elevation: 480 m (1,570 ft)
- Lowest elevation: 360 m (1,180 ft)

Population (2008 Est.)
  - Total: 23,000
- Demonym: Ríosegundense
- Time zone: UTC−3 (ART)

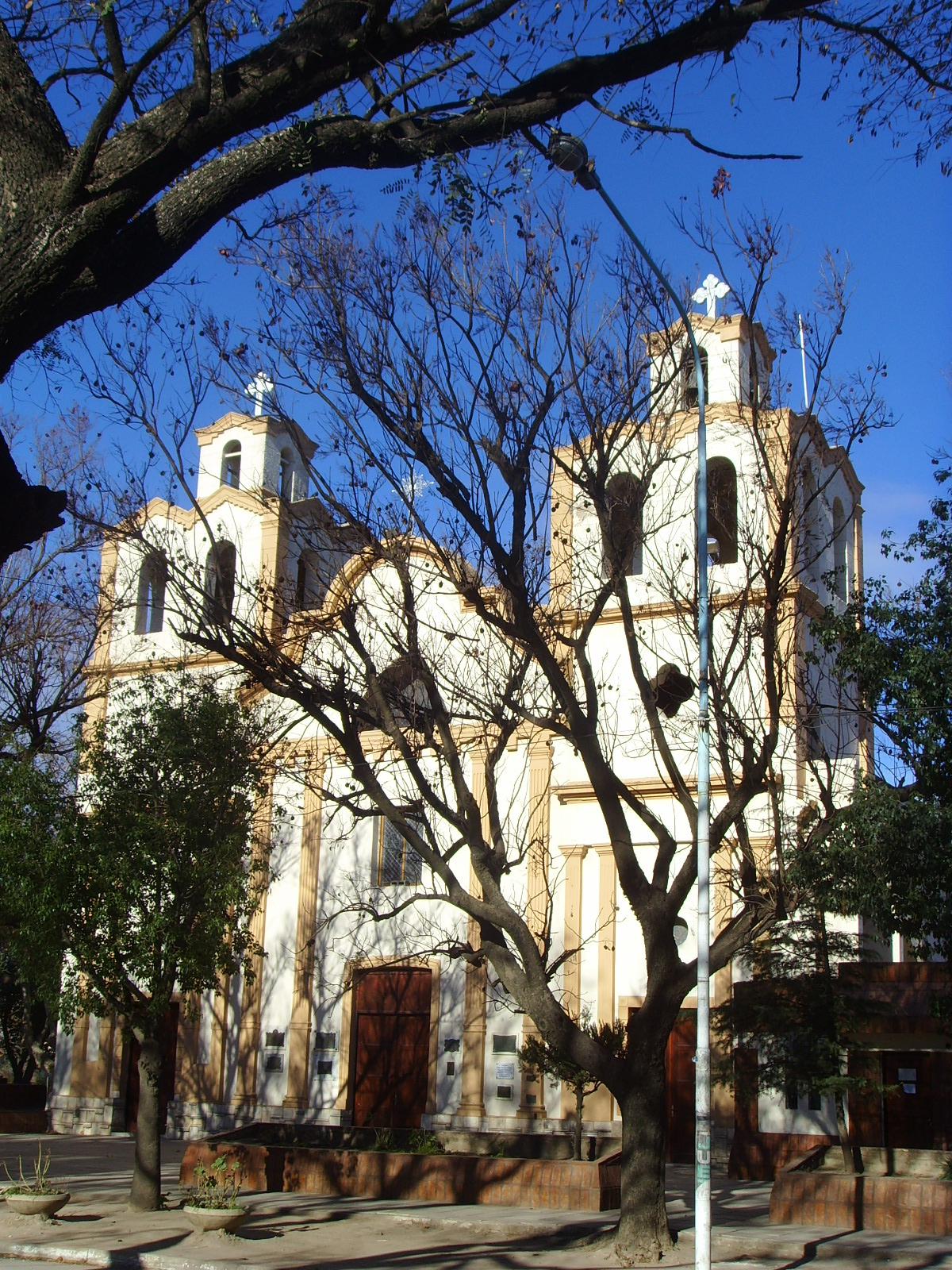
Church of Río Segundo

Rio Segundo, abbreviated as Río 2º, is a city located near the geographical center of Argentina, built on the banks of the river Rio Segundo about 40 kilometres (25 mi) east-southeast of Córdoba and about 660 kilometres (410 mi) west-northwest of Buenos Aires. It is the largest city of the Río Segundo County(department). Rio Segundo straddles National Route 9 and a main train line that runs from Córdoba to Buenos Aires. Pilar is a smaller city in size that resides on the other side of the river.

== Economy ==
Most of Rio Segundo's economic revenue comes from the creation of raw materials such as; cereals, meat, fodder, sand, and stone. There are several large meat processing plants (frigorificos) within city limits.

Georgalos, also found within city limits, is a large economic contributor for Rio Segundo making a variety of candies. Many workers travel by bus to Córdoba to work in the Fiat car manufacturing plant. Construction is also a large employer of Rio Segundo being that it is an old city that is in need of constant repair.

== Culture and Daily Life ==
Rio Segundo's culture has several significant influences. As a result, both of the prevalence of people of European descent and of conscious imitation of European styles in architecture, food, and dance, Argentina as a whole is known by many as Little Europe. Another big influencer is the gaucho and their traditional country lifestyle of self-reliance. Finally, indigenous American traditions (like mate tea drinking) have been absorbed into the general cultural melting pot.

Most of Rio Segundo's residents enjoy traditional Argentine foods that are influenced by cuisine from Spain, Italy, Germany, France and other European countries, and many foods from those countries such as pasta, sausages, and desserts are common in the city's diet. Argentina has a wide variety of staple foods, which include empanadas, a stuffed pastry; locro, a mixture of corn, beans, meat, bacon, onion, and gourd; and chorizo, a spicy sausage. Other popular items include facturas (Viennese-style pastry), Dulce de Leche and mate, Argentina's national beverage.

== History ==
Rio Segundo held the aborigine name "Chanaes" or "Xanaes" which was actually the name of the river itself, however, the name was used for the area surrounding the river as well. Spanish Conquistadores were the first Europeans to enter the area and were originally following the river to the Atlantic Ocean. Prior to European discovery Rio Segundo was uninhabited it is believed that the area was initially founded by Spanish Conquistadores on December 25, 1576 and for that reason the area was given the name "Navidad" which translated means Christmas. Later the Spanish Founder Jerónimo Luís de Cabrera changed the name to Río Segundo.

The first establishment in the Rio Segundo area was a post office on the shores of the river. The post office was the beginning of growth for Rio Segundo; many travelers would stop at Rio Segundo prior to crossing the river. Prior to 1870, when the first bridge was built, people who wished to cross the river had to tread the waters with their carriages and handcarts with hopes that the unpredictable depths and currents wouldn't wash them away.

Rio Segundo remained a wayside village until the introduction of the train to the area. The newly built railroad running from Buenos Aires to Córdoba passed directly through Río Segundo and brought even more growth to the area. In 1883 the city's first school was founded, and one year later the cornerstone of the first church was laid. That same year Rio Segundo's first industry came by way of Sr. Andrónico Gómez who was in the industry of beer making. In 1888 the city was granted a municipal building and elected their first mayor, Mayor Luís Loredo.

It wasn't until 1916 that the first road going from Córdoba to Rio Segundo finally passed through to Villa Maria and on to Buenos Aires with the construction of a new bridge for automobiles. Also during this time many World War European refugees inhabited the area bringing with them their large variety of cultures.

== Outstanding Riosegundenses ==
- Hernán Boyero, former football player and coach
