= Narciso Marull =

Narciso Marull y Torrent

Asentista de Medicina of the Río de la Plata
- In office c.1780–1809

Personal details
- Born: 1747 Catalonia, Spain
- Died: c.1820 Buenos Aires, Argentina
- Occupation: Medicine merchant
- Profession: Apothecary
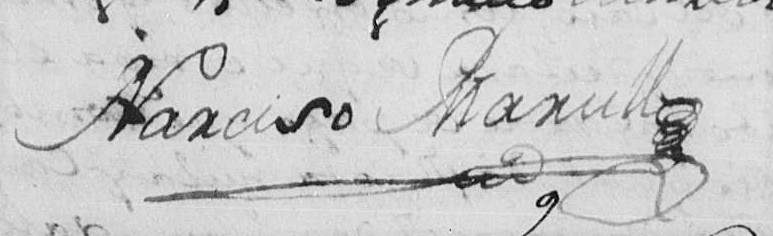
- Signature

Narciso Marull (1747-c.1820) was a Spanish apothecary and merchant, who served as Asentista de Medicina in the Real Audiencia of Buenos Aires.

== Biography ==
Narciso Marull was born in Cassà de la Selva (Catalonia), son of Juan Manuel Marull and Isabel Torrent. He settled in Buenos Aires towards the end of 1770, and was married in the Metropolitan Cathedral on February 3, 1788, to his cousin sister, Concepción Marull, daughter of Francisco Marull and Juana Saleza.

He was the owner of the first drugstore in Buenos Aires, his establishment was known as "Botica del Colegio", located in the streets Santísima Trinidad y San Carlos (current Bolívar and Alsina) Monserrat, was founded by his uncle Francisco Marull in 1777. In 1804, Narciso Marull, was appointed as Examinador de Farmacia and Revisor de Medicinas (Pharmacy Examiner - Medical inspector).

During the English invasions of Rio de la Plata, he had provided medicines and provided his aid to the patriots wounded. In 1809, Marull was involved in Mutiny of Álzaga, he was imprisoned released and released after paying a fine of 3,000 pesos.

After the opening of the free market in Buenos Aires, Narciso Marull Torrent maintained commercial ties with the British. On November 8, 1810, the English schooner "Alarm" arrived in the Port of Buenos Aires from Guernsey, bringing goods that included wine and gin to the consignment of Narciso Marull.

His family was related to the famous lawyer José Presas y Marull, an anglophile, who served as secretary of Carlota Joaquina of Spain.
