= Hernán Boyero =

Argentine-Bolivian footballer and manager

Personal information
- Full name: Hernán Eduardo Boyero
- Date of birth: December 30, 1979 (age 46)
- Place of birth: Río Segundo, Argentina
- Height: 1.93 m (6 ft 4 in)
- Position: Striker

Senior career*
Years	Team	Apps	(Gls)
2002–2004 / 2006	Instituto de Córdoba	84	(17)
2005	Juventud Antoniana	16	(1)
2005–2006	Tigre	35	(6)
2007–2009	Blooming	103	(51)
2010	→ Millonarios (loan)	11	(2)
2010–2013	Blooming	104	(41)
2013–2014	Argentinos Juniors	25	(6)
2014	Tristán Suárez	9	(1)

Managerial career
- 2015–2016: Blooming
- * Club domestic league appearances and goals as of 14 November 2013

Hernán Eduardo Boyero (born December 30, 1979, in Río Segundo, Córdoba Province) is a retired Argentine-Bolivian football striker. Boyero is best remembered for his time at Blooming, where he netted 92 goals in 207 league matches, becoming a club legend due to his great eye for goal and the intensity he always played with.

== Club career ==
Boyero started his playing career in 2002 with Instituto Atlético Central Córdoba in the Primera B Nacional, which is part of the regionalized second division in Argentina. At the end of the 2003 season, Instituto gained promotion to the Argentine Primera División; however; the team only survived one season and was relegated in 2004. The following year Boyero joined Juventud Antoniana, and not long after he transferred to Tigre, where he made a short spell before returning to Instituto to play until the conclusion of the 2006 season.

In February 2007, Boyero went abroad signing for Bolivian first division club Blooming. Since his debut with the celestes, he became an emblematic figure for the club and a favourite with the Blooming fans because of his commitment on the pitch.

In January 2010, he was loaned out to Colombian club Millonarios for a six-month period, but the club chose not to take up their option to purchase, and the player returned to Blooming. On July 25, 2013, Boyero officially naturalized Bolivian.

On July 27, 2013, and after having played six years with Blooming, Boyero returned to his native country to fulfill his dream of playing in Primera División with club Argentinos Juniors under manager Ricardo Caruso Lombardi, who previously coached him at Tigre. He made 25 appearances and scored 6 goals playing for El Bicho. After the team was relegated to Primera B Nacional, Boyero transferred to Tristán Suárez in July 2014. A knee injury expedited his retirement from football five months later at age 35.

== Club titles ==
Season	Club	Title
2008	Blooming	Copa Aerosur
2009 (C)	Blooming	Liga de Fútbol Profesional Boliviano
