= Río Grande Hydroelectric Complex =

Dam in Calamuchita Department, Córdoba Province, Argentina

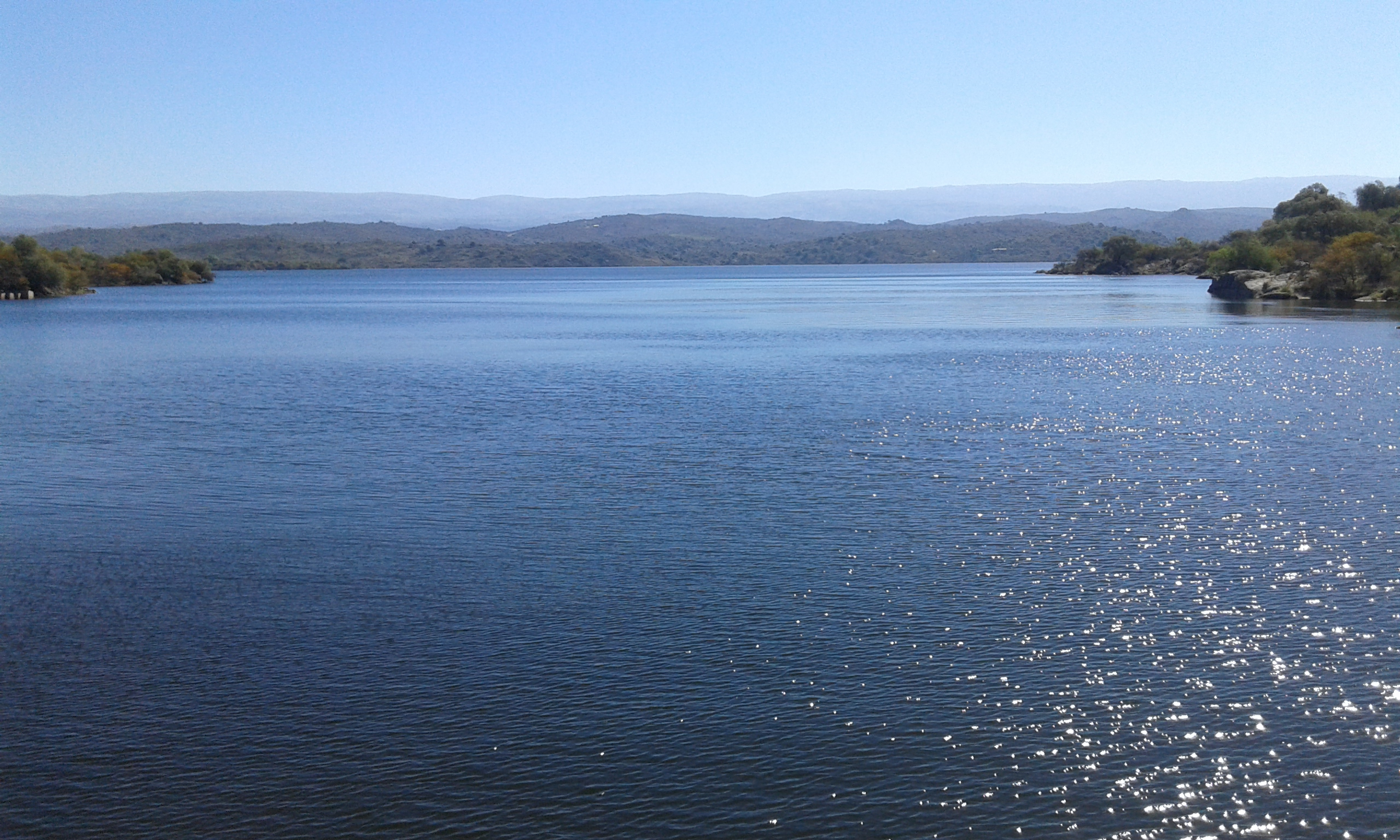
- Country: Argentina
- Location: Calamuchita Department, Córdoba Province
- Coordinates: 32°13′18.31″S 64°38′11.48″W
- Status: Operational
- Construction began: 1976
- Opening date: 1986
- Construction cost: US$315 million
- Owner: Provincial Power Company Córdoba

Upper reservoir
- Creates: Cerro Pelado Reservoir
- Total capacity: 3,675,000 m^{3} (2,979 acre⋅ft)

Lower reservoir
- Creates: Arroyo Corto Reservoir
- Total capacity: 1,600,000 m^{3} (1,300 acre⋅ft)

Power Station
- Hydraulic head: 185 m (607 ft)
- Turbines: 4 x 187.5 MW reversible Francis-type
- Installed capacity: 750 MW (1,010,000 hp)
- Annual generation: 977 GWh (3,520 TJ)

The Río Grande Hydroelectric Complex is a pumped-storage hydroelectric power station in the Calamuchita Department of Córdoba Province, Argentina. The complex consists of two dams and a power station in the Cerro Pelado Valley. Aside from power generation, the complex also serves to control floods and provide municipal water. The two dams on the Tercero River are the Cerro Pelado Dam which forms the upper reservoir and the Arroyo Corto Dam which forms the lower reservoir. The Cerro Pelado dam is 104 m (341 ft) high and 410.5 metres (1,347 ft) long while the Arroyo Corto is 50 metres (160 ft) tall and 1,500 metres (4,900 ft) in length. Water from the upper reservoir is sent to the underground power station during periods of high power demand. The power station contains four 187.5 megawatts (251,400 hp) reversible Francis turbine-generators. Water from the power station is discharged into the lower reservoir. During periods of lower power demand such as at night, water is pumped with the same turbines back up to the upper reservoir for use in peak hours. The difference in elevation between the two reservoirs affords a hydraulic head of 185 metres (607 ft). Construction on the complex began in 1976 and the generators were commissioned in 1986.

== See also ==
- List of power stations in Argentina
