= Banda Department =

- Department
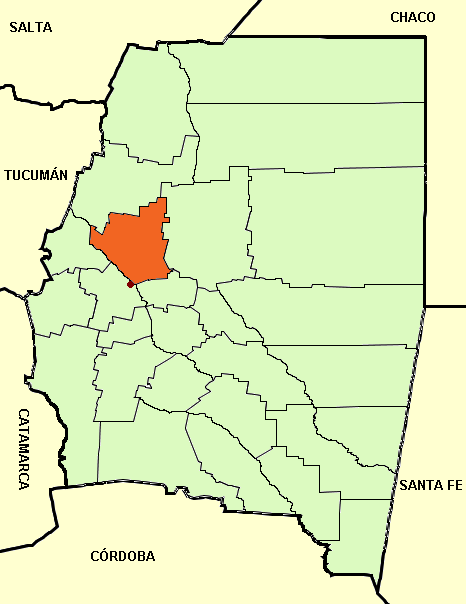
- Location of Banda Department within Santiago del Estero Province
- Coordinates: 28°38′10″S 65°7′1″W
- Country: Argentina
- Province: Santiago del Estero
- Head town: La Banda

Area
  - Total: 3,597 km^{2} (1,389 sq mi)

Population (2010)
  - Total: 142,279
  - Density: 39.55/km^{2} (102.4/sq mi)
- Time zone: UTC-3 (ART)

Banda Department (Spanish: Departamento Banda) is a department of Argentina in Santiago del Estero Province. The capital city of the department is situated in La Banda.
