= Cacheuta Spa =

Bathing establishment in Argentina

Coordinates: 33°02′S 69°06′W

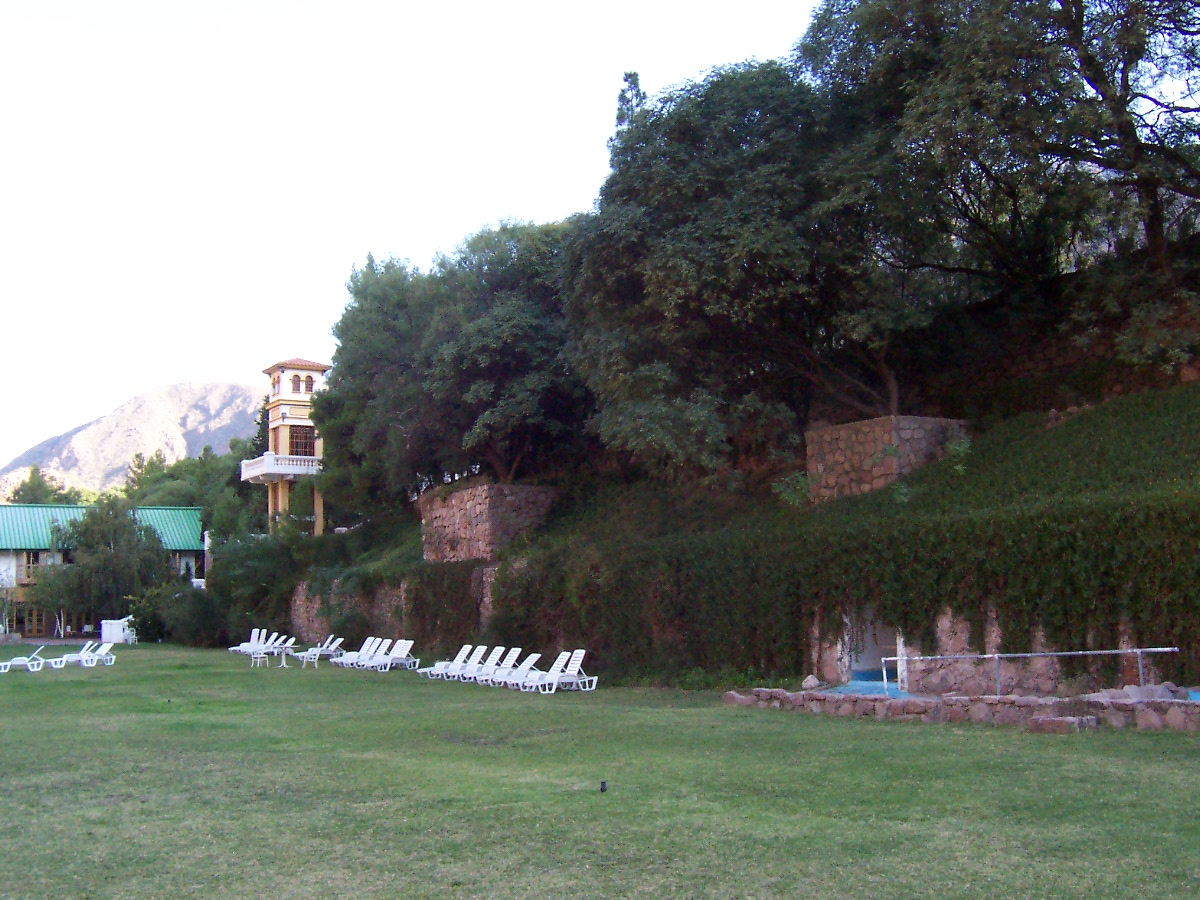
Cacheuta Spa, 2009. The new hotel can be seen on the left and the ruins of the old above the terrace to the right. The trees grow from the railway platform to which the campanile originally gave access.

The Cacheuta Spa (Spanish: Termas de Cacheuta, IPA: [ˈteɾmas ðe kaˈtʃewta]) is a bathing establishment in Argentina exploiting the natural hot springs at Cacheuta on the Mendoza River in the foothills of the Andes. The spa lies on the old road leading from the city of Mendoza to the Uspallata Pass over the mountains into Chile.

== The first spa ==
This area of the Andes is known for many hot springs. However, in the heyday of the Argentine’s boom in 1904 the spa at Cacheuta was developed on a massive scale. Financed by the issue of shares to speculative investors, a very substantial and luxurious hotel was built on the hillside above the river, with a bathing establishment below consisting of a large space lit from roof lanterns with individual bathrooms leading off it.

The establishment achieved particular success through its link with the Transandine Railway, which opened in 1910. The line ran straight past the hotel, and a special railway station was erected there, about 1 km east of the station in Cacheuta village. Passengers alighting on the platform at the spa station would descend a staircase directly into the spa hotel, while their luggage would be brought down in a lift constructed within a tower modelled on an Italian campanile. Special packages and excursions were offered, and a wide range of glittering special events were celebrated in the local press.

In 1934, a glacial flood in the Mendoza canyon completely destroyed the spa. The establishment never recovered.

== The second spa ==
In 1986, a new less ambitious project was taken forward. Within the ruins of the original buildings a new smaller hotel was constructed, only the campanile surviving from the former establishment; on the lawns there is a formal swimming pool. Bathing facilities are being developed at a lower level nearer the river, offering mud baths and pools at various temperatures; massage and other therapies are also offered, along with hiking, horse-riding and other pursuits unrelated to bathing.

The construction of a dam at Potrerillos further up the river has eliminated the possibility of a repetition of the disaster of 1934. However, it has also flooded the road to the frontier (now by-passed by a major arterial road a few miles to the south), while the railway was abandoned in 1984, so the spa is no longer en route to other destinations – though at only about half an hour’s drive from the centre of Mendoza it attracts a good lunchtime trade at the weekends, as well as Argentine patrons of the baths. Foreign tourism is less noticeable.

== Climate ==
Climate data for Cacheuta (1941–1950)
Month	Jan	Feb	Mar	Apr	May	Jun	Jul	Aug	Sep	Oct	Nov	Dec	Year
Record high °C (°F)	39.2 (102.6)	37.5 (99.5)	33.2 (91.8)	30.8 (87.4)	27.0 (80.6)	27.6 (81.7)	29.5 (85.1)	28.5 (83.3)	30.0 (86.0)	32.8 (91.0)	36.8 (98.2)	36.0 (96.8)	39.2 (102.6)
Mean daily maximum °C (°F)	29.2 (84.6)	28.1 (82.6)	24.6 (76.3)	20.7 (69.3)	16.4 (61.5)	13.4 (56.1)	13.1 (55.6)	14.5 (58.1)	18.4 (65.1)	22.5 (72.5)	25.8 (78.4)	26.9 (80.4)	21.3 (70.3)
Daily mean °C (°F)	21.3 (70.3)	20.1 (68.2)	16.8 (62.2)	13.1 (55.6)	9.0 (48.2)	6.7 (44.1)	5.7 (42.3)	7.1 (44.8)	10.7 (51.3)	14.2 (57.6)	17.9 (64.2)	20.6 (69.1)	13.6 (56.5)
Mean daily minimum °C (°F)	15.6 (60.1)	14.3 (57.7)	11.5 (52.7)	8.0 (46.4)	4.2 (39.6)	1.8 (35.2)	0.4 (32.7)	1.8 (35.2)	4.8 (40.6)	8.3 (46.9)	11.9 (53.4)	14.7 (58.5)	8.1 (46.6)
Record low °C (°F)	8.5 (47.3)	6.4 (43.5)	2.0 (35.6)	−2.0 (28.4)	−6.5 (20.3)	−8.0 (17.6)	−9.0 (15.8)	−8.6 (16.5)	−5.2 (22.6)	0.0 (32.0)	0.0 (32.0)	1.9 (35.4)	−9.0 (15.8)
Average precipitation mm (inches)	33.0 (1.30)	22.3 (0.88)	25.0 (0.98)	17.6 (0.69)	19.6 (0.77)	5.8 (0.23)	16.9 (0.67)	19.6 (0.77)	19.5 (0.77)	37.8 (1.49)	22.9 (0.90)	14.1 (0.56)	254.4 (10.02)
Average relative humidity (%)	49	51	60	64	66	63	61	59	52	48	44	44	55
Source: Secretaria de Mineria
