= Mar Chiquita Lake =

Salt lake located in the northeast of the province of Córdoba, in central Argentina

Mar Chiquita
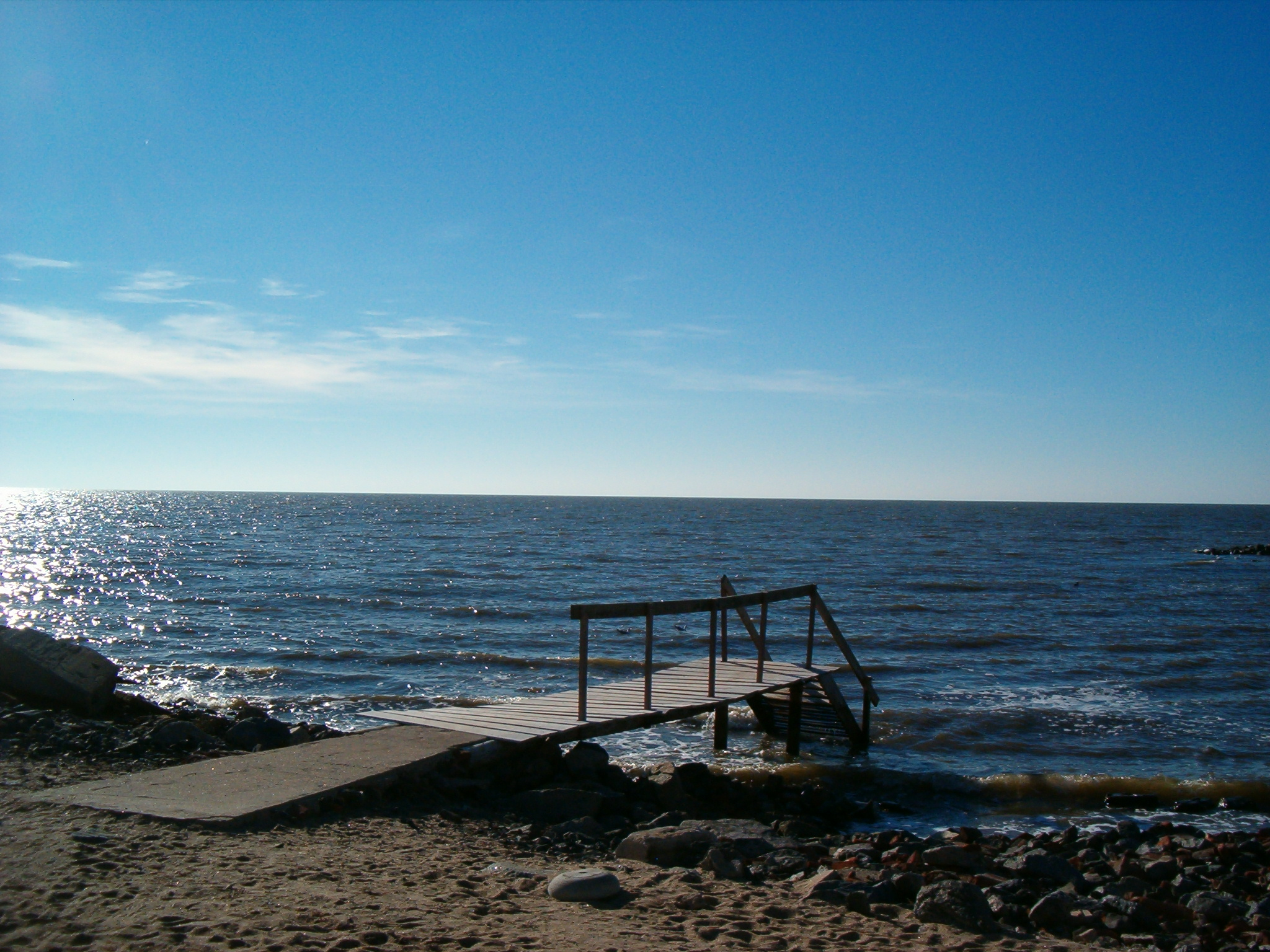

- Location within Argentina
- Location: Córdoba Province / Santiago del Estero Province, Argentina
- Coordinates: 30°30′S 62°40′W
- Type: endorheic salt lake
- Primary inflows: Dulce River; Saladillo River
- Basin countries: Argentina
- Surface area: 2,000–6,000 km^{2} (770–2,320 sq mi)
- Surface elevation: 66–69 m (217–226 ft)
- Islands: Médano Island

Ramsar Wetland
- Official name: Bañados del Río Dulce y Laguna de Mar Chiquita
- Designated: 28 May 2002
- Reference no.: 1176

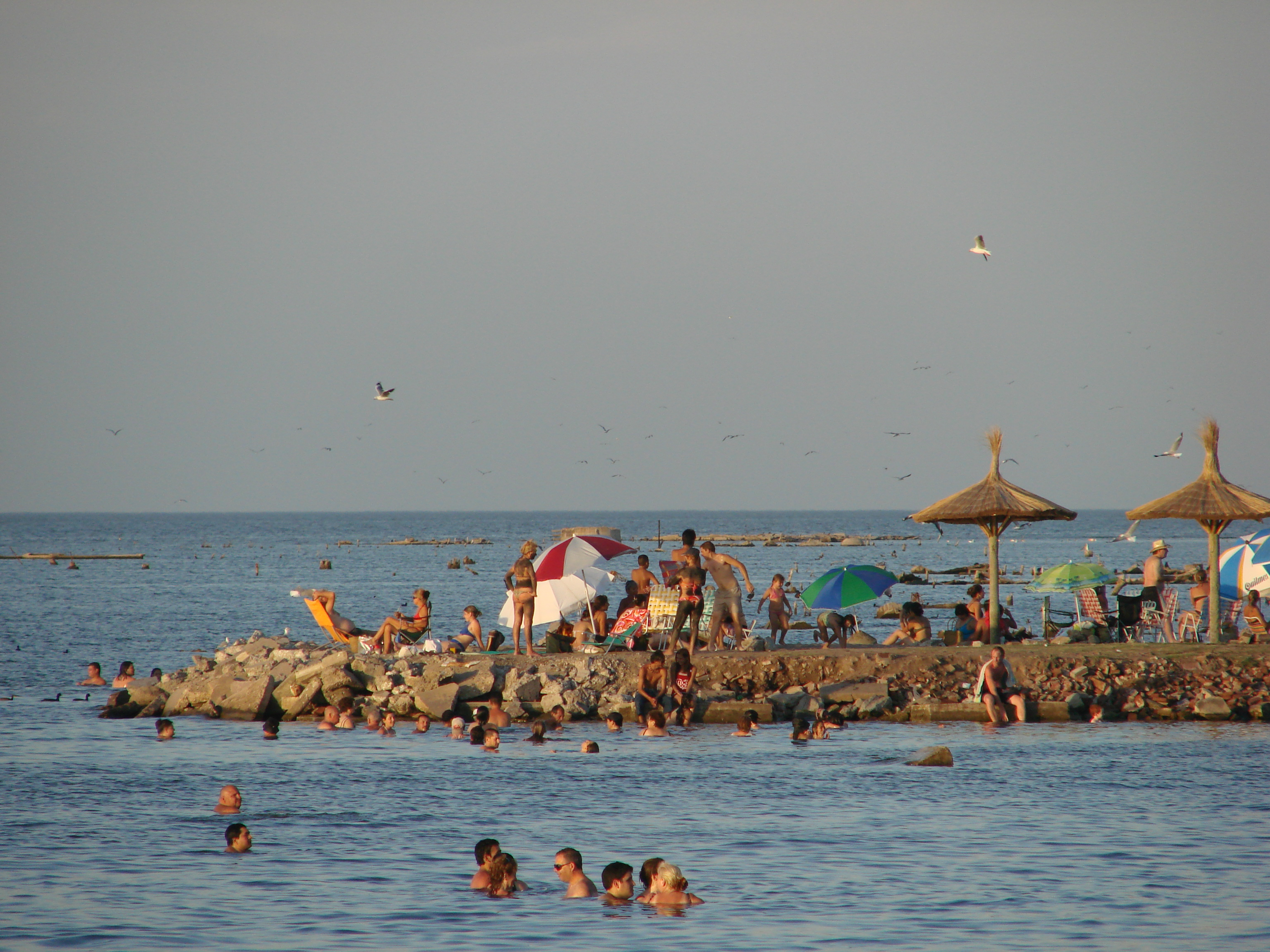
Miramar, Córdoba, the beach in the summer.

Mar Chiquita (in Spanish literally "Little Sea") or Mar de Ansenuza is an endorheic salt lake located in the northeast of the province of Córdoba, in central Argentina. The northeast corner of the lake also extends into southeastern Santiago del Estero Province. It is the largest of the naturally occurring saline lakes in Argentina. The lake is located in parts of five departments in the two provinces.

The lake is in the Argentine Espinal ecoregion. It occupies the southern part of a depression that measures about 50 miles/80 km (north–south) by 28 miles/45 km (east–west). Its surface area varies considerably, given its shallow depth (about 10 m), and ranges between 2,000 and 6,000 km^{2} (770 and 2,320 mi^{2}).

== Hydrology ==
Mar Chiquita is fed primarily by the saline waters of the Dulce River, coming from Santiago del Estero in the north after being joined by the Saladillo River. The lands around the lower course of the Dulce and Mar Chiquita are wetlands, populated by a large biodiversity (especially aquatic birds). From the southwest the lake receives the flow of the Primero/Suquía and the Segundo/Xanaes rivers, as well as several streams; these inflows vary greatly from dry to rainy seasons. The salinity of Mar Chiquita is quite variable, with measured extremes ranging from 250 g/L in times of low water levels to around 40 g/L in very humid years, such as in the decade following 1977, when record rainfall flooded much of Miramar, Córdoba.

There are several islands in the lake, the most important one being the Médano Island. Mar Chiquita is slowly diminishing in volume due to increased evaporation and elevation of its bottom, and is ultimately bound to turn into a salt flat. According to the Mono Lake Committee, Aves Argentinas and Argentina Natura International are attempting to establish "the largest National Park in Argentina at Laguna Mar Chiquita, the" (northern) "winter home to large concentrations of Wilson's Phalaropes." The lake was formerly home to a growing tourism industry, and was the site of the Gran Hotel Viena, a luxurious, lakefront establishment which functioned from 1945 to 1980, and has been the center of numerous mysteries and controversies.

In June 2022, the surrounding wetlands and the lake were officially designated as Ansenuza National Park, becoming the largest national park in Argentina. The park protects over 19,000 km2 of lagoons, marshes, and forests, and is considered one of the most important wetlands in South America. It is a key breeding ground for three South American flamingo species, as well as a critical stopover for migratory birds along the Atlantic Flyway.
