= Los Quiroga Dam =

Dam in Santiago del Estero, Argentina

Coordinates: 27.6510°S 64.3618°W

The Los Quiroga Dam (in Spanish, Dique Los Quiroga) is a dam on the Dulce River, in the province of Santiago del Estero, Argentina. It is located near the provincial capital Santiago del Estero and the city of La Banda. It was completed in 1956.

Los Quiroga is both a level-keeping and a diversion dam, consisting of a reinforced concrete wall that is 390 metres (1,280 ft) long and 7 metres (23 ft) tall, continued by a 1,200 metres (3,900 ft) long earth wall. It has 32 floodgates.

The dam creates a reservoir that is used mainly for fishing and attracts tourism due to its natural environment. Near the dam lies the Los Quiroga Hydroelectric Power Plant, which was inaugurated in 1963.
