= Potrerillos Dam =

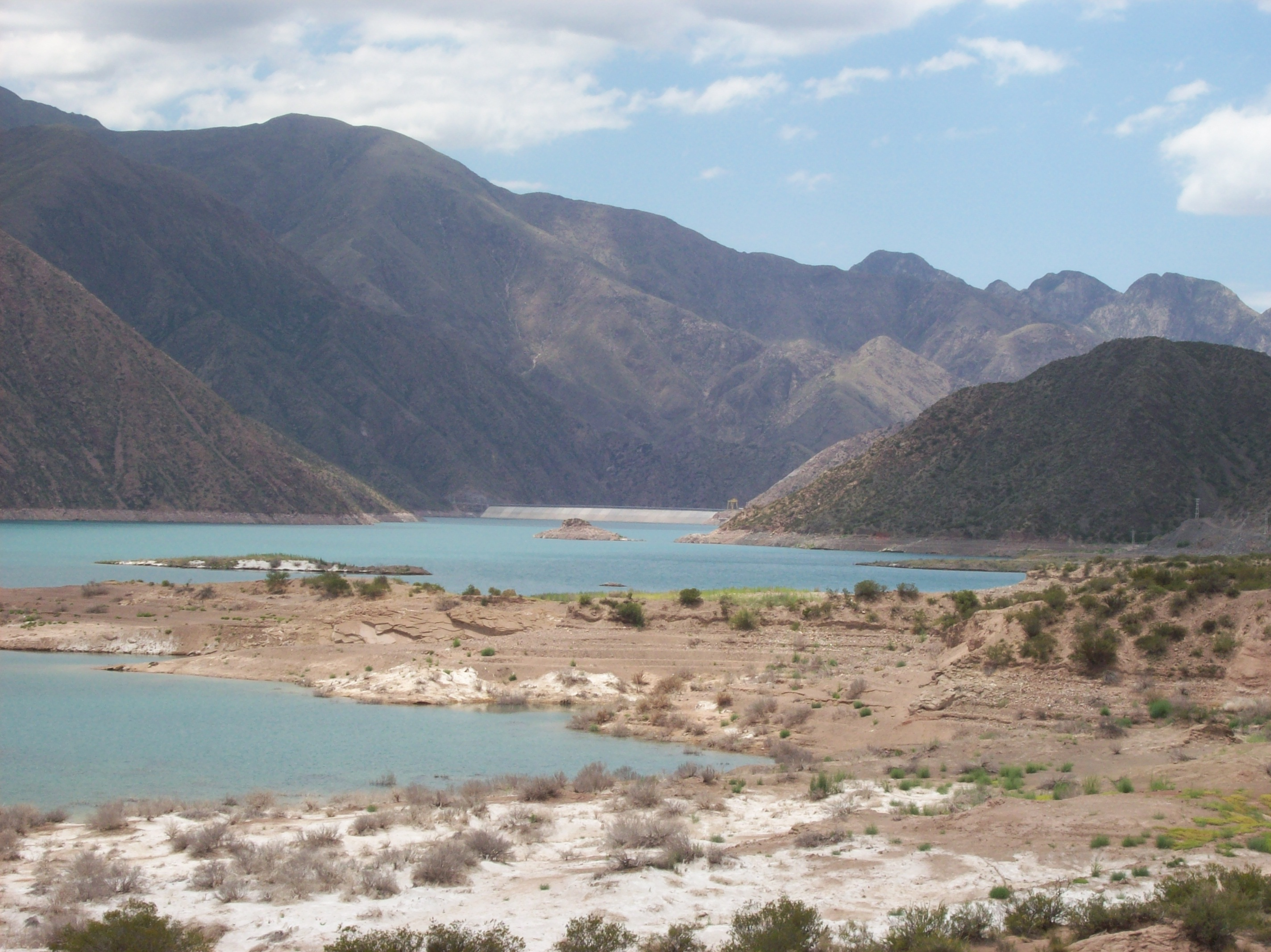
- View of Potrerillos Reservoir with the dam in the distance

- Location within Argentina
- Location: Mendoza, Argentina
- Coordinates: 32°59′42″S 69°07′33″W
- Opening date: 2003

Dam and spillways
- Type of dam: Concrete-faced rockfill
- Height: 116 m (381 ft)
- Length: 395 m (1,296 ft)
- Spillway type: Morning-glory
- Spillway capacity: 1,800 m^{3}/s (63,566 cu ft/s)

Reservoir
- Creates: Potrerillos Reservoir
- Total capacity: 420,000 dam^{3} (340,500 acre⋅ft)
- Surface area: 1,300 ha (3,212 acres)

Power Station
- Turbines: Cacheuta: 4 x 30 MW Francis; Álvarez Condarco: 2 x 24 MW Francis, 1 x 13 MW Francis
- Installed capacity: Cacheuta: 120 MW; Álvarez Condarco: 61 MW; Total: 181 MW
- Annual generation: 850 GWh

Potrerillos Dam is located on the Mendoza River, in Argentina's Potrerillos Valley. The dam was built between 1999 and 2003 by a consortium consisting of Industrias Metalúrgicas Pescarmona (IMPSA) and Cartellone to provide flood control, hydroelectricity and irrigation water. The dam cost US$ 312 million to construct. Located about 30 kilometres (19 mi) southwest of Mendoza, the concrete-faced rockfill dam is 116 metres (381 ft) high and 395 metres (1,296 ft) long, impounding the 12 km (7.5 mi) long Potrerillos Reservoir.

The dam and reservoir have lost significant storage capacity due to the high silt content of the Mendoza River. When the reservoir was first filled in 2003, the capacity was estimated at 627,000 cubic decametres (508,000 acre⋅ft), with a total surface area of 1,500 hectares (3,700 acres). This has since decreased to 420,000 dam^{3} (340,000 acre⋅ft) with a surface area of 1,300 ha (3,200 acres). The reduction in capacity has threatened the flood control capability of the dam, with the concern that the emergency spillway may become inadequate to pass high flood flows as the reservoir loses its capability to retain them.

== Power plants ==
Water from the reservoir is diverted into a series of two hydroelectric power plants, Power Station Cacheuta and Power Station Álvarez Condarco, with a combined capacity of 181 megawatts (243,000 hp). From the dam, a 4,274 m (14,022 ft) tunnel furnishes water to four Francis turbines at Cacheuta with a capacity of 120 megawatts (160,000 hp). The water then flows through a second tunnel to power three Francis turbines at Álvarez Condarco with a 61 megawatts (82,000 hp) capacity. The entire hydroelectric complex generates upwards of 850 million kilowatt hours per year, or 20% of the electrical consumption in Mendoza Province.

== Accidents ==
In December 2015, A helicopter which was being used for filming an MTV reality show The Challenge has crashed into the reservoir killing the pilot and a technician.

== See also ==
- List of power stations in Argentina

== Works cited ==
- Zhang, Changkuan; Tang, Hongwu (2009). Advances in Water Resources and Hydraulic Engineering: Proceedings of 16th IAHR-APD Congress and 3rd Symposium of IAHR-ISHS. Springer. ISBN 978-3-54089-465-0.
