= Quinto River =

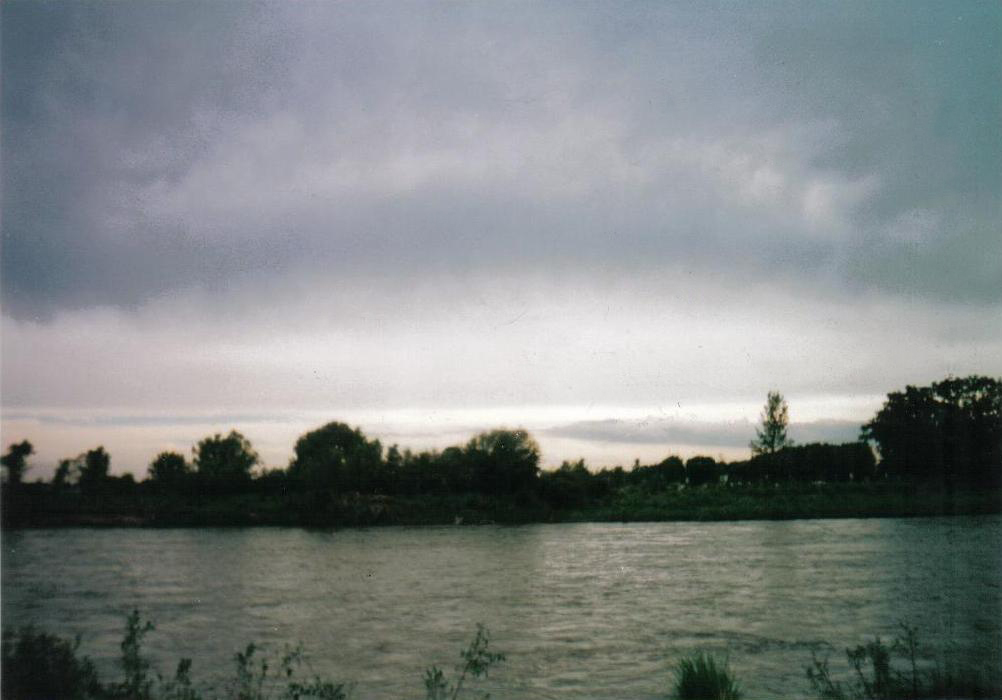
- Quinto River passing Villa Mercedes (2008)

Location
- Country: Argentina

Physical characteristics
- Source
  - location: Sierra de San Luis
- Mouth
  - location: Bañados de la Amarga
  - coordinates: 33.1139°S 66.0027°W
- Length: 375 km (233 mi) (or more)
- Basin size: 1,165 km^{2} (450 sq mi)
- Discharge
  - average: 6.22 m^{3}/s (220 cu ft/s)

The Quinto River (Spanish: Río Quinto), also known as the Popopis, is in central Argentina.

It rises in Sierra de San Luis near the Retama mountain in San Luis Province. The Quinto flows to the southeast. Near the Paso de las Carreteras dam, the Quinto River begins to flow through the Pampas. It passes Villa Mercedes city, where it is about 45 metres (148 ft) wide. It then flows through Córdoba Province. Finally, it flows into the Bañados de la Amarga swamps in its lower course. During the rainy season the Quinto's waters sometimes rise sufficiently to reach Santa Fé and Buenos Aires provinces and sometimes even as far as the Salado River basin. The Quinto's length is dependent on the season. It can vary from 375 kilometres (233 mi) in the dry period to 878 kilometres (546 mi) after heavy rain.
