= Potrerillos, Mendoza =

Coordinates: 32.950°S 69.183°W

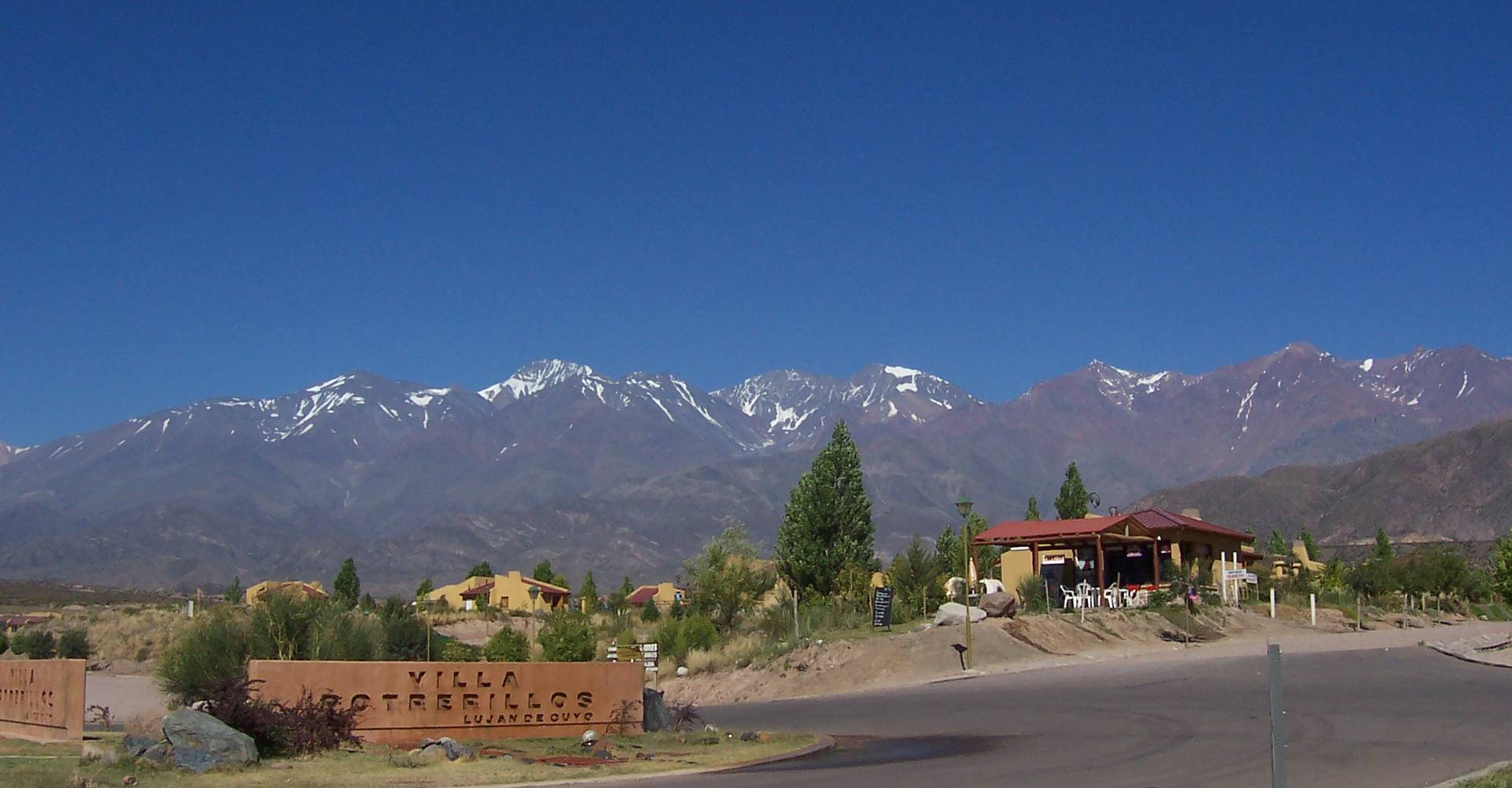
Villa Potrerillos, Mendoza, Argentina.

Potrerillos is a district of the Luján de Cuyo Department of the province of Mendoza, Argentina. It includes a number of small settlements along Provincial Routes 82 and 89, National Route 7, and the rivers Blanco and Mendoza. The center of Potrerillos is 63 km south from Mendoza City.

Potrerillos used to be a group of farms and agricultural facilities. It then became a residential area, as well as a rest area for temporary residents, and a tourist resort.

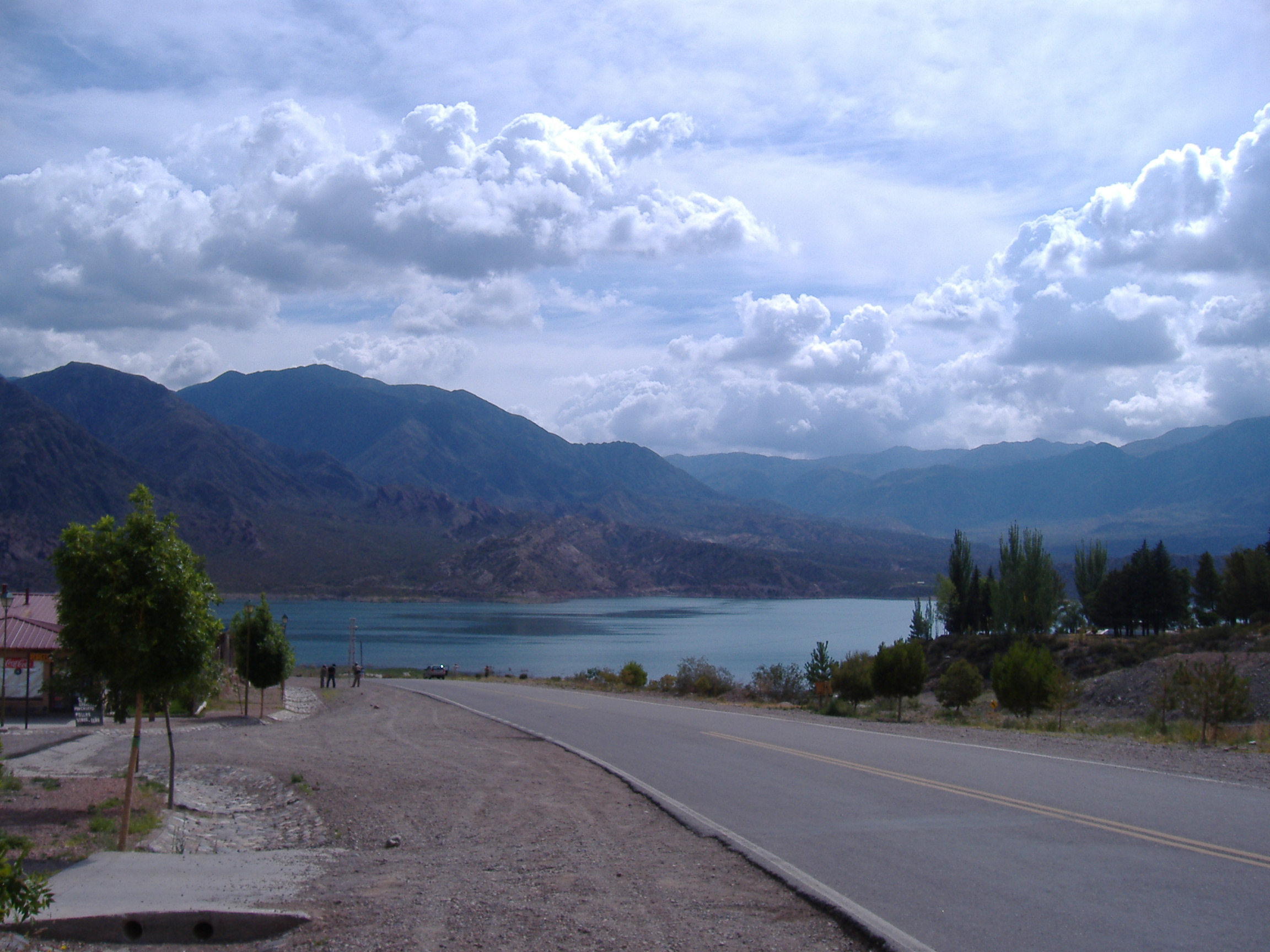
The Potrerillos reservoir

A large dam on the Mendoza River (Presa Embalse de Potrerillos) forms an artificial lake that measures 12 km in length and 3 km in maximum width. Uphill near its shore, there is a settlement of Villa Potrerillos, over 1,380 meters above mean sea level, where there is hiking (in the hills surrounding the area), rafting in the river, and paragliding.

Vallecitos, an old ski center, is located on Cordón del Plata.
