= Tercero River =

River in Argentina

Coordinates: 32°54′54″S 62°19′29″W

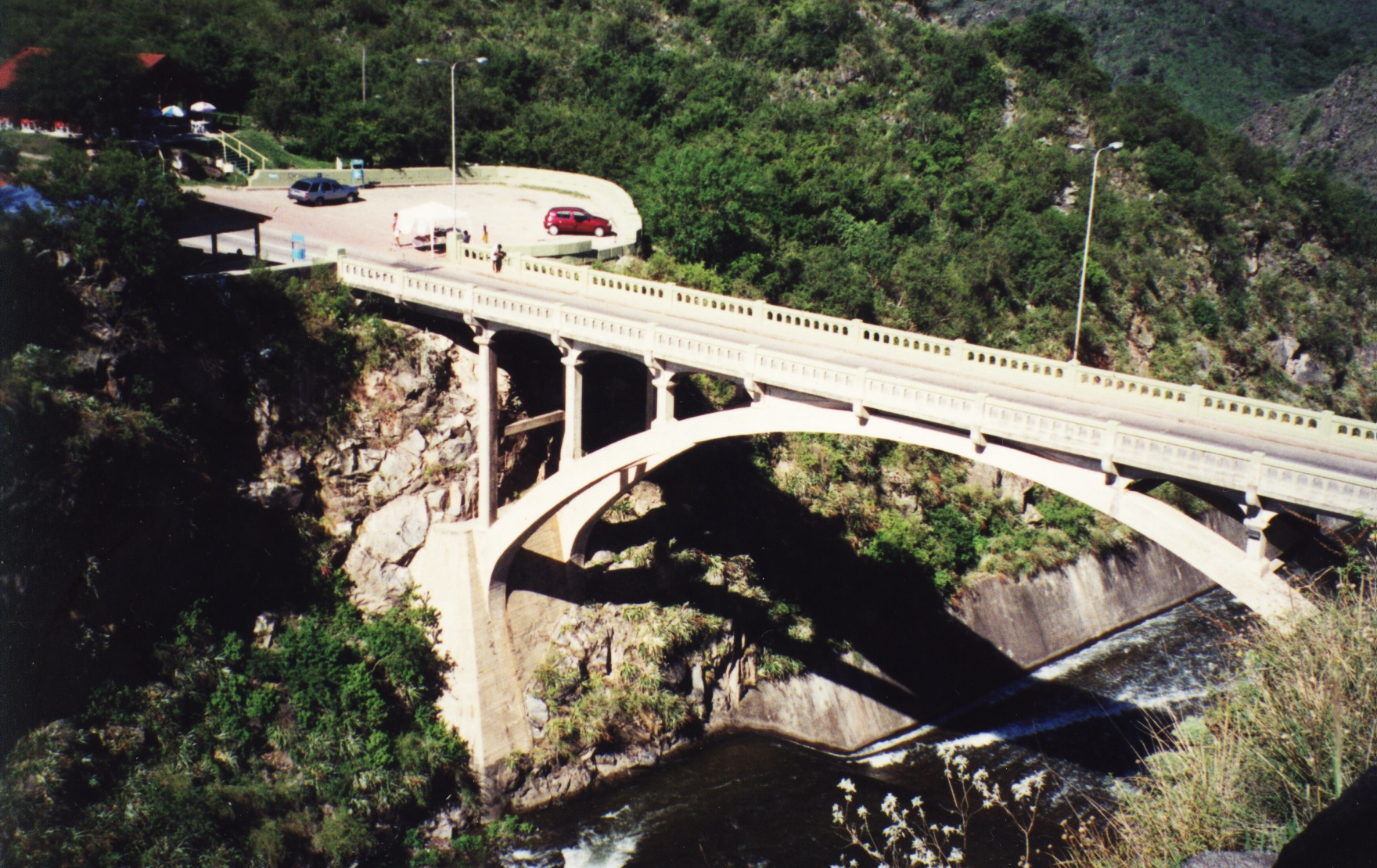
- The Provincial Route 5 bridge over the Tercero River

Location
- Argentina: Country
- Córdoba Province: Province

Physical characteristics
- Source: Sierras de Córdoba
- Mouth
  - location: Carcarañá River

Basin features
- River system: Paraná River

The Tercero River (Spanish: Río Tercero, 'Third River'), also known as Ctalamochita, is a river in Córdoba Province of Argentina.

It originates in the Sierras de Córdoba near Cerro Champaquí and Calamuchita Valley, in an area of annual precipitation of between 600 and 1,000 millimetres (24 and 39 in). Leaving the valley, it reaches the plains where four dams have been constructed, called Cerro Pelado Dam, Arroyo Corto Dam, Embalse Río Tercero — with 54.3 square kilometres (21.0 mi^{2}) built in 1936 — and Piedras Moras, which serve as flow regulators and produce hydroelectricity.

The reservoirs created by the dams are also used for tourism and recreation, including water sports and fishing.

It has a water flow of 27.17 cubic metres per second (959 cu ft/s), and flows 307 kilometres (191 mi) before reaching the Carcarañá River.

The river navigable for small- to medium-sized boats as it flows through the plains. It flows eastward into the Humid Pampas, which has an average rainfall of 730 millimetres (29 in) per year. It joins the Saladillo River (also called the Cuarto River) to form the Carcarañá River, a tributary of the Paraná River.

Among the most important cities on the path of the Tercero are Río Tercero, Villa María, Villa Nueva, Bell Ville and Leones.

The word Ctalamochita (from which the term Calamuchita derives) seems to be a mixture of the Native American term ctala or tala, meaning "important tree", and a deformation of the Spanish mucho or muchito, finally meaning "area of many trees". The name Tercero became more common since the 18th century, being the third of five rivers counting from Córdoba city. Of them, the Tercero and the Cuarto (fourth) are the only ones to reach, indirectly, the Paraná River, being therefore tributaries to the Río de la Plata Basin.

== Bridges ==
The river has the following bridges from Piedras Moras dum to the Carcarañá River:

- Piedras Moras Dum Bridge (in Almafuerte).
- 6th State Road Bridge (in Rio Tercero).
- East Bridge (in Rio Tercero).
- Los Potreros Bridge (in the countryside 32° 9'3.98"S 64° 1'38.86"O).
- West Bridge (in Villa Ascasubi).
- East Bridge (in Villa Asasubi).
- 10th State Road Bridge (in Pampayasta).
- Andinian Bridge (in Villa Maria).
- Velez Sarsfield Bridge (in Villa Maria - Villa Nueva).
- 4th State Road Bridge (in Villa Maria - Villa Nueva).
- Black Bridge (in Villa Maria - Villa Nueva).
- 2nd State Road Bridge (in Villa Nueva).
- Carcano Bridge (in Ramon J. Carcano).
- Ballesteros Bridge (in Ballesteros).
- Morrison Bridge (in Morrison).
- Paso de la Arena Pedestrian Bridge (in Bell Ville).
- Colon Bridge (in Bell Ville).
- Bus Station Pedestrian Bridge (in Bell Ville).
- Italia Bridge (in Bell Ville).
- Colombia Pedestrian Bridge (in Bell Ville).
- Falcato Pedestrian Bridge (in Bell Ville).
- Bridge of he History (in Bell Ville).
- Monte Leña Bridge (in Monte Leña).
- San Marcos West Bridge (in the countryside 32°39'32.94"S 62°31'31.22"O).
- San Marcos East Bridge (in the countryside 32°41'51.42"S 62°28'54.82"O).

== See also ==
- List of rivers of Argentina
