= Mendoza River =

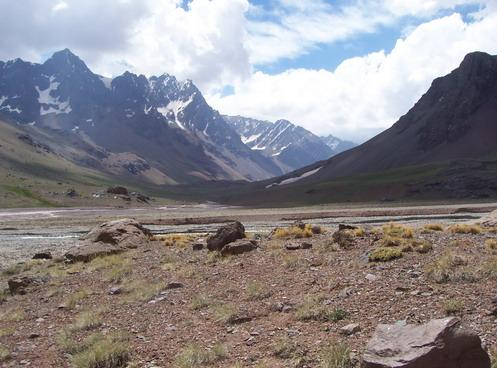
- Mendoza River

- Location of mouth

Location
- Country: Argentina

Physical characteristics
- Mouth
  - coordinates: 32.1281°S 68.2056°W

The Mendoza River is a river in the province of Mendoza, Argentina. It is formed in the Andes range between the Aconcagua and the Tupungato, by the confluence of the Vacas, the Cuevas and the Tupungato rivers, the last being its major tributary.

== Course ==
The upper valley of the Mendoza begins at around 2,600 metres (8,500 ft) above mean sea level, and it is U-shaped, of glacial origin. The river reaches Uspallata, then crosses the Precordillera through the Potrerillos Valley, flows along the Cacheuta Canyon and reaches the plain. It forms an arc and turns northeast, finally emptying into the lagunas de Guanacache, which join the San Juan River, part of the system of the Desaguadero River. (The lagunas de Guanacache are also called Bañados de Guanacache in Spanish; please note that "lagunas" does not translate as "lagoon" which is strictly a maritime term, but as "wetland", akin to "marsh" or similar.)

The river has a mean flow of 50 cubic metres per second (1,800 cu ft/s), and supplies water for the main oasis in the otherwise arid province. Its course through Potrerillos, at about 1,350 metres (4,430 ft) above sea level, features rapids, which are employed for rafting (level III–IV on the International Scale of River Difficulty during the summer). In Potrerillos the river is also dammed, forming a reservoir, which feeds a hydroelectric power station.

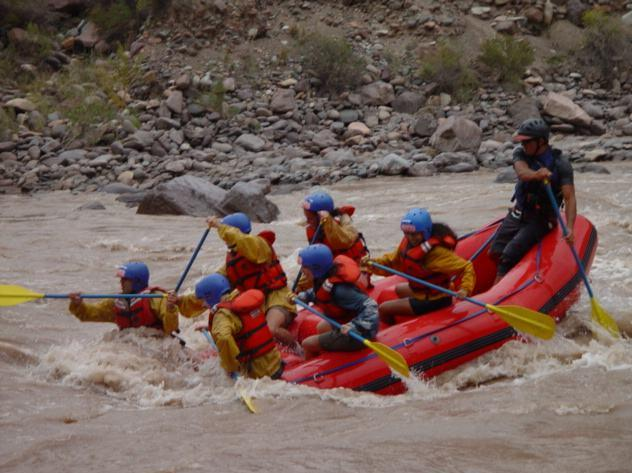
Rafting at Mendoza River

The Cacheuta Spa and the Potrerillos Dam are tourist destinations along the river.

Mendoza River irrigates the Maipú and Lujan vineyards, located in Mendoza piedmont, at 30° south latitude. This region hosts 17 percent of the Mendoza vineyards, and about 360 wineries.

== Location ==
Point	Coordinates (links to map & photo sources)	Notes
Source confluence	32.85278°S 69.75417°W	Punta de Vacas
abeam Uspallata	32.67083°S 69.36528°W	Uspallata
Potrerillos Dam	32.99444°S 69.12639°W	Potrerillos Dam
abeam Mendoza	33.04444°S 68.87917°W	Mendoza
Palmira	33.04583°S 68.57361°W	(es)
Confluence	32.12778°S 68.20556°W	San Juan River
