= José Presas y Marull =

Personal details
- Born: Catalonia, Spain
- Died: 1832 Madrid, Spain
- Occupation: Politician
- Profession: Law

José Presas y Marull (?-1842) was a Spanish attorney, writer, politician, diplomat and historian of Catalan origin. He served as the private secretary of Carlota Joaquina of Spain.

== Biography ==
José Presas was born in Sant Feliu de Guíxols (Province of Girona), son of Jerónimo Roselló y Presas and Margarita Morull. He settled in Buenos Aires near the year 1790, being a student of the College of San Carlos and probably got his doctorate in law at the University of Saint Francis Xavier. José Presas was the nephew of Francisco Marull, owner of the Botica del Colegio, a pharmacy located in front of the Church of San Ignacio.

In 1805, José Presas was arrested and then released, accused of wanting to destabilize the government of the viceroy Sobremonte. He supported the British during the invasions in the Río de la Plata, taking refuge in 1808 in Rio de Janeiro, where he was appointed secretary of the Infanta Carlota, daughter of Charles IV of Spain.

José Presas y Marull had maintained cordial relations with the American and English community, established in the Buenos Aires colonial. In 1804, he was godson of John Cook (born in Boston), baptized in the Cathedral of Buenos Aires on 8 November of the same year.
