= Los Molinos Dam =

Dam in Córdoba, Argentina

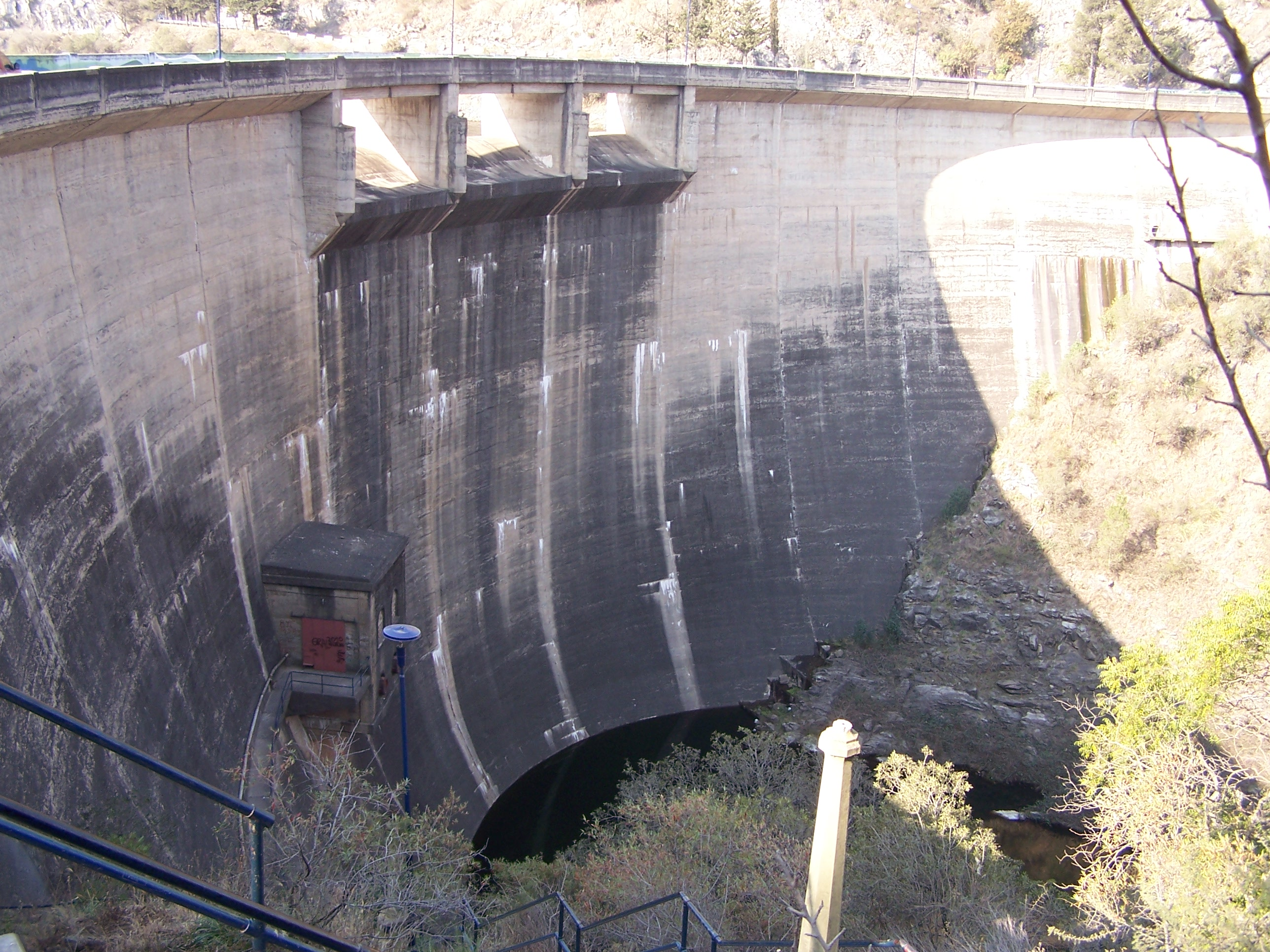
- Downstream face of the dam

- Location within Argentina
- Country: Argentina
- Location: Córdoba
- Coordinates: 31°49′6.16″S 64°30′10.78″W
- Purpose: Power, water supply, flood control
- Status: Operational
- Construction began: 1948
- Opening date: 1953; 73 years ago
- Owner: Empresa Provincial de Energia de Cordoba (EPEC)

Dam and spillways
- Type of dam: Arch
- Impounds: Los Molinos River
- Height: 60 m (200 ft)
- Length: 240 m (790 ft)

Reservoir
- Total capacity: 399×10^{6} m^{3} (323,000 acre⋅ft)
- Catchment area: 980 km^{2} (380 sq mi)
- Surface area: 24.5 km^{2} (9.5 sq mi)

Los Molinos I
- Coordinates: 31°50′17.40″S 64°26′46.81″W
- Commission date: 1956
- Turbines: 4 x 13 MW (17,000 hp) Francis-type
- Installed capacity: 52 MW (70,000 hp)

The Los Molinos Dam (in Spanish, Dique Los Molinos) is a dam over the course of the Los Molinos River in the center-west of the province of Córdoba, Argentina, about 769 metres (2,523 ft) above mean sea level.

The dam gathers the flow of a 980 square kilometres (380 sq mi) catchment basin. Its wall is 60 metres (200 ft) high and 240 metres (790 ft)long. The reservoir has a surface area of 24.5 square kilometres (9.5 sq mi) and a volume of 399 million cubic metres (323,000 acre⋅ft); the maximum depth of the water is 57 metres (187 ft).

The dam was built between 1948 and 1953, and its primary goals are the regulation of the flow of the river and the production of hydroelectricity. The power station generates 52 megawatts (70,000 hp) for the Center Region of the Argentine Interconnection System.

The reservoir is bordered by Provincial Route 5. It is employed for fishing (silverside), swimming, water skiing and sailing.
