= Dulce River (Argentina) =

Coordinates: 25°55′08″S 63°33′01″W

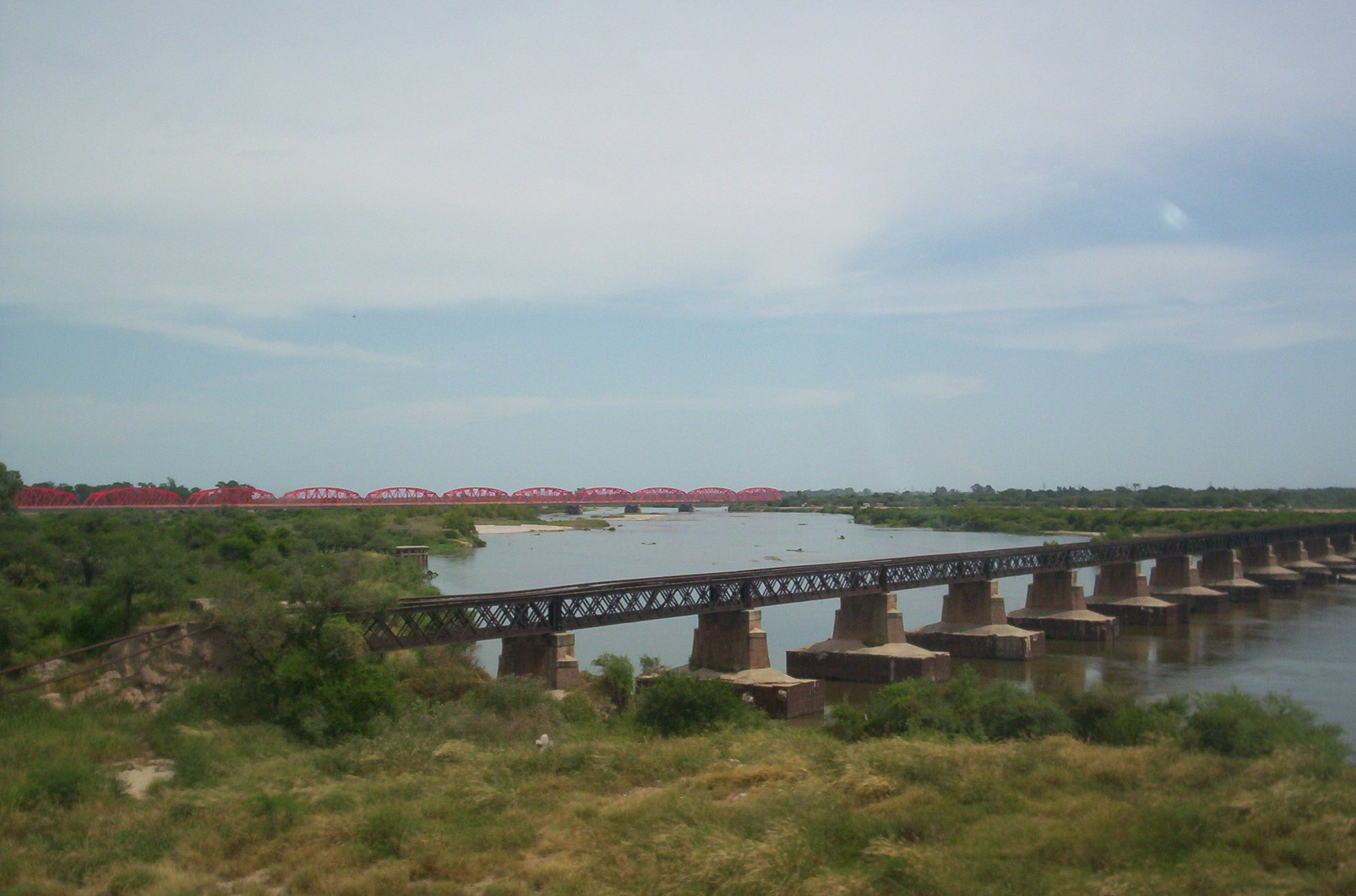
- Río Dulce ("Sweet River")

Location
- Country: Argentina

Ramsar Wetland
- Official name: Bañados del Río Dulce y Laguna de Mar Chiquita
- Designated: 28 May 2002
- Reference no.: 1176

The Dulce River (in Spanish Río Dulce, in Quechua Misky Mayu) is the most important river in the Argentine province of Santiago del Estero.

The Dulce River's source is in Tucumán Province under the name of Salí River, though it receives tributaries from Salta Province, and changes names when reaching Santiago del Estero. It runs 450 kilometres (280 mi) southeast throughout the province, and then feeds the Río Hondo in Córdoba Province before emptying into the Mar Chiquita salt lake.

There is also a dam in Tucumán Province called Río Hondo dam, with a lake formed with the connection of four rivers of Tucumán. This lake is experiencing pollution due to the lack of control of the emissions of polluting substances into the Salí River, caused mainly by the pulp mills located in Tucumán.

The river runs through the Argentine Espinal ecoregion. It is the main source of water for irrigation for the arid lands of Santiago del Estero. The Los Quiroga Dam in the northwest, finished in 1956, provides water for that area, but has produced a decrease in the precipitation of the southeastern part of the province.
