= Water resources management in Argentina =

- Withdrawals by sector 2000: Domestic: 16%; Agriculture: 74%; Industry: 10%
- Renewable water resources: 814 billion cubic meters (BCM)
- Surface water produced internally: 276 BCM
- Groundwater recharge: 128 BCM
- Overlap shared by surface water and groundwater: 128 BCM
- Renewable water resources per capita: 20,410 cubic meters per year
- Wetland designated as Ramsar sites: 19 sites; 5,318,376 ha
- Hydropower generation: 41%

Water resources management (WRM) functions in Argentina are handled by multiple institutions operating at the national, provincial, and river basin level, with a variety of functions and jurisdictions. On the national level, the National Institute for Water and the Environment (INA) and the National Water and Sanitation Utility (AySA) are charged with the duties of researching, water resources preservation, developing services, and implementing water projects.

Connectivity to water in urban settings is quite good in Argentina, but rural communities lag far behind that of less developed nations. This problem is made worse by one of the highest levels of per capita usage in the world at around 500 L/day. Large rivers and aquifers represent the main source of drinking water supplies and they are facing serious water pollution problems from industrial effluents, urbanization, and harmful agriculture practices.

Many other challenges persist throughout the country and most are regionally focused with varying degrees because Argentina is divided into many different climatic regions. Some of the critical issues are identified as an inadequate regulatory and institutional framework, inter-sectoral conflict, limited capacity in water management at the central and provincial levels, and high risk for flooding in urban and rural areas.

== Water management history and recent developments ==
Towards the end of the 19th century and throughout most of the 20th century, the Argentinean Government was the primary investor in the country's hydraulic infrastructure development. Primarily focused on developing irrigation infrastructure, the first irrigation development project started in 1909 and continued throughout the 20th century. Beginning in the early 1990s, Argentina began reforming many of its public sectors with a move to privatization of urban water services in the city of Buenos Aires. Subsequently, all the larger cities and numerous intermediate sized populations also began to incorporate private operators to improve operational efficiency and increase return on investments. This moderately recent Argentine model for management of the water supply sector still needs adjustments in the optimization of the state's regulatory function, incentive schemes, and the expansion of coverage. Even so, significant benefits have been obtained in terms of the quality of water, services rendered, a substantial increase with investments into the water sector, and improvements in the population's quality of life.

== Water management challenges ==
Significant water resources management challenges were identified by the water community of Argentina during the Second National Water Resources Meeting held in Buenos Aires (May 18–20, 2004) and are listed here: (i) incomplete/outdated legal and regulatory framework; (ii) limited capacity in water management at the central and provincial levels coupled with outdated procedures for water resources planning; (iii) lack of an integrated national water resources information system and deficient water resources monitoring network; (iv) serious water pollution problems (surface and groundwater); (v) high risk for flooding in urban and rural areas; (vi) lack of appropriate incentives for conservation and efficient use of the resource base and for reducing pollution. Some of these challenges are addressed in more detail below.

=== Water Quality ===
Water pollution from industrial effluents is a considerable challenge and the risk of continued contamination is very likely. The Government of Argentina (GoA) has a particular focus on the Matanza-Riachuelo River Basin in Buenos Aires where at least 50 industries are discharging ~95% of the total load of contaminants into the Parana river. Pollution and overuse of the aquifer in Mendoza have become a problem where agriculture and industrial runoff and mismanagement of irrigation water has deteriorated the first levels of the aquifer. This has led to over pumping and exploitation of deeper wells that reach the second and third layers of water. Older wells have been abandoned without being properly sealed posing a risk of vertical filtration (e.g. contaminated water from higher levels filters down to lower levels) into deeper water tables where farmers are pumping from. Abandoned wells also result in fields becoming stagnant and barren creating an economic loss for the region.

Problems with water quality in lakes and reservoirs in Argentina have increased due to agricultural activities, deforestation, logging, animal production, mining activities, urban run-off, and the discharge of untreated sewage. As a result of these activities, many lakes and reservoirs are receiving high quantities of nutrients and are suffering from eutrophication. The increasing occurrence of algal blooms is the evidence of this growing occurrence. Algal blooms occur especially in reservoirs and ponds, and are spread over at least twelve provinces of Argentina. Specifically, fifteen aquatic environments were identified at high risk of poisoning by eutrophication.

Water pollution typically occurs due to the discharge of effluent into water systems, improper landfill techniques, flooding of urban areas resulting in pollution from urban run-off, and agricultural practices. For example, the cities La Rioja and Catamarca have constraints on expansion of freshwater supplies forcing the residents to use only water they have available even if it is contaminated. The lack of piped water and sewage can exacerbate the water pollution problem through excessive contamination from excrements. For example, communities having 5,000-10,000 residents and urban centers with 200,000-500,000 residents have 90% and 60% of those respective residents that lack connection to sewers.

=== Lack of good management ===
Mismanagement of water in the Puelches aquifer of Buenos Aires is a real problem. During the 1980s, this aquifer was over-exploited resulting in saline intrusion from the Atlantic Ocean causing the city to use water from the Plata river. Over time, the Puelches aquifer has recharged but is not being used and now the water level of the aquifer is reaching 1 m below the surface in many areas. This inverse phenomenon has resulted in waterlogged basements and storage units, flooded tunnels, the weakening of foundations, and the saturation of household septic tanks. In Córdoba, urbanization and the lack of proper treatment facilities around the San Roque Lake, caused an alarming increase in cyanobacteria and thrihalomethanes have been detected in treatment plants at above-normal levels. This lake is the cities main source of drinking water, and is at continued risk of elevated levels of nitrogen and phosphorus and further outbreaks.

=== Flooding and stormwater ===
Flooding is the major natural hazard in Argentina. According to 1998 statistics of Swiss-Re, Argentina ranks 18th in the world in potential flood losses, in excess of US$3 billion in 1998. In Buenos Aires, flooding occurs on average about twice per year and 1.4 million individuals are at risk of floods. These floods are due to the condition of the drainage network, and strong winds from the southeast, (sudestadas), which produce a rise of the Rio de la Plata high above its average.

To reduce the impact of floods and droughts on the economy and to help development in the region, in 2021, Argentina signed a flood protection loan agreement with the European Investment Bank. The $110 million EIB loan will assist integrated water resource management in the Salado River Basin in Buenos Aires over a 25-year period. The World Bank has agreed to co-finance the project with a $111.6 million loan.

=== Institutional challenges ===
Water resources management functions are handled by multiple institutions operating at the national, provincial, and river basin level, with a variety of functions and jurisdictions. This has given rise to inter-sectoral and inter-jurisdictional conflicts (particularly between competing uses such as irrigation, hydropower and environment), poor planning and budget programming, and limited technical capacity and knowledge exchange.

== Water resource base ==
=== Surface and groundwater resources ===
Annual rainfall averages ~600 mm which equates to 1,668 km^{3}; however, about 83% of this precipitation is lost through evapotranspiration and evaporation. Subsequently, internal renewable water resources are reduced to about 276 km^{3}. Runoff is also significant and is estimated at 814 km^{3}/year, of which 538 km^{3} comes from contributions originating in basins from Paraguay and Uruguay. These statistics are general for the entire country; however, Argentina is a large country encompassing 2.7 million km^{2} with weather patterns and climates that vary greatly. For example, the eastern edges of the Andes mountains are dry and water scarcity and droughts are an ongoing issue. In the greater Buenos Aires which is a lowland area, water pollution from industrial effluents, stormwater and flooding, and groundwater management are the major concerns. Down in the sparsely populated Patagonia region where there is ample quantities of high quality water, water resources management has fewer challenges.

Major rivers of Argentina: Important rivers of Argentina in terms of length and quantity of water conveyed and discharged include the Parana, Uruguay, and the Negro rivers. The two largest rivers, the Paraná River and the Uruguay River originate in Brazil. The Uruguay River runs north to south and forms a border with Argentina, Brazil, and Uruguay. The Parana River together with the Uruguay river form the Río de la Plata estuary. Only a few of the Argentine rivers such as the Futaleufú River flow to the Pacific, while the majority of rivers originate on eastern slopes of the Andes and run towards the Atlantic Ocean. Argentina is home to at least three major endorheic basins or closed water drainage basins e.g. water does not flow to the ocean. Both the northwest and southwest pampas basins in the dry pampas areas of Argentina and the Meseta Somuncura in the Patagonia region of Argentina are endorheic basins. Notable river basins under this classification include the Desaguadero River basin which has great hydroelectric and irrigation significance. In times of great precipitation, its waters can actually reach the sea. The Desaguadero River basin includes the following tributaries: Jáchal, Mendoza, Tunuyán, Diamante and Atuel.

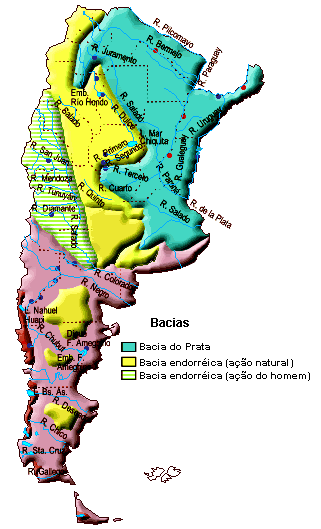
Argentina hydrographic map

Name	Length (km)	Discharge ( m^{3}/s)
Paraná River	1,800	16,806
Uruguay River	1,500	5,026
Negro River	635	865
Bermejo River	1,000	339
Pilcomayo River	850	152
Colorado River	860	134
Salado River (Buenos Aires)	700	88
San Juan River	500	56
Mendoza River	400	50
Chubut River	810	48
Salado del Norte River	2,000	15
Desaguadero River	1,200	14
Deseado River	615	5

=== Storage capacity ===
Total capacity of reservoirs in Argentina is estimated by the Food and Agriculture Organization (FAO) at around 186 km^{3}. Of this quantity, 96% of total capacity is stored behind large dams. Of note, one of the largest reservoirs at approximately 1600 km^{2} is stored behind the Yacyretá dam and is located on the Parana river bordering Paraguay is used primarily for hydroelectric generation in Argentina.

The following is a list of Lakes in Argentina.

- Alumine Lake
- Amutui Quimei Lake
- Argentino Lake
- Espejo Lake
- Correntoso Lake
- Futalafquen Lake
- Gutiérrez Lake
- Huechulafquen Lake
- Lácar Lake
- Laguna del Diamante
- Laguna Mar Chiquita
- Mascardi Lake
- Nahuel Huapi Lake
- Puelo Lake
- Quillén Lake
- Tromén Lake

Key Characteristics of the major Drainage Basins

Drainage Basin	River Basin	Principal watersheds	Drainage Surface km^{2}	Average annual run off (BCM/year) (1)	Flow (L/s km^{2})
Atlantic	Paraná, Paraguay, Uruguay	Paraná, Iguazú, Santa Lucía, Corrientes, Guayquiraró, Feliciano, Gualeguay, Arrecifes, Paraguay, Pilcomayo, Bermejo, Uruguay, Pepirí-Guazú, Aguapey, Mirinay, Mocoretá, Gualeguaychú	3,092,000	694,770	7.1
Atlantic	Río de la Plata and the Buenos Aires province until the Colorado River	Plata River, Salado	181,203	4,636	0.8
Atlantic	Colorado	Colorado, Vinchina, Jáchal, San Juan, Mendoza, Riodesaguadero, Tunuyán, Diamante, Atuel	92,840	10,060	3.4
Atlantic	Patagonia Rivers	Neuguén, Limay, Negro, Chubut, Senguerr y Chico	356,033	61,211	5.5
Pacific	Rivers contributing to the Pacific	Hua-Hum, Manso y Puelo, Futaleufú, Carrenleufú y Pico, Simpson River, Pueyrredón, Mayer, Vizcachas, Fagnano	33,455	38,222	36.2
Closed Watersheds (water cannot leave and so accumulates)	Mar Chiquita, Región Serrana, Pampeana y Salares	N/A	258,096	5,866	0.6
Total	--	--	4,053,587	814,765	53.6

Source: FAO

== Water resources management by sector ==
=== Water coverage and usage ===
Excerpts and table below drawn from:

The water coverage situation in Argentina is generally viewed as unacceptable because per capita income in the country is the highest in Latin America. While Argentina has achieved very high levels of access to an improved water source in urban areas (98%), access in rural areas remains relatively low for a country of Argentina's level of development (80% using a broad definition, 45% for house connections) In general, rural citizens receive deficient service compared to poorer countries.

Circumstances are exacerbated by irrational consumption and waste in most of Argentina's systems. Much of the waste is caused in large part by inadequate fees that do not accurately represent the value of water. The most evident indicator of over-consumption and waste is the average municipal use of nearly 500 liters/person/day or about 182 m^{3} per year ranking Argentina near the top, along with Costa Rica, of municipal water use in Latin America. Total water use including industrial, agriculture, and municipal is 774 m^{3} per person or about 4% of total annual renewable water resources on a per capita basis.

		Urban (90% of the population)	Rural (10% of the population)	Total
Water	Broad definition	98%	80%	96%
Water	House connections	83%	45%	79%
Sanitation	Broad definition	92%	83%	91%
Sanitation	Sewerage	48%	5%	44%

Source: Joint Monitoring Program WHO/UNICEF(JMP /2006).

=== Irrigation ===
Argentina has a long history with irrigation needs and usage. In 1909, the National Government enacted the National Law of irrigation number 6546 that prompted the creation of a large number of hydraulic works projects and the creation of new irrigation systems throughout Argentina. Decades later, the introduction of pumping equipment on the national market in the 1950s spurned changes in the irrigation landscape. Advances in irrigation equipment led to an increase in irrigated surface area while ushering in a systematization of farming procedures such as; i) application of water, ii) preparation of land and soil, iii) gained efficiencies, iv) diversification of crops, v) and the introduction of spraying and localized irrigation techniques. This was all mostly due to the higher cost of water and the need to recover investments made by crop production while seeking higher profitability.

The evolution of irrigation in Argentina has been discontinuous over recent decades. According to data compiled by the National Directorate of Water Resources in Argentina, estimated total coverage in 1970 was about 1 million ha and only increased to approximately 1.2 million by 1988, and then up again to 2.1 million by 1995. This figure for irrigated surface area in 1995 represented almost 8% of the total cultivated area in the country. Actual potential for irrigated land is much higher at around 6.1 million ha if soil qualities and water resources are taken into account. Around 44% of the potential irrigated land is located in arid regions and 56% in located in more humid areas of the country. Water resources are the limiting factor in scaled development in the irrigation sector in Argentina. It has been estimated that as much as 95 million ha in Argentina have good soil but not enough water.

=== Stormwater drainage ===
One of the most important sector-related issues affecting Argentina is the high cost related to the recurring flooding of highly urbanized and important metropolitan areas throughout the country. The magnitude of these flood-incurred costs ranks Argentina 1st in Latin America and 14th worldwide. Although flooding affects the entire country, flood and drainage concerns are more prevalent in four main geographic regions: i) Buenos Aires and the surrounding municipalities because its high level of urbanization (12.6 million inhabitants or 42% of total population), its economic importance, and its location on a flat and low-lying area; ii) urban centers within the Parana basin, a subtropical region with high annual rainfalls that often coincide with high river elevations; iii) Andes foothill provinces (Cuyo and Northwestern provinces) with their intense, short-lived rains and rapid snowmelts that produce flashfloods; iv) rainfalls of high intensity over limited area that are responsible for floods in Patagonia and the southern provinces.

=== Hydropower ===
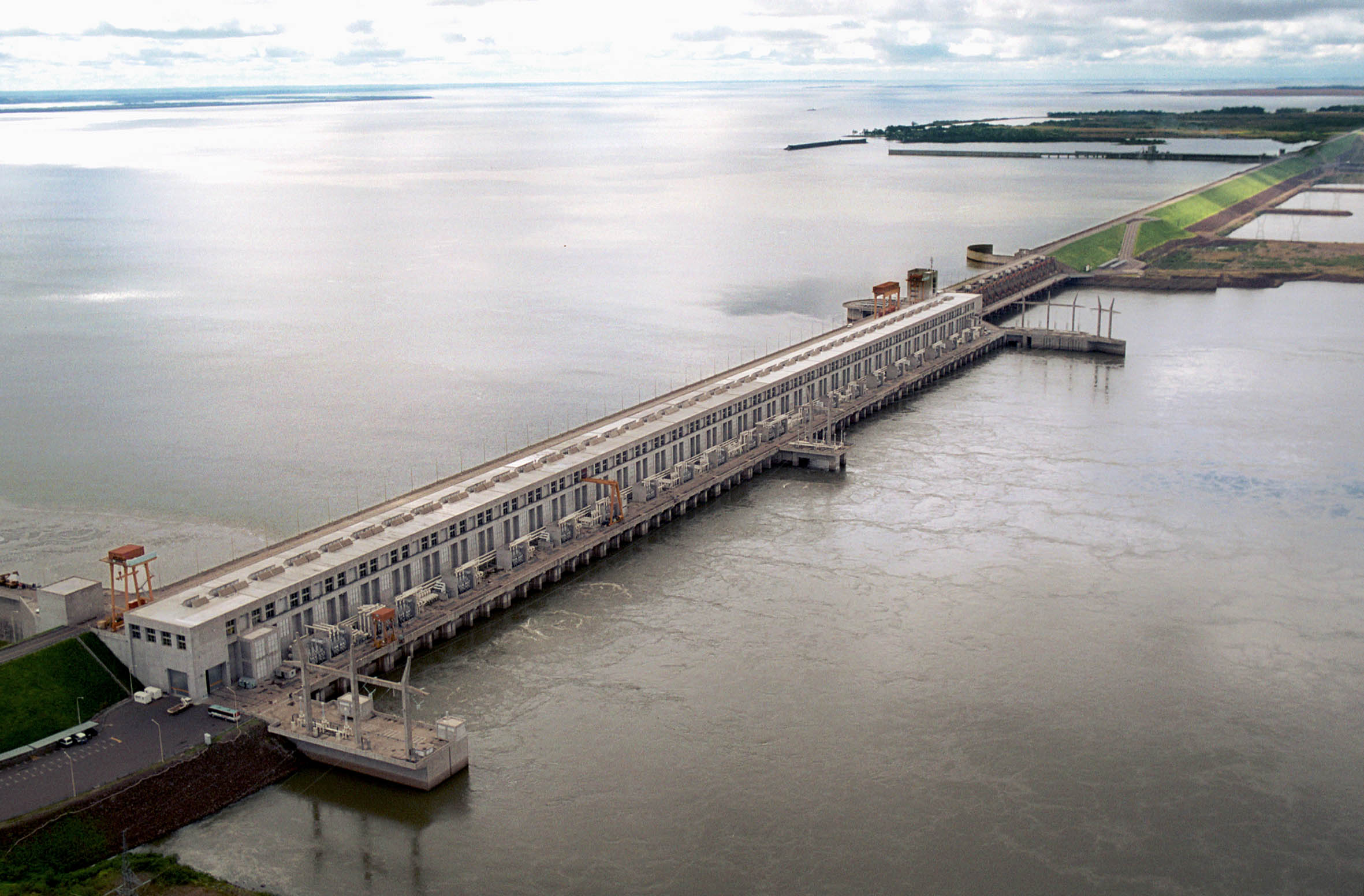
The Yacyretá Hydroelectric facility on the Parana River.

Theoretically, hydroelectricity potential in Argentina has been estimated at 169,000 GWh per year while the feasible potential is closer to 130,000 GWh per year. Total installed hydro capacity is around 10,000 MW across 35 locations throughout the country. The average annual power generation in Argentina is 32,000 GWh per year representing about 25% of the feasible potential. Large bi-national hydro projects such as the Yacyretá and the Salto Grande substantially increase Argentina's total power generation.

During the early 1990s, Argentina began a thorough reform of its public sector, which included the restructuring and privatization of the electricity sector. Hydropower plants were no exception as the primary hydroelectric plants were grouped into "business units". These units are national concessions with one to three power plants in each group. Notable exceptions to the privatization scheme because they are bi-national are again the Yacyretá and the Salto Grande power plants. Additionally, there were at least six hydroelectric power plants as of 2005 in the planning stages with a total power generation capacity of approximately 10,000 GHw per year.

List of Dams in Argentina

Dam	Basin	Storage capacity	Principal function	Installed generation capacity (If hydroelectric)	Year of Inauguration
Alicurá Dam	Chubut	3.3 BCM	Hydroelectricity	1000 MW	1985
Arroyito Dam	Chubut	0.3 BCM	Hydroelectricity	120 MW	1979
El Carrizal Dam	Desaguadero	237 million m3	regulate flow	17 MW	1971
Planicie Banderita hydroelectric power plant	Cerros Colorados		Hydroelectricity	596 MW	1978
El Chocón Dam	Chubut	20.15 BCM	Regulate flow, irrigation, Hydroelectricity	1,200 MW	1973
El Cajón Dam		8 million m^{3}	regulate flow		1993
Ingeniero Ballester Dam	Chubut		Regulate flow, irrigation		
Los Molinos Dam		399 million m^{3}	Regulate flow, Hydroelectricity	148 MW	1953
Los Quiroga Dam			Hydroelectricity		1956
Pichi Picún Leufú Dam	Chubut	197 million m^{3}	Regulate flow, Hydroelectricity	261MW	2000
Piedra del Águila Dam	Chubut	11.2 BCM	Regulate flow, Hydroelectricity		1993
Ullum Dam		440 million m^{3}	Regulate Flow, irrigation, Hydroelectricity	41 MW	
Los Reyunos Dam			Hydroelectricity		
Salto Grande Dam			Hydroelectricity	1,890 MW	1979
Yacyretá Dam	La Plata		Hydroelectricity	4,050 MW	1993

== Legal and institutional framework ==
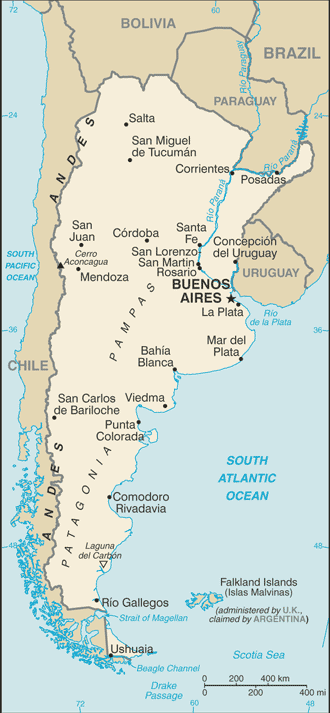
A map of Argentina

=== Legal framework ===
Argentina's federal structure is based on the duties assigned in article 121 of the National Constitution. According to article 121, the provinces hold power not already delegated to the Federal Government by this Constitution. The 1994 constitutional reform added article 124 of the charter and expressly stated that "provinces have original ownership of natural resources existing in their territory." The national Congress has the authority, through the Civil Code, to establish the following essential principles regarding the legal condition of waters: i) public ownership of surface and ground water as stated in Article 2340); and ii) the principle of special concession for water use as stated in articles 2341, 2342, and 2642. In addition to the Civil Code, Argentine Water Law includes commercial law, mining codes, federal laws on energy, navigation, transportation, ports system, jurisdiction over Argentine waters, Interprovincial Commerce, and toxic waste regulation. All of these regulations directly or indirectly contain provisions regarding water resources.

The Electricity Regulatory Framework Law (N°24,065/92) created the National Electricity Regulatory Commission (ENRE) as an independent body that works within the scope of the Secretariat of State for Energy. ENRE was commissioned through Decree 570 in 1996 by the Secretariat of State for Energy to administer hydroelectric concession contracts.

=== Institutional framework ===
Various actions and measures have been developed in the country to institutionalize policy preparation and water resources administration at the national level. One of these was the creation in 1991 of the Secretariat of Natural Resources and Environment, whose name later changed in 1996 to the Secretariat of Natural Resources and Sustainable Development, overseen by the office of the President. The Under-Secretariat of Water Resources oversees the National Bureau of Water Policy, which is in charge of planning and executing national water policy, supervising compliance and coordinating plans, programs and projects related to water resources, and the National Bureau of Water Resources Administration, which is essentially responsible for proposing and executing policies, programs and projects related to public water works.

- INA (El Instituto Nacional del Agua (INA)) is the National Institute for Water and the Environment, whose objective is to meet the requirements of studying, researching, developing and providing specialized services in the field of water and environmental development, control and preservation, aimed at implementing and developing a national environmental policy. INA continues the tasks begun in 1973 by the National Institute of Water Science and Technology (INCYTH), whose functions and powers have been expanded, incorporating environmental variables into the water resources study.
- AySA (Agua y Saneamiento Argentinos S.A.) is the National Water and Sanitation utility of Argentina and works with ACUMAR on implementation of water projects within their concessions of Buenos Aires.
- SAyDS (Secretaría de Ambiente y Desarrollo Sostenible) is the Secretariat of the Environment and Sustainable Development.

== International agreements ==
With Chile In 1991, an environmental treaty between Chile and Argentina was signed and within the treaty there is a "Protocolo de acuerdo" or framework agreement regarding shared water resources between the two countries. The framework agreement seeks to regulate the 'non-transfer" of pollution through waterways (rivers, aquifers, lakes, pipes) from one country to the other. This agreement, while it has not yet become effective is still considered by the FAO to be a global framework on negotiating this kind of agreement. In May 2009, representatives from Argentina and Chile met to formalize a request to their respective Ministers of Foreign Affairs. The request asks that the objectives of the 1991 protocol of shared water resources be complied with. Objectives in Article I of the protocol state, "the parties shall agree that the actions and programs concerning the use of shared water resources be undertaken under the concept of integrated management of the watersheds."

La Plata River Basin is shared by Argentina, Uruguay, Brazil, and Paraguay have a framework for the sustainable management of Its water resources with respect to the hydrological effects of climatic variability and change. The "FREPLATA" project implemented between the countries aims to ensure the sustainable management of the exceptional biota of the la Plata River and its waterfronts with Argentina and Uruguay. Another component of this is the Guaraní aquifer system project which promotes the protection of one of the largest semi-confined aquifers in the world that is shared amongst Argentina, Brazil, Paraguay and Uruguay.

The Guarani aquifer is shared also between Argentina, Uruguay, Brazil, and Paraguay and constitutes one of the largest reservoirs of groundwater in the world. Current water storage is approximately 37.000 km^{3} and the aquifer has a natural recharge of 166 km^{3} per year. The Environmental Protection and Sustainable Development of the Guarani Aquifer System Project was developed to support the four countries to elaborate and implement a shared institutional, legal and technical framework to preserve and manage the Guarani Aquifer and was executed between 2003 and 2007. Total project cost is US$26.7 million. The General Secretariat executed the project components in coordination with the four national agencies charged with executing the components. External support was provided by the Global Environment Facility (GEF), the World Bank (WB), the Organization of American States (OAS), the Netherlands and German Governments and the International Atomic Energy Agency.

== Multi-lateral external assistance ==
The World Bank: The World Bank is engaged with the Government of Argentina (GoA) in a US$840 million multi-phase project with the following objectives (i) improve sewerage services in the MR River Basin and other parts of the Province and City of Buenos Aires by expanding transport and treatment capacity; (ii) support a reduction of industrial discharges to the MR River, through the provision of industrial conversion grants to small and medium enterprises; (iii) promote improved decision-making for environmentally sustainable land use and drainage planning, and to pilot urban drainage and land use investments, in the M-R River Basin; and (iv) strengthen ACUMAR's institutional framework for ongoing and sustainable clean-up of the MR River Basin.

The World Bank's Urban Flood Prevention and Drainage Project will help reduce the vulnerability of Argentina to flooding, through a mix of structural and non-structural measures. The project consists of the following components: Component 1) aims at providing provincial institutions with flood risk management instruments that can assist with the implementation of specific institutional development activities. Component 2) will provide housing in safe areas for those families that may be resettled from the lands required for the works and for lower income families living in flood prone areas in their immediate proximity. Component 3) will finance works to protect important urban areas against flood effects. It will contain minor rehabilitation of existing schemes and would include fortification of flood defenses in geographic areas with strong economic activity and the greatest vulnerability to serious repeated flood damage. Component 4) Technical assistance would be provided for US$2.39 million (or 3.4 percent of project loan) to help implement the project.

The Inter-American Development Bank: In the mid-1990s, the government completed a comprehensive MR Environmental Management Plan (EMP) and received a US$250 million Inter-American Development Bank (IDB) loan to help finance implementation of the EMP objectives. Twelve years after the beginning of the project, the IDB only disbursed US$10 million, and is only now committing another US$90 million for urgent clean-up activities (the remaining balance having been long ago reallocated). The Government of Argentina (GoA) concluded that the lack of an adequate institutional and legal framework to coordinate the involvement of different government jurisdictions has been a major obstacle to implementing the EMP.

== Ramsar sites in Argentina ==
There are many wetlands of Argentina that provide a range of functions. Wetlands are key areas for drinking water, sanitation, agriculture and food, absorbing large water flows after heavy rainfall and glacial melt, and for providing water in periods of droughts. The Ramsar Convention on Wetlands came into force in Argentina on September 4, 1992. and there 19 sites designated as Wetlands of International Importance, with total surface area of 5,318,376 hectares (13 million acres).

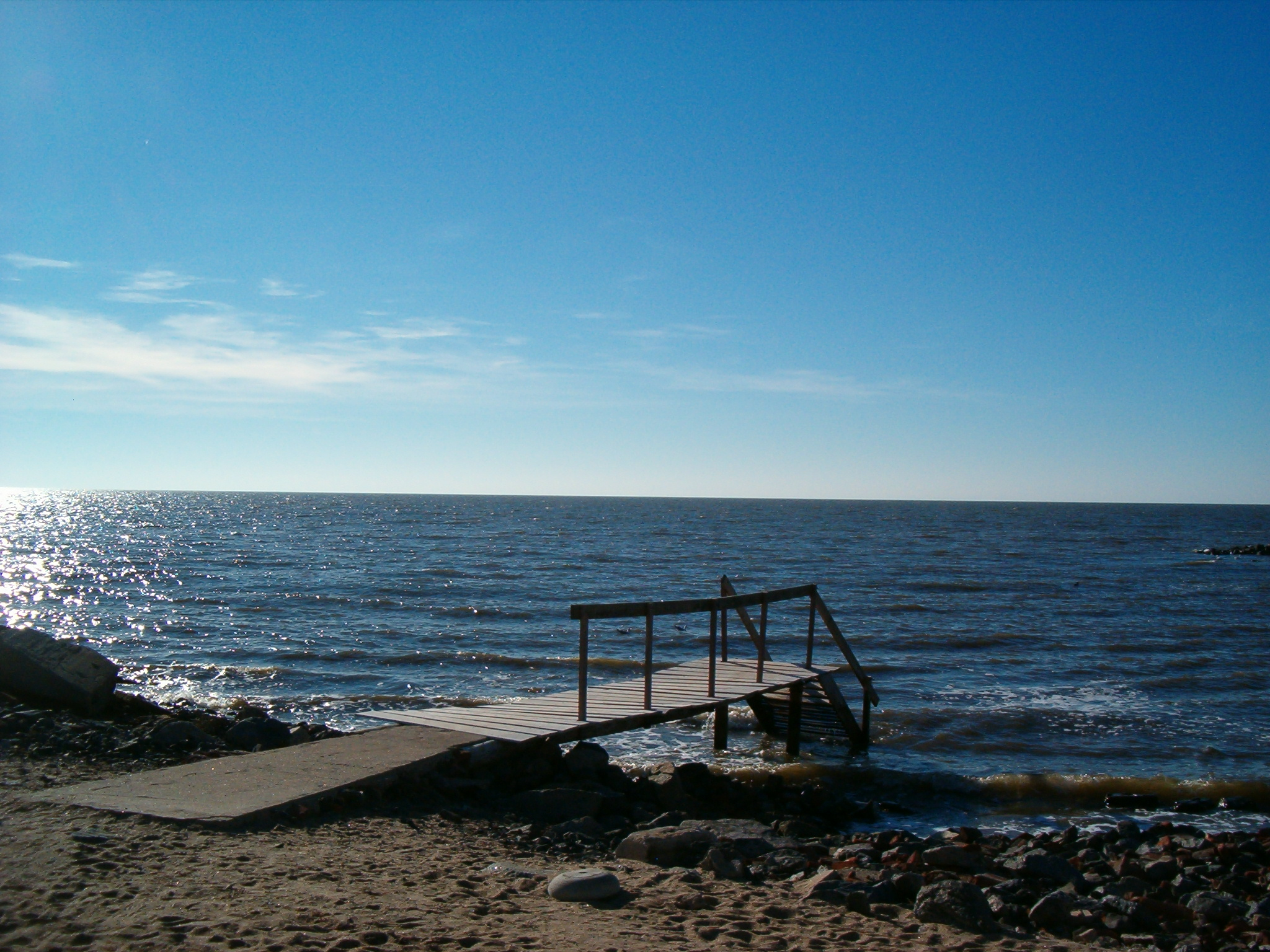
Ramsar site: Mar Chiquita (the "little sea").

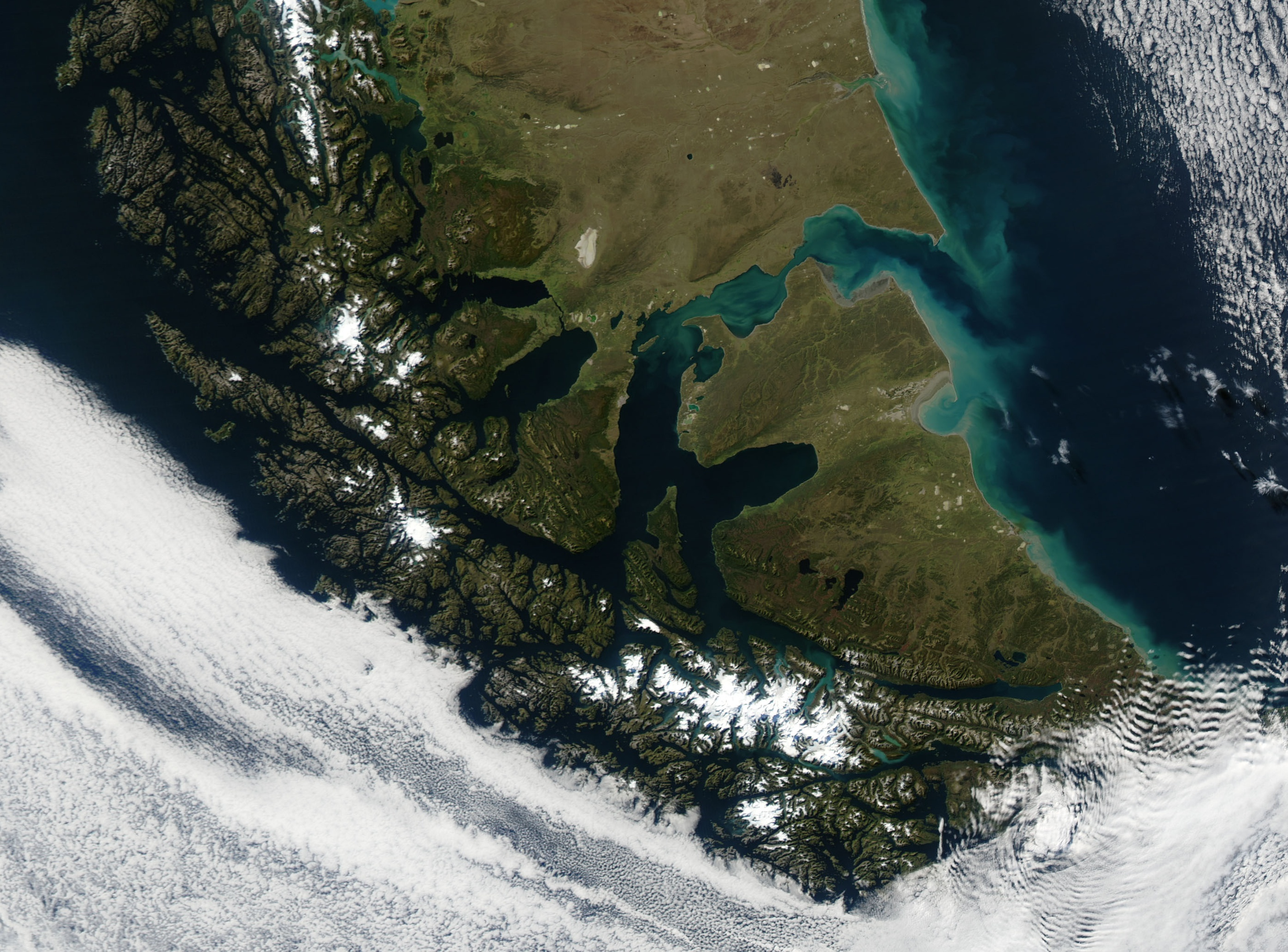
Satellite image of Tierra del Fuego

List of Ramsar Sites:

- Bahía de Samborombón
- Bañados del Río Dulce y Laguna de Mar Chiquita
- Glaciar Vinciguerra y turberas asociadas
- Humedal Laguna Melincué
- Humedales Chaco
- Jaaukanigás
- Laguna Blanca
- Laguna de Llancanelo MR
- Laguna de los Pozuelos
- Lagunas Altoandinas y Puneñas de Catamarca
- Lagunas de Guanacache, Desaguadero y del Bebedero
- Lagunas de Vilama
- Lagunas y Esteros del Iberá
- Parque Provincial El Tromen
- Reserva Costa Atlantica de Tierra del Fuego
- Reserva Ecológica Costanera Sur
- Reserva Natural Otamendi
- Reserva Provincial Laguna Brava
- Río Pilcomayo

== Potential climate change impacts ==
According to the Intergovernmental Panel on Climate Change Fourth Assessment report from 2007, Argentina will be impacted by climate change with differing affects depending on the region of Argentina in question. A declining trend in precipitation may be observed in south-west Argentina while expected increases in sea-level rise (SLR), extreme weather and climatic variability are very likely to affect coastal areas of the Buenos Aires Province in Argentina. Stress on water availability and quality has been documented where lower precipitation and/or higher temperatures occur. For example, droughts related to La Niña create severe restrictions for water supply and irrigation demands in central western Argentina. Additionally, glaciers in Latin America have receded dramatically in the past decades, and many of them have disappeared completely. IPCC predicts this trend to continue and perhaps even worsen. The most affected sub-regions are the Peruvian Andes, southern Chile and Argentina up to latitude 25°S. In an article from Science Daily in March 2008, the news agency reports that, "if the inter-tropical glaciers of Chile, Argentina, and Colombia disappear, water availability and hydropower generation will be affected."

== See also ==
- Integrated urban water management in Buenos Aires, Argentina
- Water supply and sanitation in Argentina
- Electricity sector in Argentina
