= Piedra del Águila =

- City and Municipality
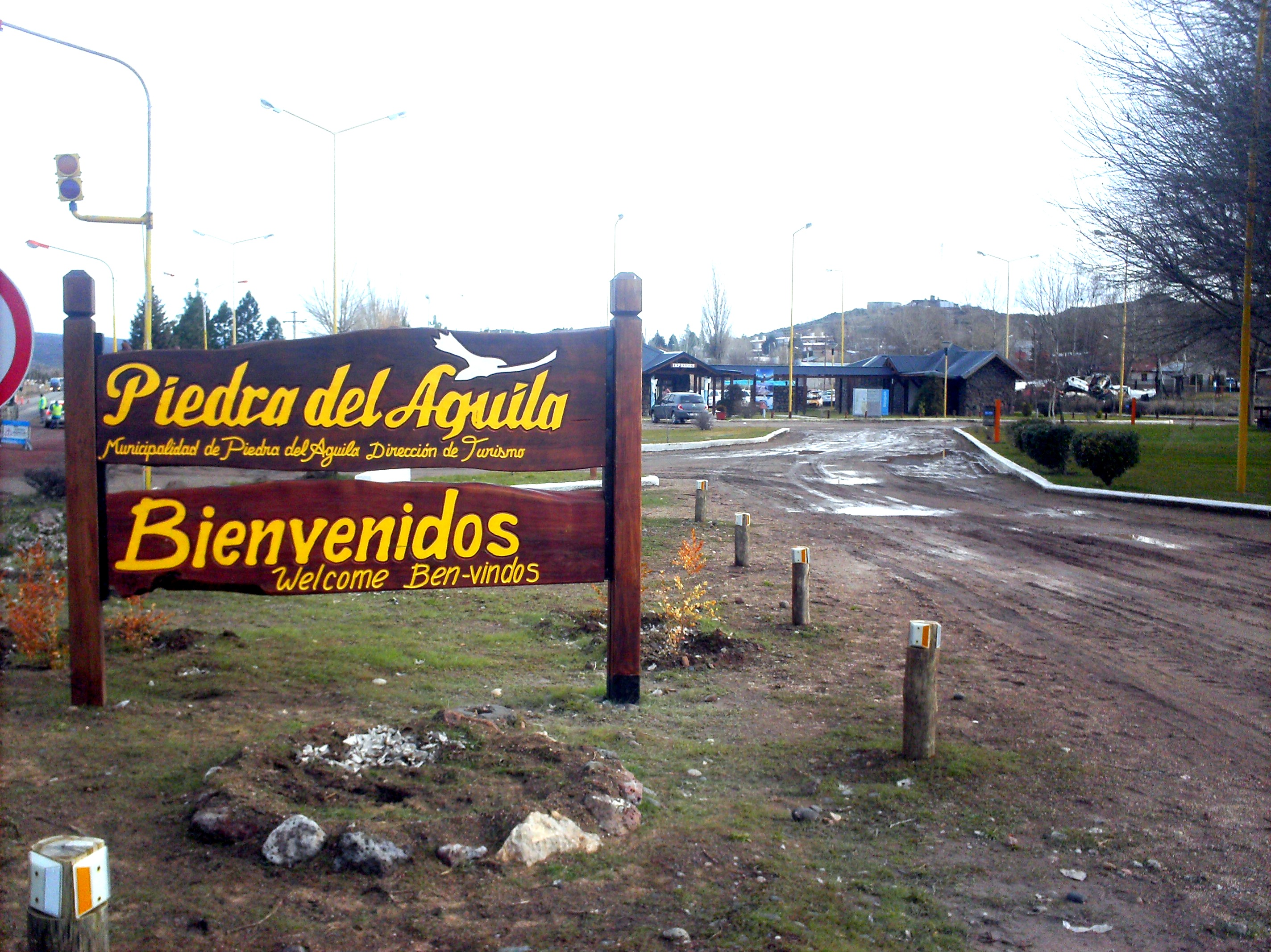
- Hola piedra

- Location within Neuquén Province Location within Argentina
- Coordinates: 40°02′S 70°04′W
- Country: Argentina
- Province: Neuquén
- Department: Collón Curá Department
- Founded: April 8, 1897

Government
  - Mayor: Adolfo Paine
- Elevation: 491 m (1,611 ft)

Population (2010 census [INDEC])
  - Total: 3,689
- Time zone: UTC−3 (ART)
- CPA Base: Q 8315
- Area code: +54 02942
- Website: Csb

Piedra del Águila (English: Stone of the Eagle) is a second category Municipality and the capital city of Collón Curá Department, located in Neuquén Province, Argentina.

== Geography ==
Piedra del Águila is located 211 km from Neuquén, the capital city of the province. The town is located near the Limay River, in a chain of hills preceded by a mesa area and a small Mountain range with lakes and stone formations. The vegetation is characterized by small bushes, mostly Juncus.

== Economy ==
=== Tourism ===
The major touristic attraction in Piedra del Águila is the fishing in the Limay River, in this track of the river the most common species of fish are the brown trout, the perch and the rainbow trout.

Piedra del Águila welcomed a musical road in 2021 to increase tourism, as well as make driving safer in the area. A small stretch of road among national route 237 plays the first ten notes of "La Cucaracha" when going on the side of the road.

=== Power Sources ===
Due to the powerful stream of the Limay river in the zone there are two important electricity dams in the area, the Pichi Picún Leufú Dam and the Piedra del Águila Dam both provide some towns in the province including Piedra del Águila and some towns in Rio Negro Province.

== Culture ==
According to the historian Gregorio Alvarez, the town was named Piedra del Águila due to the fact that in the zone, eagles used to establish nests.
