= General López Department =

- Department
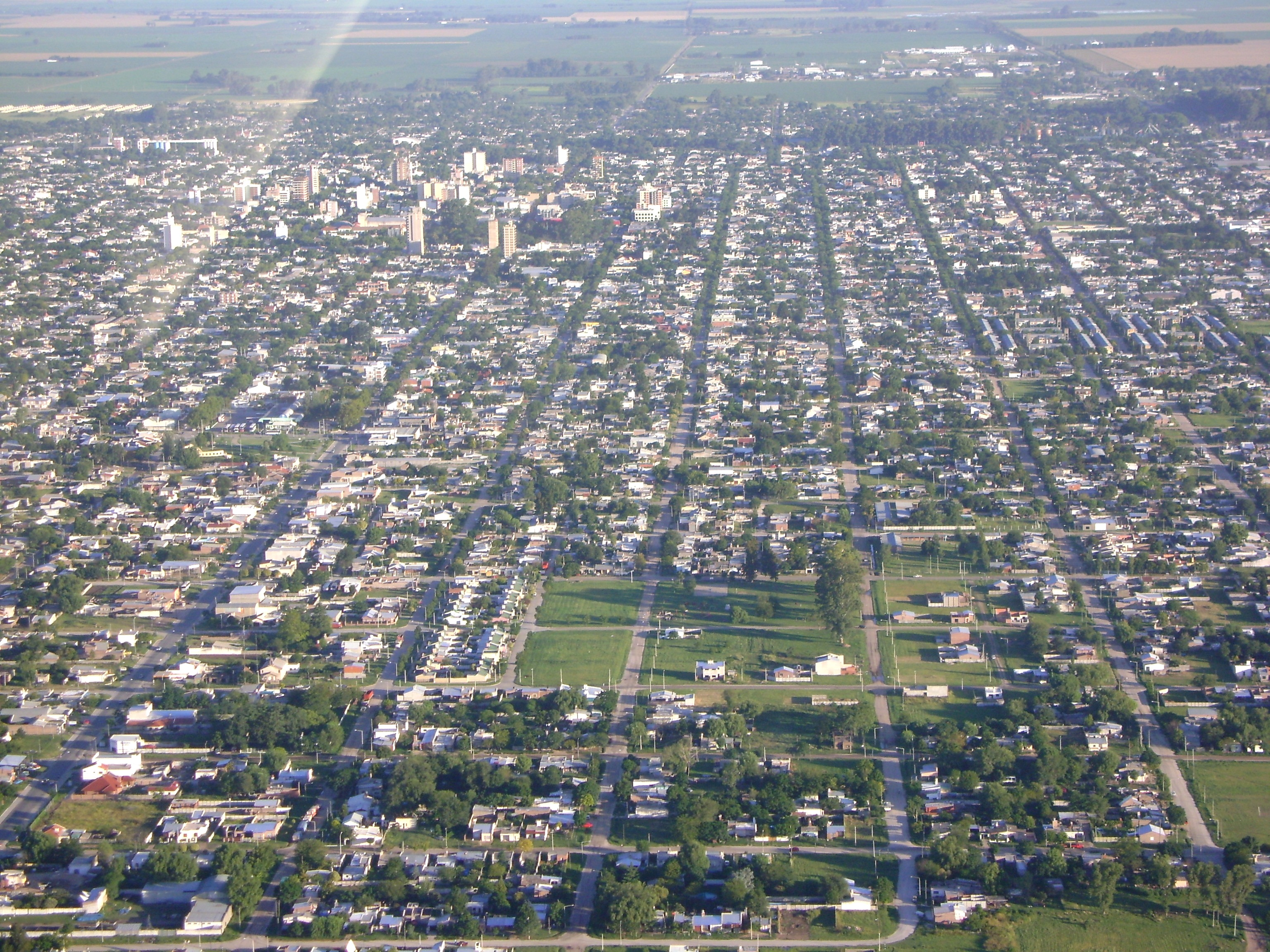
- Venado Tuerto from the air

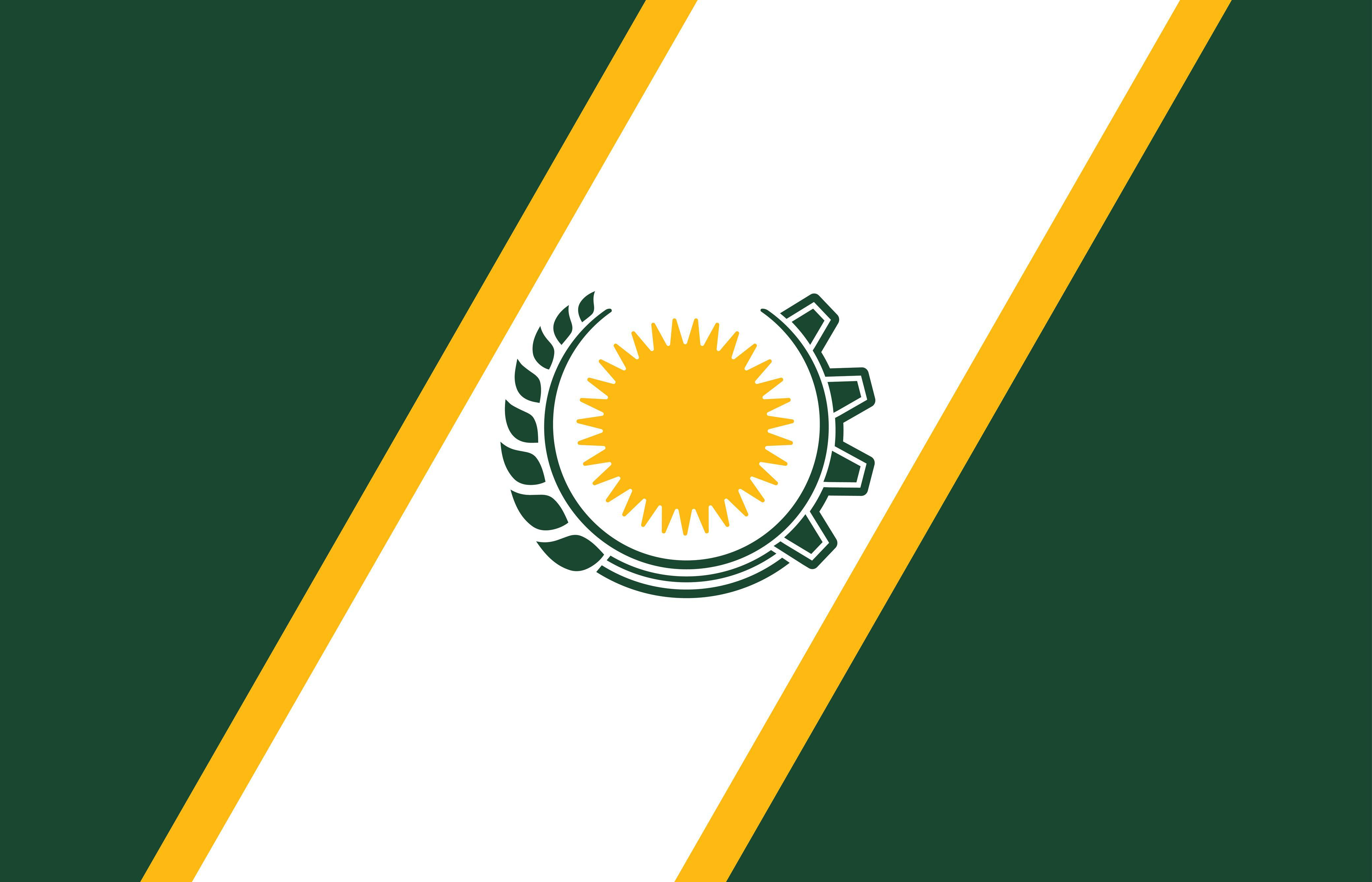
- Flag

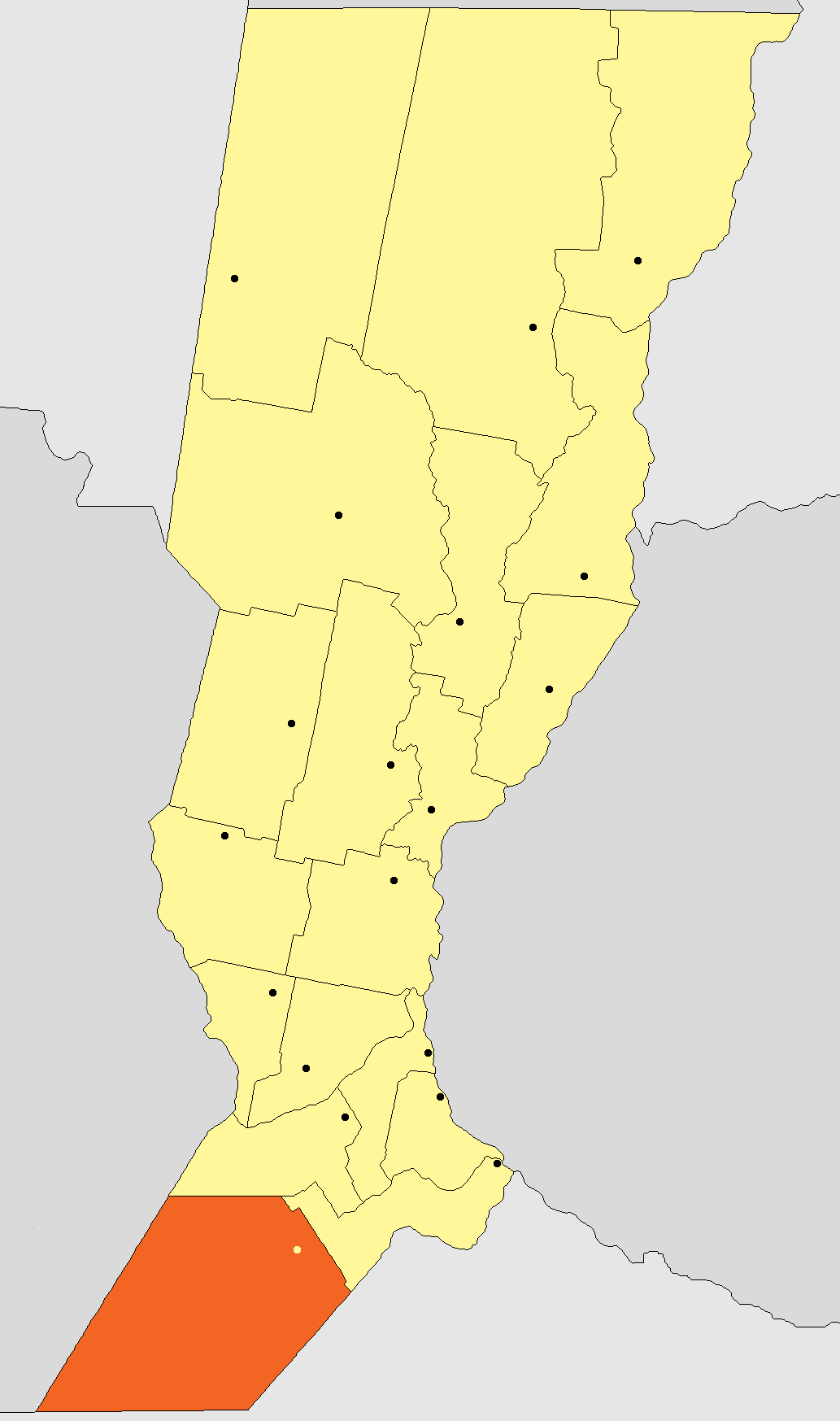
- Location of General López Department within Santa Fe Province
- Coordinates: 33°39′S 61°27′W
- Country: Argentina
- Province: Santa Fe
- Head town: Melincué

Area
  - Total: 11,558 km^{2} (4,463 sq mi)

Population
  - Total: 182,113
  - Density: 15.756/km^{2} (40.809/sq mi)
- Time zone: UTC-3 (ART)

The General López Department (in Spanish, Departamento General López) is an administrative subdivision (departamento) of the province of Santa Fe, Argentina. It is located in the south of the province. Its head town is Melincué (population 2,200), and its largest city is Venado Tuerto (population 70,000).

It is bordered by the Caseros Department in the north, and by the Constitución Department in the north-east; the rest of its borders coincide with interprovincial limits (with Córdoba in the west and with Buenos Aires in the south and east).

The towns and cities in this department are (in alphabetical order): Aarón Castellanos, Amenábar, Cafferata, Cañada del Ucle, Carmen, Carreras, Chapuy, Chovet, Christophersen, Diego de Alvear, Elortondo, Firmat, Hughes, La Chispa, Labordeboy, Lazzarino, Maggiolo, María Teresa, Melincué, Miguel Torres, Murphy, Rufino, San Eduardo, San Francisco de Santa Fe, San Gregorio, Sancti Spiritu, Santa Isabel, Teodelina, Venado Tuerto, Villa Cañás, Wheelwright.

== Economy ==
The General López Department's economy is primarily based on intensive farming. Venado Tuerto, the department's most populous city, is home to the La Victoria Industrial Park, which houses approximately 74 companies in sectors including agroindustry, metalworking, and construction. Companies operating in the region include Agritec Global, which produces liquid fertilizers.

In the oilseed sector, Aceitera General Deheza (AGD), owned by Roberto Urquía, operates storage facilities in Rufino, located in the soybean-producing region of southern Santa Fe Province. In June 2022, MSU Argentina, owned by Manuel Santos Uribelarrea Balcarce, announced plans for a peanut processing plant.
