= MSU Argentina =

MSU Group
- Type: Private
- Industry: Agribusiness; Energy
- Founded: 1998
- Founder: Manuel Santos Uribelarrea Balcarce; Manuel Santos de Uribelarrea Duhau
- Headquarters: Buenos Aires, Argentina
- Key people: Manuel Santos Uribelarrea (CEO)
- Website: msugroup.com msuagro.com.ar msuenergy.com msugreenenergy.com

MSU Group, also known as MSU Argentina, is an Argentine business conglomerate with operations in agriculture, agribusiness and electric power generation. It comprises three independent companies: MSU Agro (large-scale crop production), MSU Energy (thermal power generation) and MSU Green Energy (renewables).

== History and development ==
The Uribelarrea family has a long tradition in Argentine agriculture dating back to 1860.

In 1978, Manuel Santos de Uribelarrea Duhau took over management of the family farms near Villa Cañás, Santa Fe Province, Argentina, focusing on grain production and adopting conservation tillage, crop rotation, soil management and nutrient replacement, no-till farming and genetically modified crops to boost yields while reducing the use of agrochemicals.

In 1998, his son Manuel Santos Uribelarrea founded a new company focused on large-scale farming on owned and leased land; because it was a joint father-and-son venture, it took their shared initials, MSU. From the outset the firm adopted technology such as no-till, precision agriculture and transgenic seed use.

MSU expanded rapidly across different regions of Argentina.

In 2007 the company launched an investment fund for international institutional investors focused on farmland acquisitions in the region.

To strengthen its debt profile as operations grew, in 2013 MSU entered the local capital markets to issue negotiable obligations under the supervision of the National Securities Commission (Comisión Nacional de Valores).

In 2013 it began analyzing projects to produce corn-based ethanol.

In 2016 the group made its first investment in power generation, commissioning three open-cycle thermal power plants built with General Electric technology, located in General Rojo and Barker, Benito Juárez Partido (Buenos Aires Province, Argentina) and Villa María (Córdoba Province, Argentina), each initially rated at 150 MW under long-term power supply agreements with CAMMESA. The plants hold long-term maintenance agreements with General Electric.

In 2020 the three plants were expanded and converted to combined cycle operation, bringing total capacity to about 750 MW.

In 2022 MSU Green Energy was created to develop renewable energy projects. It reports a platform of eight solar parks, with two already in commercial operation by late 2024, three expected to come online by the end of 2024 and three more by mid-2025.

The company has signed supply agreements with corporate customers such as Volkswagen, Dow, Air Liquide, and Unilever, supplying solar power.

In November 2024 MSU Energy launched a transaction to refinance its US$600 million 2025 notes with support from local and international investors and major Argentine banks, completing the refinancing process in January 2025 through an exchange offer and new 2030 senior secured notes alongside a loan facility.

On December 30, 2025, the El Chocón hydroelectric complex was formally incorporated into the group's portfolio, representing an investment of US$236 million. Following this acquisition, in January 2026 the rating agency FIX SCR raised MSU Energy S.A.'s issuer rating to AA-(arg) and MSU Green Energy S.A.U.'s to A+(arg), citing the group's greater scale and diversification after consolidating thermal, solar, and hydroelectric generation.

On June 9, 2026, MSU Green Energy completed the placement of its first international green bond, for an amount of 400 million dollars, at a rate of 9.75% and a 10-year term. According to the company, the proceeds will be used to optimize its capital structure and to finance new projects related to the energy transition in Argentina.

== Structure ==
MSU Group is organized into three independent business units:

MSU Agro: Large-scale crop production across a portfolio of owned and leased farms in Buenos Aires, southern Santa Fe, southern Córdoba, northeastern La Pampa, Entre Ríos, northeastern Santiago del Estero and southwestern Chaco, Argentina. It produces wheat, barley, corn, soybeans, sunflower and peanut. The firm plants about 220,000 ha annually in Argentina, producing over one million tonnes of grain. It also manages an investment fund with agricultural assets in the Brazilian state of Goiás. Most recently it expanded into processing with a peanut plant aimed at supplying European industrial customers.

MSU Energy: Electric power generation through three combined-cycle thermal plants with an aggregate capacity exceeding 750 MW.

MSU Green Energy: Renewable power generation. It operates and is building a platform of solar parks at different stages of development, with a projected capacity of 835 MW. These projects supply clean energy to corporate clients. Considering the operating parks (adding Sáenz Peña and Las Lomitas, Argentina, with entry planned for the following year) and the addition of the El Chocón–Arroyito hydro complex to the portfolio, total installed capacity amounts to 1,747 MW, with estimated annual generation of 3,168 GWh. Based on CAMMESA’s thermal emission factor, this production would avoid about 1,516,037 tonnes of carbon dioxide emissions. In residential terms, the estimated annual energy equals the supply for roughly 936,000 households (assuming 282 kWh/month). In September 2025 the Secretariat of Energy (Secretaría de Energía) awarded the company contracts for two battery energy storage plants under the AlmaGBA tender, part of the contingency plan for critical months in 2024–2026. Under that call, MSU Green Energy won two BESS projects totaling 150 MW. In December 2025 the Ministry of Economy (Ministerio de Economía) issued the pre-award and subsequent award of the El Chocón–Arroyito hydro complex as part of the privatization of Comahue dams. The complex forms part of the regional hydro system, which jointly represents around 14% of Argentina’s generation. After the award, the installed capacity of the complex was reported at 1,418 MW. In January 2026 the National Electricity Regulator (ENRE) approved access to existing transmission capacity to connect the Laguna Yema I and II PV parks in Formosa, Argentina.
