= Alto Valle thermal power plant =

Thermal power station in Argentina

Alto Valle Thermal Power Plant
- Country: Argentina
- Location: Neuquén, Comahue region, northwestern Patagonia
- Status: Operational
- Commission date: 24 February 1969
- Owner: Duke Energy (under concession since 2000)

The Alto Valle Thermal Central is a thermal power station located in the city of Neuquén, Argentina (northwestern Patagonia, Comahue region). It employs natural gas and has an installed capacity of 97 MW. Its output is highly variable, depending on the electric market conditions.

Alto Valle is a combined-cycle plant, employing two independent units, each with a gas turbine feeding a 25 MW gas generator and a 15 MW steam generator, plus an open-cycle 17 MW gas turbine. The combined-cycle units use GEC-Alsthom turbines and generators for gas, and CA Parsons & Co. steam turbines and generators for the steam cycle. The open cycle employs a Fiat TG 16 gas turbine and a Siam di Tella - E. Marelli generator.

The power station was started on 24 February 1969. The combined cycles were installed in 1995. Duke Energy, which also owns the Cerros Colorados Hydroelectric Complex, was granted the exploitation concession in 2000.

== See also ==
- Electric power in Argentina
