= Iván Gabrich =

Argentine footballer

Personal information
- Full name: Iván César Gabrich
- Date of birth: 28 August 1972 (age 54)
- Place of birth: Firmat, Argentina
- Position: Centre forward

Team information
- Current team: Newell's Old Boys (assistant)

Senior career*
Years	Team	Apps	(Gls)
1991–1996	Newell's Old Boys	103	(30)
1996–1997	Ajax	10	(0)
1997–1998	Mérida	36	(1)
1998–1999	Extremadura	28	(2)
1999–2000	Mallorca	5	(0)
2000	Huracán	25	(5)
2000	Vitória		
2000–2001	Huracán	24	(5)
2001–2003	Universidad Católica		

Managerial career
- 2013–: Newell's Old Boys (assistant)
- * Club domestic league appearances and goals

Iván César Gabrich (born 28 August 1972 in Firmat, Santa Fe Province) is an Argentine retired footballer who played as a centre forward. He is the assistant manager of Newell's Old Boys.
