= Arroyito =

Arroyito may refer to:

== Geography ==
- Arroyito, Córdoba, Argentina;
- Arroyito, Neuquén, Argentina
- Arroyito, Salta (es) in Salta, Argentina
- Barrio Arroyito, popular name of Barrio Lisandro de la Torre, Rosario, Santa Fe, Argentina;
- Arroyito (de) town in Santa Cruz Department (Bolivia)
- Arroyity, Paraguay
- Arroyito stream, (es) in Treinta y Tres Department, Uruguay.

== Music ==
- "Arroyito", song composed by Agustín Lara and sung by himself in the film Mujer en condominio (1958)
- Arroyito (song), a song by Fonseca
