= Alicurá Dam =

Dam in Patagonia, Argentina

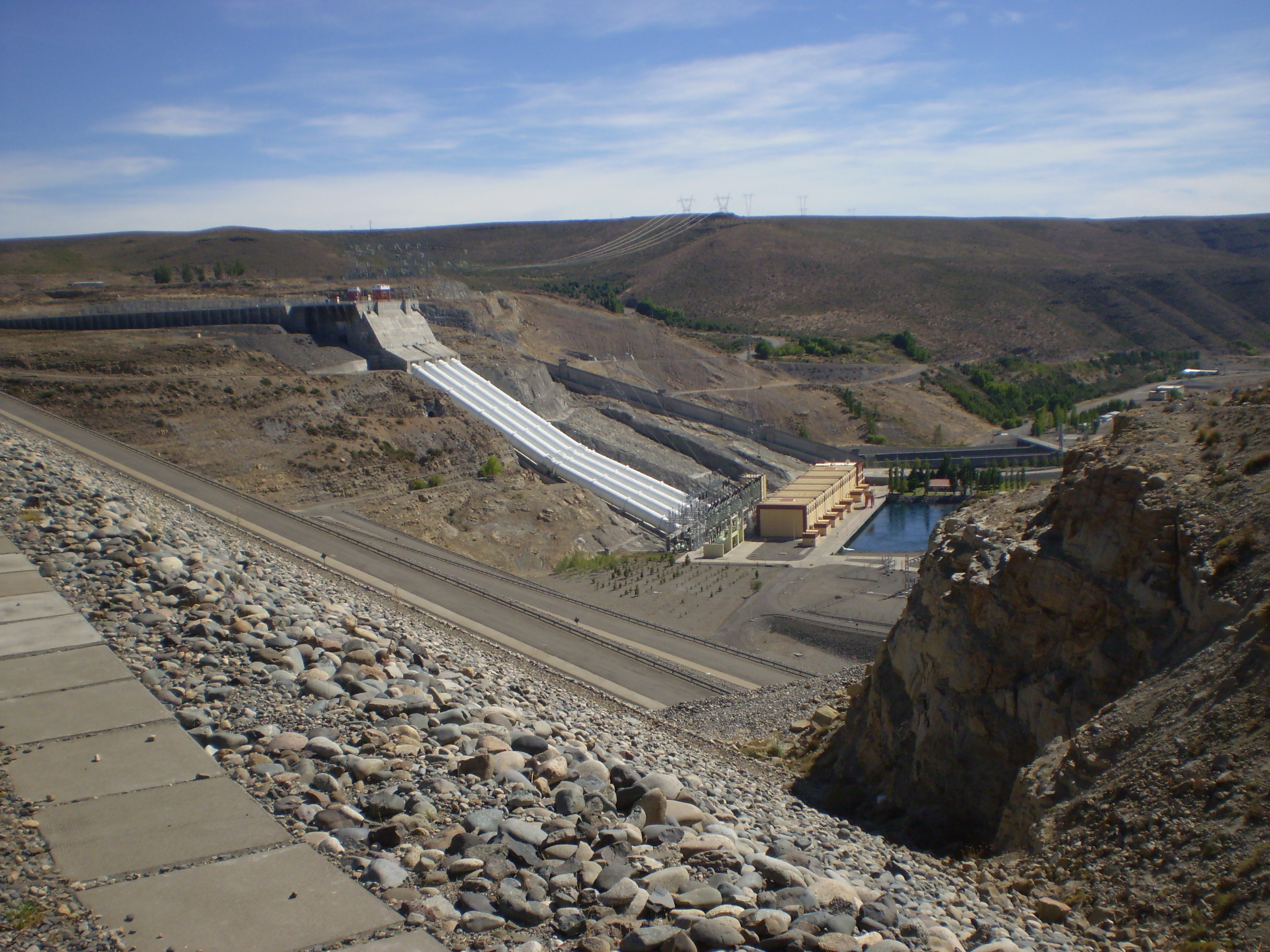

- Location within Argentina
- Official name: AES Alicurá
- Country: Argentina
- Location: Patagonia
- Coordinates: 40°35′10″S 70°45′09″W
- Status: Operational
- Opening date: 1985
- Owner: AES Argentina

Dam and spillways
- Impounds: Limay River
- Height: 135 m (443 ft)
- Dam volume: 13,000,000 m^{3} (460,000,000 cu ft)
- Spillway capacity: 3,000 m^{3}/s (110,000 cu ft/s)

Reservoir
- Inactive capacity: 3,215,000,000 m^{3} (2,606,000 acre⋅ft)
- Surface area: 67.5 km^{2} (26.1 sq mi)

Power Station
- Turbines: 4 x 262.5 MW (352,000 hp) Francis-type
- Installed capacity: 1,050 MW (1,410,000 hp)

The Alicurá Dam (in Spanish, Embalse de Alicurá) is the first of five dams on the Limay River in northwestern Argentine Patagonia (the Comahue region), about 100 kilometres (62 mi) from the city of San Carlos de Bariloche and 705 metres (2,313 ft) above mean sea level. It was inaugurated in 1985.

The dam is used primarily for the generation of hydroelectricity with an installed capacity of 1,050 MW. The reservoir is also employed to raise Salmonidae.

The Alicurá reservoir has an area of 67.5 square kilometres (26.1 sq mi), a mean depth of 48.4 metres (159 ft) (maximum 110 metres (360 ft)), and a volume of 3,215,000,000 cubic metres (2,606,000 acre⋅ft).
