= Pichi Picún Leufú Dam =

Dam in Patagonia, Argentina

- Location within Argentina
- Country: Argentina
- Location: Patagonia
- Coordinates: 40.011592°S 69.990849°W
- Status: Operational

Dam and spillways
- Type of dam: Embankment dam
- Impounds: Limay River
- Height: 45 m (148 ft)
- Length: 1,045 m (3,428 ft)
- Dam volume: 1,562,000 m^{3} (55,200,000 cu ft)

Reservoir
- Total capacity: 197×10^{6} m^{3} (160,000 acre⋅ft)
- Surface area: 19 km^{2} (7.3 sq mi)

Power Station
- Installed capacity: 261 MW (350,000 hp)

The Pichi Picún Leufú Dam (in Spanish Embalse Pichi Picún Leufú) is the third of five dams on the Limay River in northwestern Argentine Patagonia (the Comahue region), near the town of Piedra del Águila.

The dam is used for the generation of hydroelectricity and for the regulation of the flow. It measures 45 metres (148 ft) in height and 1,045 metres (3,428 ft) in length, and is made of 1,562 million cubic metres (55.2×10^{9} cu ft) of loose materials. It was built by the Sweden-based multinational Skanska, and inaugurated in 2000.

The reservoir has an area of 19 square kilometres (7.3 sq mi) and a volume of 197 million cubic metres (160,000 acre⋅ft) in maximum normal conditions.

The hydroelectric plant has an installed power of 261 megawatts (350,000 hp) and generates an annual average of 1,080 gigawatt-hours (3,900 TJ). It employs three vertical-axis Kaplan turbines.
