= Melincué Lake =

Laguna Melincué
- Location within Argentina
- Location: General López Department, Santa Fe Province
- Coordinates: 33°42′24″S 61°29′4″W
- Type: endorheic lake
- Basin countries: Argentina
- Surface area: 120 square kilometres (46 sq mi) (2003)
- Surface elevation: 86 metres (282 ft) (2003); 82.5 metres (271 ft) (1968)

Ramsar Wetland
- Official name: Humedal Laguna Melincué
- Designated: 24 July 2008
- Reference no.: 1785

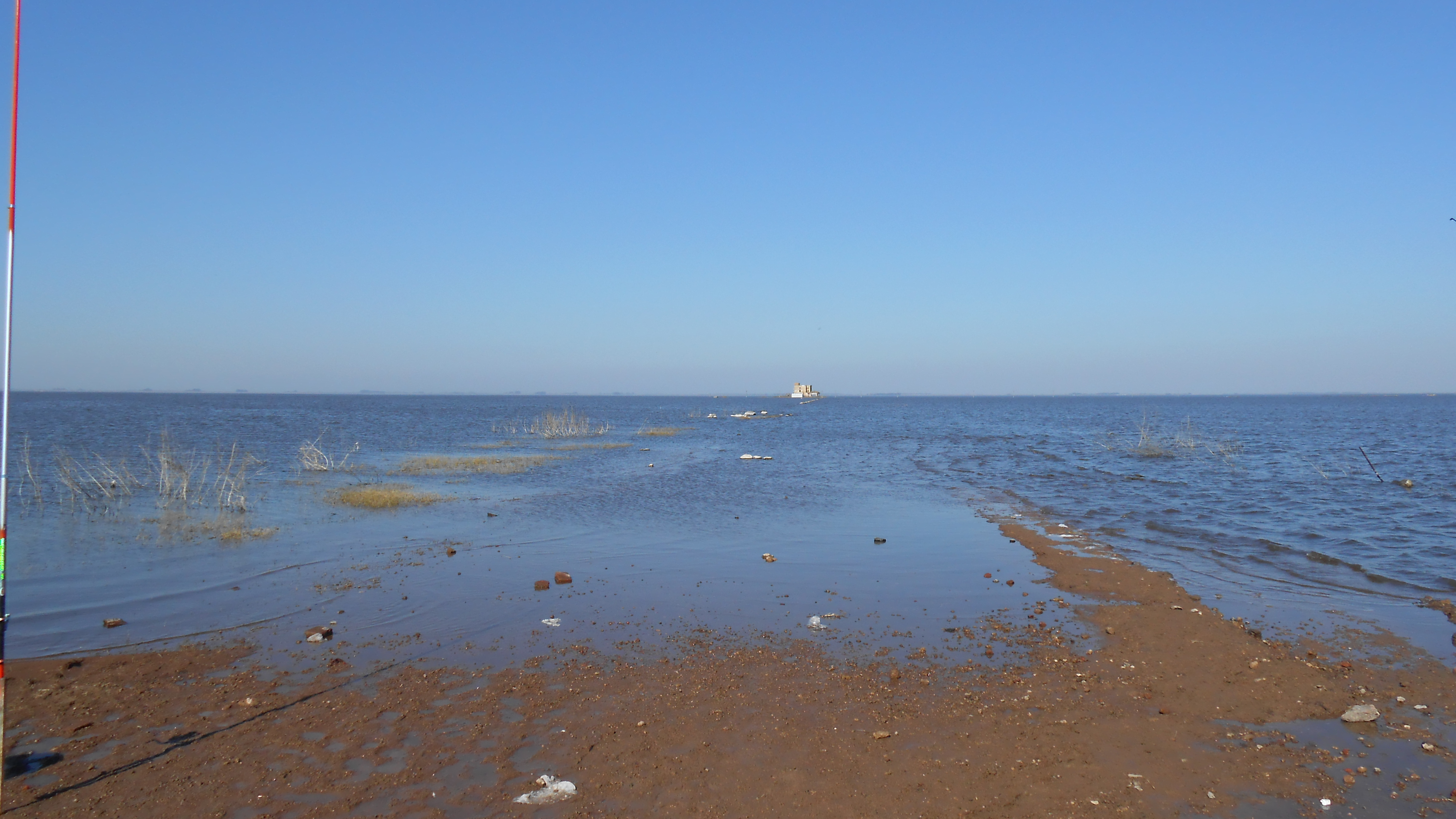

The Laguna Melincué is an endorheic lake located in the province of Santa Fe, Argentina, in the General López Department, next to the town of Melincué, at approximately 33°42′24″S 61°29′4″W. It covers a surface area of about 120 km^{2}, and its top water level lies at around 86 m above mean sea level (c. 2003).

The lake forms part of a wetland ecosystem, noted for its large population of waterfowl and other birds, which is protected as a nature reserve. In times of drought the lake's waters became saline. In 2008 an area of 920 km^{2} has been listed as a Wetland of International Importance under the Ramsar convention.

For decades the water level of the Melincué Lake have varied considerably, often flooding parts of its basin, and over time this has seriously affected the prosperity of the nearby towns and the maintenance of roads around it. According to a study by the Faculty of Engineering of the Universidad Nacional de Rosario, in 1968 the top water level stood at 82.5 m AMSL, more than 3 m below its current height. In 1998–2000 the provincial government passed legislation creating a Strategic Environmental Planning Area covering the surrounding districts (Melincué, Carreras, Hughes, Elortondo and Labordeboy) with the goal of promoting its sustainable development, but major concrete actions have failed to materialize.
