= Cerros Colorados Complex =

Coordinates: 38°30′S 68°50′W

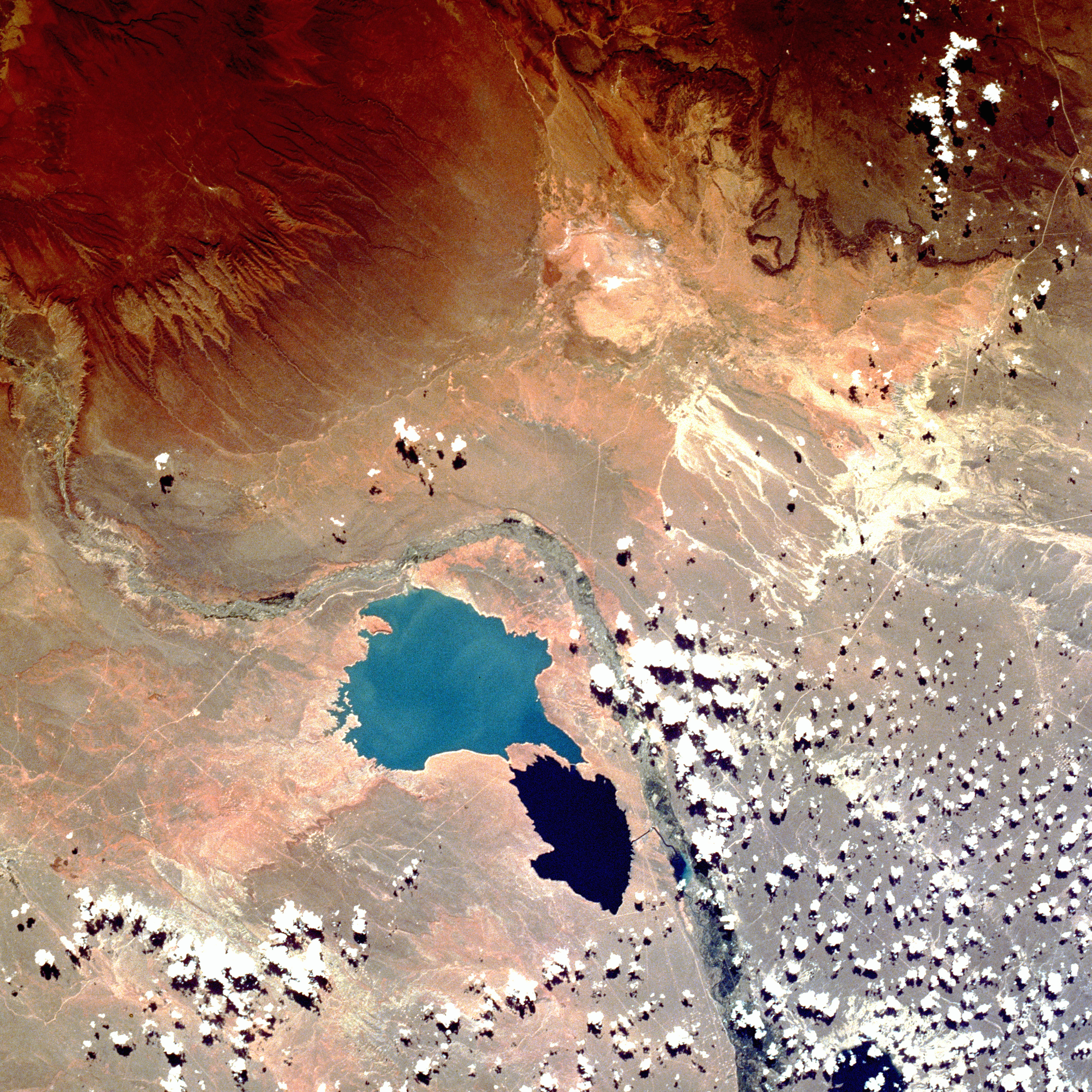
Cerros Colorados Complex, photographed from the Space Shuttle. Los Barreales is the lighter blue lake on top; Mari Menuco is the smaller and darker one. The river flows from the top-left, turns to the right of the lakes and then down.

The Cerros Colorados Complex is a group of dams and hydroelectricity generation facilities on the lower valley of the Neuquén River, in Neuquén, Argentina.

== History ==
The complex was started in 1969, and the first machine started functioning in 1978. The complex was officially inaugurated on 31 October 1980. In 1993 it was privatized by a concession grant to Hidroeléctrica Cerros Colorados S.A. In 2000, Duke Energy acquired Cerros Colorados and the Alto Valle thermal power plant.

Cerros Colorados is itself part of a larger engineering scheme, commonly known as the El Chocón-Cerros Colorados Complex, which includes the dam and hydroelectric plant of El Chocón located upstream, on the Limay River.

== Constituent works ==
Cerros Colorados consists of four dams (Portezuelo Grande, Loma de la Lata, Planicie Banderita and El Chañar), and takes advantage of two deep natural depressions, called Los Barreales and Mari Menuco.

The Portezuelo Grande Dam (upstream) re-routes the waters of the river towards Los Barreales Lake, except for those destined to irrigation, domestic supply and ecological use. The water in Los Barreales then flows toward Mari Menuco, through a passage controlled by the Loma de la Lata Dam. The water level in Mari Menuco is kept 69 metres (226 ft) higher than that of the river in Planicie Banderita.

The Planicie Banderita hydroelectric power plant, employs two Siemens generators equipped with vertical-axis Francis turbines (each with a nominal power of 243 megawatts (326,000 hp)) to generate 1,512 gigawatt-hours (5,440 TJ) per year. The plant then returns the waters to the course of the river. Planicie Banderita delivers the generated electric power at 500 kV to the National Interconnection System.

The flow of the river is further adjusted about 10 kilometres (6.2 mi) downstream from Planicie Banderita by a small check dam, El Chañar.
