= Melincué =

- Town
- Location of Melincué in Argentina
- Coordinates: 33°39′S 61°27′W
- Country: Argentina
- Province: Santa Fe
- Department: General López

Government
  - Communal President: Silvio Garbolino (LLA)

Area
  - Total: 277 km^{2} (107 sq mi)

Population
  - Total: 2,228
  - Density: 8.04/km^{2} (20.8/sq mi)
- Time zone: UTC−3 (ART)
- CPA base: S2728
- Dialing code: +54 3465

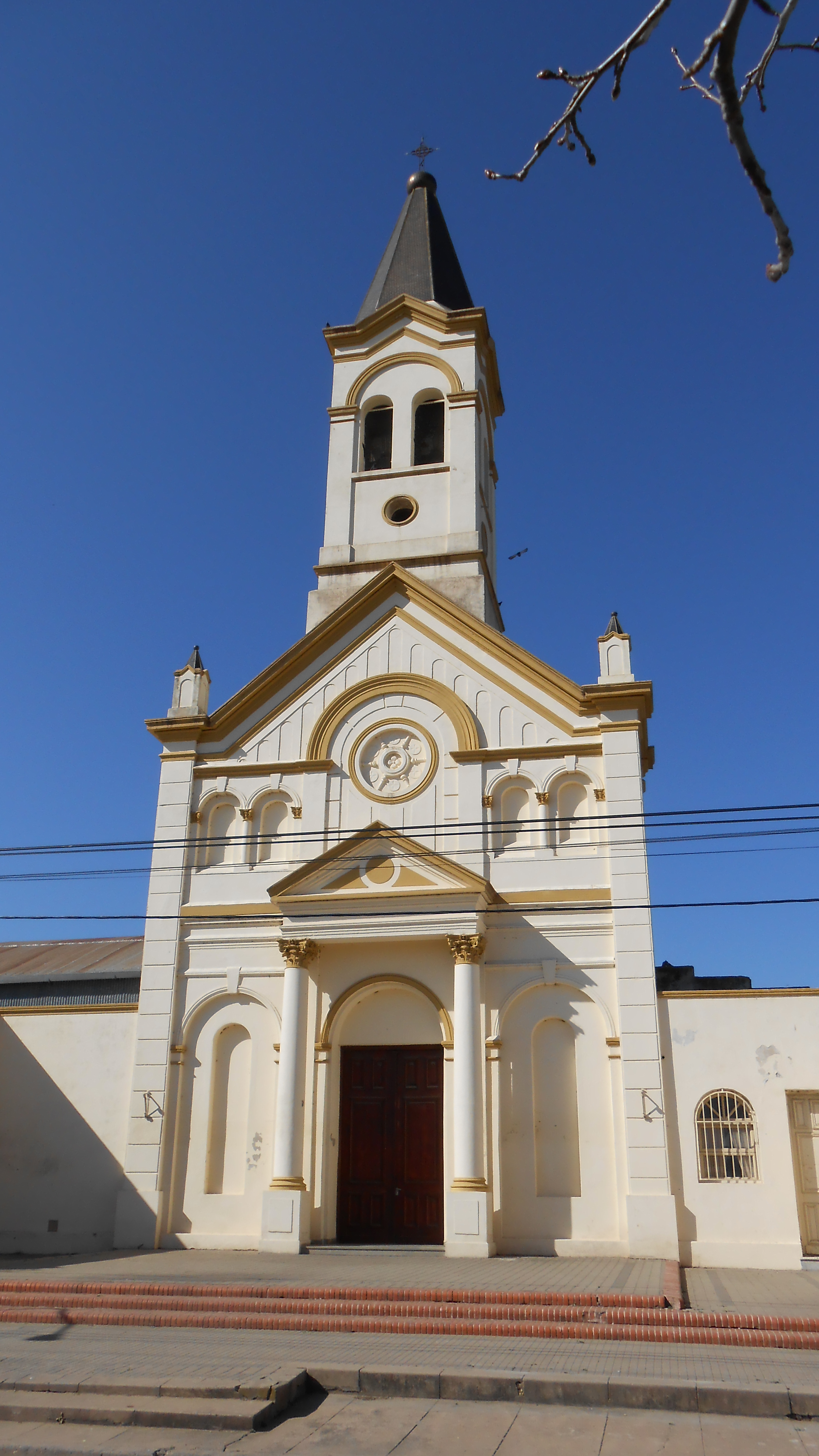
Melincué Church of Our Lady of Carmen.

Melincué is a town (comuna) in the south of the province of Santa Fe, Argentina, 287 km from the provincial capital. It has about 2,200 inhabitants as per the 2001 census [INDEC] and it is the head town of the General López Department. It was founded in 1872 and recognized officially as a town on 3 September 1986.

Melincué is located immediately north of an endorheic lake (Laguna Melincué) and an associated wetland area that is included in a nature reserve. The fluctuating level of the Melincué Lake and the lack of hydrical infrastructure have often caused the town to suffer floods.
