= Vassalli Fabril =

Argentine automotive heavy equipment manufacturer

- Industry: Automotive Heavy equipment
- Founded: Firmat, Santa Fe Province, Argentina 1949 (77 years ago)
- Founder: Roque Vassalli
- Headquarters: Firmat, Santa Fe Province, Argentina
- Area served: Argentina; Brazil; Venezuela
- Key people: Roque Vassalli; Mariana Rossi Vassalli; Néstor Girolami
- Products: Combine harvesters Farm implements

Vassalli Fabril S.A. is an Argentina-based company that produces combine harvesters and farm implements, including the brands Vassalli and Don Roque. It has three manufacturing plants located in Firmat, Santa Fe Province, occupying a total area of 99000 m² with a production capacity of 600 units a year. At the regional level, Vassalli Fabril competes with international producers based in Brazil and Argentina.

== History ==
In 1949, Roque Vassalli established Vassalli Fabril S.A., originally called Vassalli Roque S.A., in Firmat, Santa Fe Province. Within a few years, the Firmat plant produced its first model of a combine harvester, the Super Vassalli. The company eventually launched more than 20 different models.

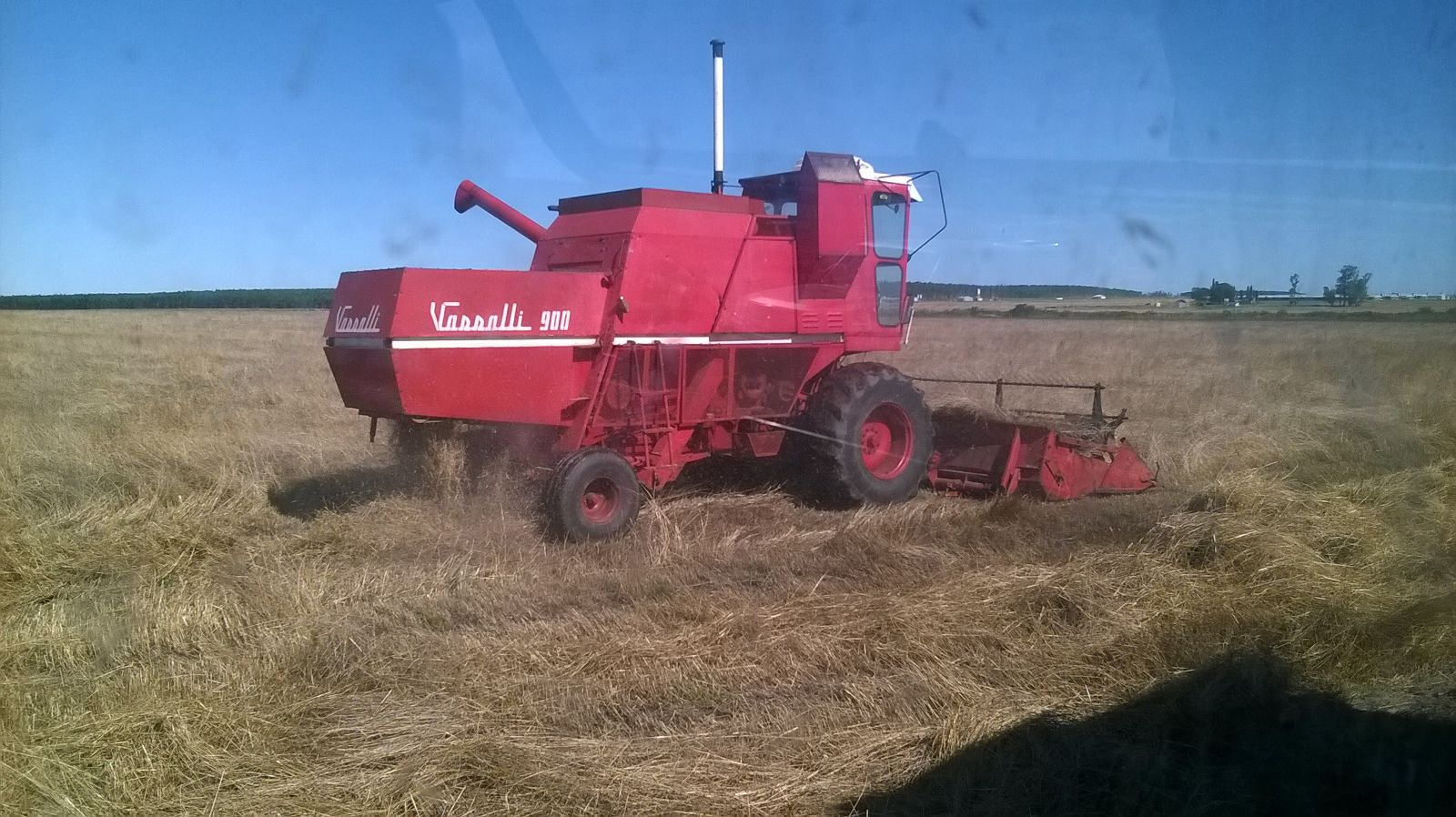
Vassalli 900 harvester threshing in fields of the Province of Entre Ríos

In the economic uncertainty of 1987, Vassalli sold Vassalli Roque S.A. and kept Vassalli Fabril S.A. Within the next few years, the company began to re-fabricate collectors and produce a combine harvester called Don Roque. The company also expanded its product line to include a light truck with a cargo payload of 4.5 tons, a minibus for 18 passengers and a utility vehicle type jeep for civil and military use.

In 1988, the factory was bought by Grupo Koner Salgado, in association with Zanello. The company split in two as Roque Vassalli S.A., in the hands of Salgado, took the old plant, and Vassalli Fabril S.A. took "Don Roque".

In 2003, the Vassalli family recovered the combine harvester factory after paying 6 million pesos as part of a judicial bidding. Don Roque Vassalli's nephews announced that the production of combine harvesters would restart with over two hundred workers employed at the time of bankruptcy. By 2016, the Vassalli family sold Vasalli Fabril S.E. to a dealer network.

On 1 January 2018, Vassalli Fabril announced the dismissal of 52 workers for "lack and reduction of work". The owner, Néstor Girolami, said that the Firmat plant would diversify with the production of mowers and self-unloading machines to improve revenues.
