= Arroyito, Neuquén =

Arroyito
- Municipality and village
- Location within Neuquén Province Location within Argentina
- Coordinates: 39°5′S 68°35′W
- Country: Argentina
- Province: Neuquén Province
- Department: Confluencia Department

Population (2001)
  - Total: 81
- Time zone: UTC−3 (ART)
- Climate: BWk

Arroyito is a village and municipality in Neuquén Province in southwestern Argentina. It is located 54 km south of the city of Neuquén, at the junction of National Route 22 and National Highway 237. Arroyito has 81 inhabitants (INDEC, 2001), representing an increase of 68.75% in ten years compared to the previous census with 48 inhabitants (INDEC, 1991).

The Arroyito Dam lies on the Limay River, about 55 kilometres from the village. It has a heavy water production plant with a capacity of 200 t / year, operated by the state company ENSI. The Sulzer Brothers of Switzerland were hired to implement the project, originally intended for completion in 1984.
