= Arroyito Dam =

Dam in Argentine Patagonia

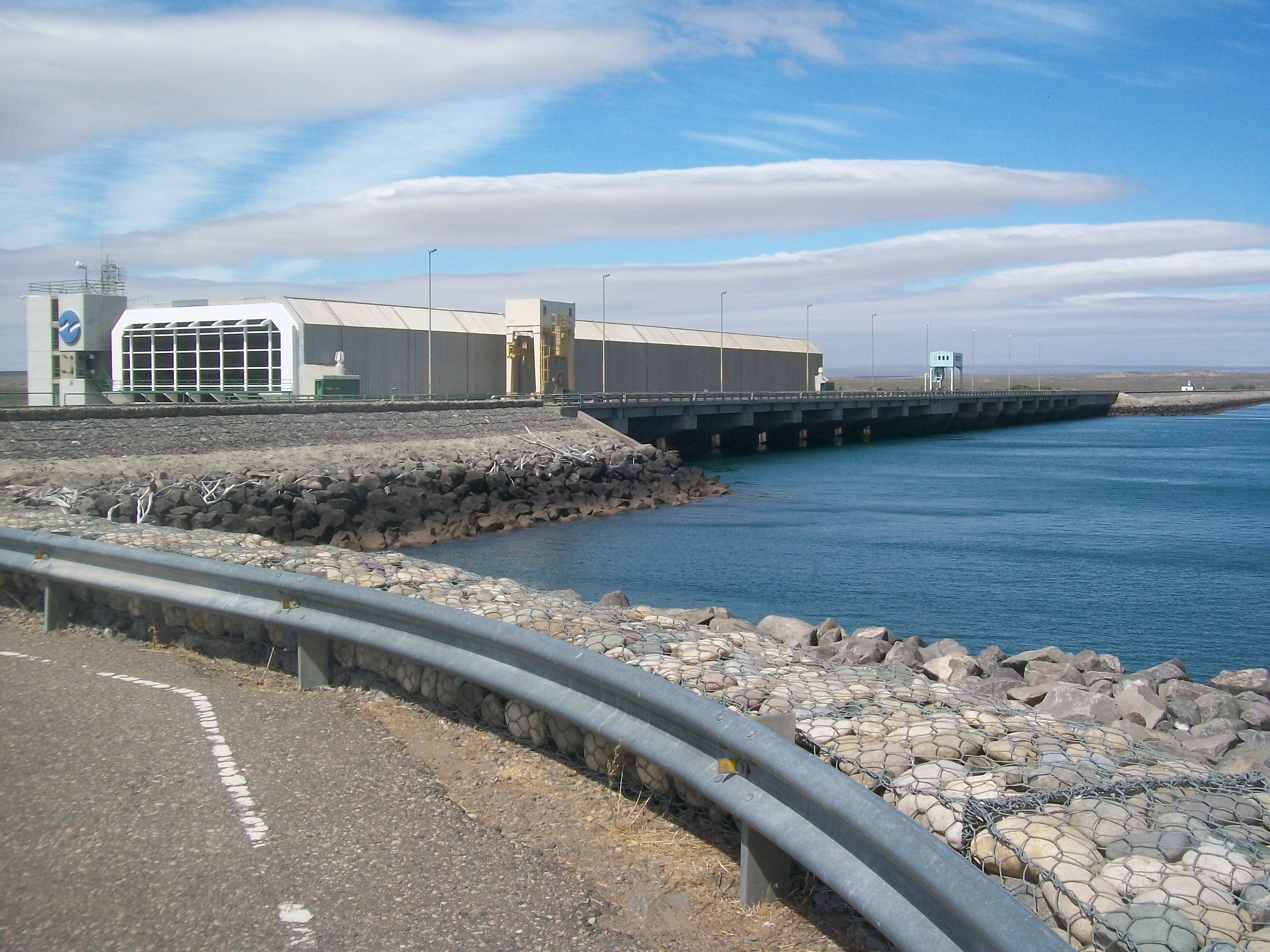
- Interactive map of Arroyito Dam
- Country: Argentina
- Coordinates: 39°06′25.2″S 68°35′07.8″W
- Status: Operational
- Opening date: 1979

Dam and spillways
- Impounds: Limay River
- Height (thalweg): 26 m (85 ft)

Reservoir
- Surface area: 38.6 km^{2} (14.9 sq mi)
- Normal elevation: 315 m (1,033 ft)

Power Station
- Turbines: 3 x 42,6 MW
- Installed capacity: 127.8 MW

The Arroyito Dam (in Spanish, Embalse de Arroyito) is the fifth of five dams on the Limay River in northwestern Argentine Patagonia (the Comahue region), at 315 metres (1,033 ft) above mean sea level. It was inaugurated in 1979.

The dam is made of compacted loose materials. It has a volume of 4 million cubic metres (140×10^{6} cu ft), measuring 37 metres (121 ft) in height and 3,500 metres (11,500 ft) in length. It is used primarily for the generation of hydroelectricity, with an installed power of 127.8 megawatts (171,400 hp). It generates on average 560 gigawatt-hours (2,000 TJ) per year. It also serves as a check dam for El Chocón, located upstream.

The reservoir has an area of 38.6 square kilometres (14.9 sq mi) and a volume of 300 million cubic metres (11×10^{9} cu ft). Its depth is 7.7 metres (25 ft) on average (maximum: 15 metres (49 ft)).
