= Piedra del Águila Dam =

Dam in Patagonia, Argentina

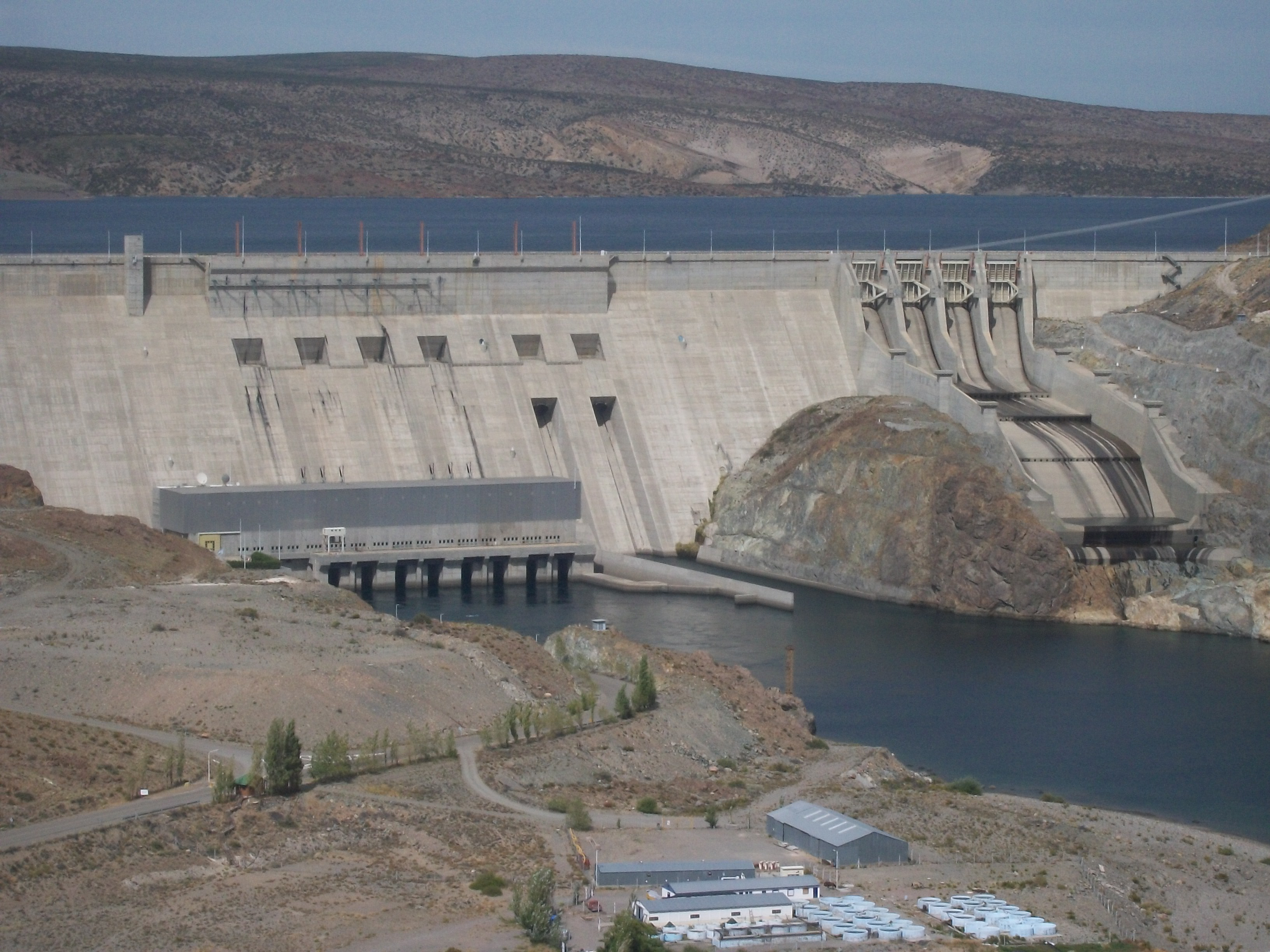

- Location within Argentina
- Country: Argentina
- Location: Patagonia
- Coordinates: 40°11′25″S 69°59′29″W
- Status: Operational
- Construction began: 1988
- Opening date: 1992

Dam and spillways
- Type of dam: Gravity, concrete
- Impounds: Limay River
- Height: 180 m (590 ft)
- Length: 800 m (2,600 ft)

Reservoir
- Total capacity: 12,600×10^{6} m^{3} (10,200,000 acre⋅ft)
- Surface area: 292 km^{2} (113 sq mi)

Power Station
- Turbines: 4 x 350 MW (470,000 hp) Francis-type
- Installed capacity: 1,400 MW (1,900,000 hp)

The Piedra del Águila Dam (in Spanish, Embalse Piedra del Águila) is the second of five dams on the Limay River in northwestern Argentine Patagonia (the Comahue region) and 590 metres (1,940 ft) above mean sea level, downstream from the confluence of the Limay and the Collón Curá River. It was inaugurated in 1993.

The dam is used for the generation of hydroelectricity and the regulation of the flow of the river. Its reservoir has an area of 292 square kilometres (113 sq mi), a mean depth of 41.3 metres (135 ft) (maximum 120 metres (390 ft)), and a volume of 12,600 million cubic metres (10,200,000 acre⋅ft).
