= Firmat =

- City
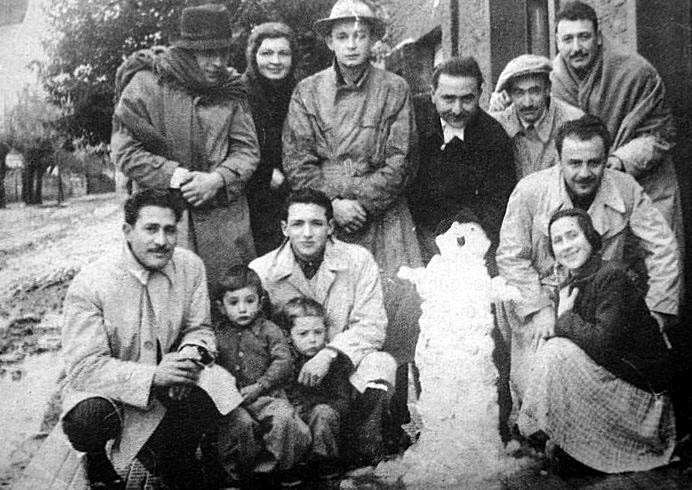
- People of Firmat with a snowman, c.1945

- Location of Firmat in Argentina
- Coordinates: 33°27′S 61°29′W
- Country: Argentina
- Province: Santa Fe
- Department: General López

Government
  - Intendant: Fabio Leonel Maximino (UCR)

Area
  - Total: 226 km^{2} (87 sq mi)
- Elevation: 96 m (315 ft)

Population (2010)
  - Total: 19,757
  - Density: 87.4/km^{2} (226/sq mi)
- Demonym: firmatense
- Time zone: UTC−3 (ART)
- CPA base: S2630
- Dialing code: +54 3465
- Website: firmat.gov.ar -->

Firmat is a city located in the south of Santa Fe Province of Argentina in the Departamento General López. The main economic activities are agro-industry and agriculture. The city covers an area of about 226 square kilometres (87 sq mi). The population of Firmat was 19,757 at the 2010 national census. The annual temperature of the city usually ranges between 10 and 23 degrees Celsius (50 and 73 °F).

== History ==
=== Early years ===
Firmat was founded in 1888, when a railway station by that name was completed at the location along the Santa Fe Western Railway. The line owed its existence to a Spanish Argentine investor, Carlos Casado del Alisal, who is regarded as the town's founder. The commune itself was formally established on November 20, 1894. The Firmat Football Club was founded 13 years later, in 1907, and the Club Atlético Argentino de Firmat, in 1922. The town became an important center of Argentine agriculture, and some of the town's main employers include Vassalli Fabril, a firm specializing in farm equipment founded in Firmat in 1949, and Nestlé. Firmat was recognized as a municipality by the Provincial Legislature in 1962. The city's local news daily is Diario Firmat.

=== "Haunted" swing ===
In June 2007, a swing in a children's playground was reported to the police after locals had discovered that it would move backwards and forwards non-stop on its own for ten days before stopping dead, while other swings would remain still. Parents and children were convinced that a ghost was to blame. According to a teacher, "One child called it the Blair Witch Playground. We believe it is haunted." Parents decided that the playground must indeed be haunted.

For the April 13, 2011, episode of the Syfy Channel show, Fact or Faked: Paranormal Files, the crew went to Firmat to investigate the haunted swing. They were able to recreate the movement of the swing with a monofilament, but determined that it was not a viable hoax. Ultimately, after covering the swing with an inflatable dome and performing simulated wind tests, they determined that wind was the probable culprit coupled with the fact that the haunted swing was slightly larger than the other swings and had more surface area to catch the wind.

According to a 2017 article by Ranker, the swing "has been swinging by itself for five years - even when people try to stop it from moving". It is claimed that the swing is used by the ghost of a small child, who died nearby before the playground was built.
