= El Chocón Dam =

The El Chocón Dam
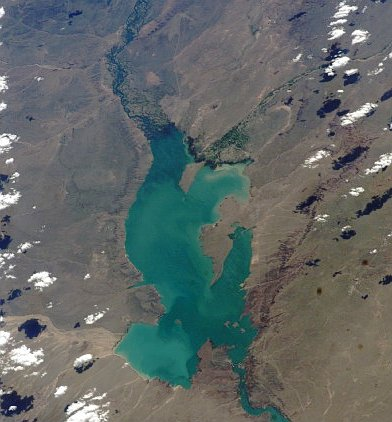
- The El Chocón Reservoir, as seen from the International Space Station. The dam is located on the bottom part of the picture.
- Interactive map of The El Chocón Dam
- Official name: Embalse Ezequiel Ramos Mexía
- Location: Villa El Chocón, Neuquén, Argentina
- Coordinates: 39°15′57″S 68°45′23″W
- Construction began: 1968 (assembly of workshops and accessories)
- Opening date: First unit: December 22, 1972; complete closure: 1977
- Construction cost: World Bank financing (~USD 82 million + parallel loans); repair: ~USD 50 million
- Owner: Argentine national government

Dam and spillways
- Type of dam: loose material dam
- Impounds: Limay River, Neuquén Province
- Height: 94 m (308 ft)
- Length: 2,500 m (8,200 ft)
- Width (base): 2,250 m (7,380 ft)
- Spillway type: Surface with sector gates
- Spillway capacity: 8,000 m³/s

Reservoir
- Creates: Ezequiel Ramos Mexía Reservoir
- Total capacity: ~20,155 million m³ (20,155 Hm³)
- Catchment area: Limay River basin (~54,749 km²)
- Surface area: ~816 km²
- Maximum water depth: 60–64 m.

Power Station
- Operator: BML Inversora S.A.U. (MSU Argentina) (concession 2025–2055)
- Commission date: Started in 1973; full capacity in 1978.
- Decommission date: Has not occurred; remains in operation.
- Turbines: 6 × 210 MW vertical Francis turbines
- Installed capacity: 1,260 MW
- Annual generation: 2,700 GWh (historical average); ~3,350 GWh in project design
- Website; Central hidroeléctrica El Chocón

The El Chocón Dam (officially the El Chocón–Cerros Colorados Complex) is one of the most iconic engineering works in Patagonia and the Argentine Republic. Located on the Limay River, in the northwestern region of Patagonia known as Comahue, it is 381 meters above sea level and approximately 80 kilometers upstream from the confluence of the Limay and Neuquén Rivers.

Conceived as part of a strategic hydroelectric development and water regulation plan, El Chocón performs vital functions: regulating the flow of the Limay River, ensuring irrigation water in large areas of the Upper and Middle Valleys, and, above all, generating large-scale hydroelectric power. Its plant is the largest in Patagonia and one of the most important in Argentina, with an installed capacity of 1,260 MW.

The dam's construction was carried out by the state-owned company Hidronor (Hidroeléctrica Norpatagónica S.A.), and it marked a milestone in the history of Argentine public works. The first generator began operating in 1972, and the dam reached full generating capacity in 1977. During the period 1974–1995, the plant produced an annual average of 2,700 GWh, becoming a pillar of the national energy supply.

As of 2025, the engineering project formally known as the Ezequiel Ramos Mexía Reservoir is still commonly referred to by the name of the settlement that served as the basis for its construction, Villa El Chocón. Although small, this town has grown since the 2001 census, and according to the 2022 census, its population is 1,180.

El Chocón is part of a larger hydroelectric project that also includes the Cerros Colorados Complex, located on the Neuquén River. The Hydroelectric Complex, which encompasses the El Chocón and Arroyito plants, is located in the region known as Comahue. This area encompasses the provinces of Río Negro and Neuquén.

== Technical details ==
The El Chocón Dam is one of the most significant engineering works in Argentine Patagonia and a fundamental pillar of the country's hydroelectric system. Its magnitude is reflected in the dam's infrastructure, the size of its reservoir, and the power of its generating plant. Its main technical characteristics are presented below.

=== Dam structure ===
The El Chocón Dam is a loose-material dam with an impermeable core, complemented by a reinforced concrete spillway. Approximately 13,000,000 cubic meters of materials were used for its construction, demonstrating the magnitude of the project.

The dam's crest reaches a length that varies, depending on sources, between 2,250 and 2,500 meters, with a maximum height above the riverbed estimated at between 86 and 87 meters. These dimensions, confirmed by official agencies and technical sources, place El Chocón as one of the largest earthwork dams in the country.

=== Reservoir ===
The dam forms a reservoir of colossal proportions. The flooded area covers approximately 816 km², although other estimates raise the figure to 860 km², making it one of the largest artificial bodies of water in Argentina.

The reservoir's average depth is 24.7 meters, with a maximum depth reaching 60 meters. In terms of capacity, it can store approximately 20,600 cubic hectometers of water, equivalent to 20.6 billion cubic meters. Some sources record a value closer to 20,155 hm³, a difference attributable to variations in calculation methods and the lake's operating level.

These data are consistent with specialized literature, confirming the magnitude of the reservoir popularly known as the "inland sea of Patagonia."

=== Hydroelectric plant ===
The El Chocón power plant is equipped with six vertical-axis Francis turbines, each with a nominal capacity of 210 megawatts (MW). This results in a total installed capacity of 1,200 MW, although some sources raise the figure to 1,260 MW, depending on the technical criteria used.

The turbines rotate at a speed of 88 revolutions per minute (rpm), transforming hydraulic energy into mechanical energy, which is then converted into electricity. Thanks to this equipment, the plant records an average annual generation of between 2,700 and 3,350 gigawatt-hours (GWh), representing a significant contribution to the national grid.

The accuracy of these figures confirms the robustness of the information available on the operation of the hydroelectric complex.

=== Uses of the Reservoir ===
Beyond its energy role, the El Chocón reservoir performs multiple functions that benefit both the region and the country. These include:

- Flow regulation, essential for preventing floods and optimizing the use of water resources.
- Agricultural irrigation, promoting productive development in nearby areas.
- Power generation, its primary and strategic function.
- Boating and sport fishing, activities that have boosted tourism.
- Recreation for residents and visitors, consolidating the reservoir as a cultural and natural attraction.

These combined functions make El Chocón an example of multipurpose infrastructure.

=== Data comparison ===
The following summary compares the values most cited in the literature with the technical data collected as of August 2025.

Item recorded	Data	Confirmation	Source adjustment
Dam type	Earth with concrete spillway	Confirmed	
Material volume	about 13,000,000 m^{3} (460,000,000 cu ft)	Confirmed	
Crest length	2,500 m (8,200 ft)	Coincident	2,250–2,500 m (7,380–8,200 ft)
Maximum height	87 m (285 ft)	Confirmed	about 86–87 m (282–285 ft)
Reservoir surface area	about 860 km^{2} (330 sq mi)	Confirmed	816–860 km^{2} (315–332 sq mi)
Average / maximum depth	24.7 m (81 ft) / 60 m (200 ft)	Confirmed	
Maximum reservoir volume	20,600 hm^{3} (7.3×10^{11} cu ft)	Confirmed	about 20,155–20,600 hm^{3} (7.118×10^{11}–7.275×10^{11} cu ft)
Turbines and unit power	6 × 210 MW at 88 rpm	Confirmed	
Recreational uses	Boating, fishing, and tourism	Confirmed	

== Concession ==
The dam was originally built and operated by the state-owned company Hidronor (Hidroeléctrica Norpatagónica S.A.), created specifically to develop the hydroelectric potential of the Comahue region. Following Argentina's energy sector reforms in the 1990s, the concession was transferred to Enel Generación El Chocón S.A., which operated the complex until 2025.

In December 2025, the El Chocón hydroelectric complex was awarded to MSU Argentina as part of the broader transfer of dam concessions in the Comahue region. The award was made through a competitive bid of US$235.67 million and covers a 30-year concession period. The complex has an installed capacity of 1,418 MW, placing it among the highest-capacity power stations in the Argentine electricity system. BML Inversora S.A.U. — part of the MSU Group of Manuel Santos Uribelarrea — formally took over the concession in December 2025.

== See also ==
- List of power stations in Argentina
