= Villa Cañás =

- City
- Location of Villa Cañás in Argentina
- Coordinates: 34°0′S 61°36′W
- Country: Argentina
- Province: Santa Fe
- Department: General López

Government
  - Intendant: Norberto Raúl Gizzi (UCR)

Area
  - Total: 591 km^{2} (228 sq mi)
- Elevation: 100 m (330 ft)

Population (2022 census)
  - Total: 9,817
  - Density: 16.6/km^{2} (43.0/sq mi)
- Demonym: cañaseño
- Time zone: UTC−3 (ART)
- CPA base: S2607
- Dialing code: +54 3462

Villa Cañás is a small city in the south of the province of Santa Fe, Argentina, some 370 km from the provincial capital and not far from Venado Tuerto.

It has about 9,817 inhabitants as per the 2022 census [INDEC].

The city was founded in 1902 by Juan Cañás, and acknowledged as a comuna (a minor municipality) on 1903-03-07.

== People ==
Notable people born in Villa Cañás include:

- Mirtha Legrand (born Rosa María Juana Martínez Suárez, 1927) – Argentine actress, television presenter and producer, twin sister of Silvia Legrand
- Silvia Legrand (born María Aurelia Paula Martínez Suárez, 1927–2020) – Argentine actress and television personality, twin sister of Mirtha Legrand
- José A. Martínez Suárez (1925–2019) – Argentine film director, screenwriter and film producer, brother of the Legrand twins

== Economy ==
Villa Cañás has an economy centered on agriculture and tourism. The region is well-suited for soybean, wheat, corn, and sunflower cultivation, attracting grain storage facilities.

The local government supports economic development through microloans for entrepreneurs and business management training programs. Loans have also been provided for purchasing tools and production equipment.

Proximity tourism has received investments to improve public spaces, aiming to boost the local economy.

The land is suitable for cultivation of soybean, wheat, corn, and sunflower. For this reason, and due to rapid communication with the ports of Rosario and Bahía Blanca (via National Route 33), numerous grain companies have chosen to install their storage facilities in the area.

The business conglomerate MSU Argentina, founded by Manuel Santos Uribelarrea Balcarce, has been based in Villa Cañás since 1998. The company operates in the agricultural and energy sectors, cultivating over 220,000 hectares and producing more than 1.1 million tons of grain annually across Argentina, Brazil, and Paraguay.
