= Limay River =

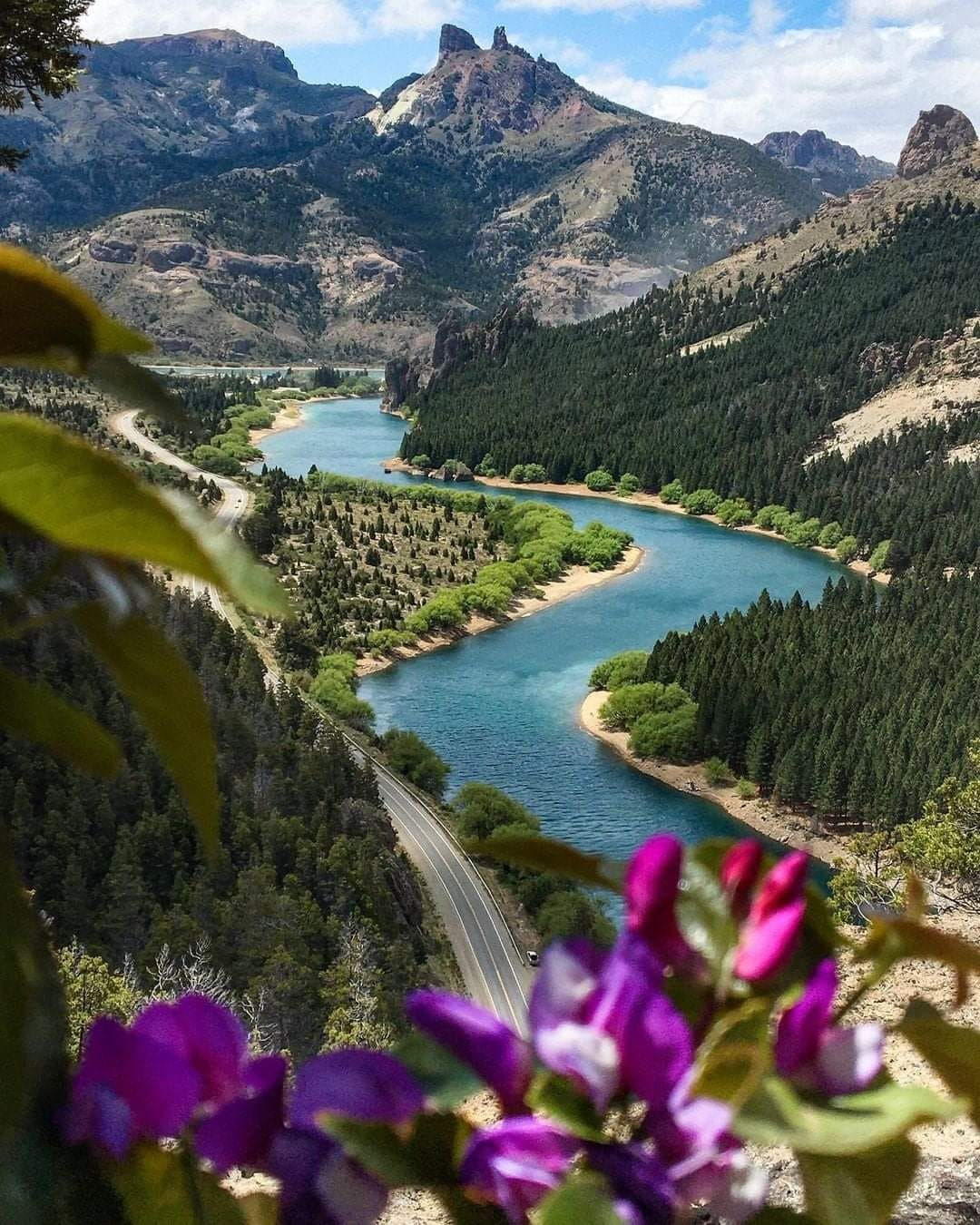
- Limay River within the Enchanted Valley section in the Río Negro province

Location
- Country: Argentina

Physical characteristics
- Source
  - location: Nahuel Huapi Lake
  - elevation: 770 m (2,530 ft) AMSL
- Mouth
  - location: into Río Negro
  - coordinates: 38°59′35″S 68°00′18″W
- Length: 380 km (240 mi)
- Basin size: 61,723 km^{2} (23,831 sq mi)
- Discharge
  - average: 700 m^{3}/s (25,000 cu ft/s)

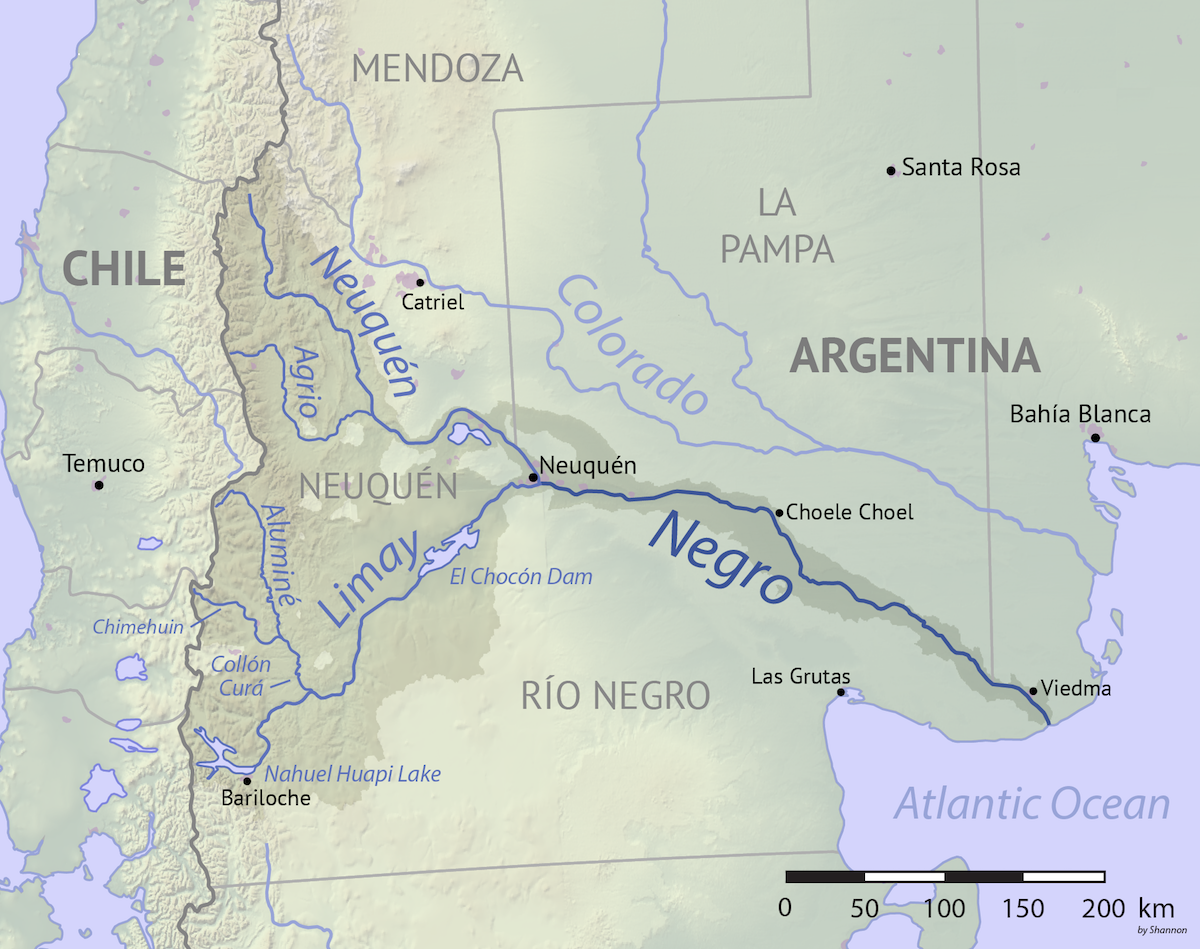
Map of the Río Negro drainage basin, including the Limay

The Limay River is an important river in the northwestern Argentine Patagonia (the region of Comahue). It originates at the eastern end of the Nahuel Huapi Lake and flows in a meandering path for about 380 kilometres (240 mi), collecting the waters of several tributaries, such as the Traful River, the Pichileufú and the Collón Curá. It then meets the Neuquén River and together they become the Río Negro. At this confluence lies the city of Neuquén.

The river serves as natural border between the provinces of Río Negro and Neuquén. Its deep waters are clear, and carry a large flow, 700 cubic metres per second (25,000 cu ft/s) on average. Its drainage basin has an area of 61,723 square kilometres (23,831 sq mi) and includes almost all the rivers and streams of the Atlantic basin in the region, as well as an extensive network of lakes.

The waters of the Limay are used to generate hydroelectricity at the five dams built on its course: Alicurá, Piedra del Águila, Pichi Picún Leufú, El Chocón, and Arroyito; together with the Cerros Colorados Complex on the Neuquén River they constitute more than one quarter of Argentina's total hydroelectric power generation. The construction of the successive dams and reservoirs has reduced the length of the river, which originally measured about 450 kilometres (280 mi). In the 1980s the only heavy water plant in South America was constructed next to the river at the town of Arroyito.

The river is also used for fly fishing; in some locations its banks are suitable as beach resorts, with facilities for camping.

It is the most popular river in Nahuel Huapi National Park for fly fishing. It originates in the East side of Nahuel Huapi lake. Lost in a typical steppe landscape with gin clear waters, big and deep pools, fast and strong currents and enormous fish, of course. Plentiful rainbow trout and brown trout, from 6 to 28 inches (and larger), live in the river.

Various islands in the floodplains of the lower course of the river have been urbanized.

The origin of the word comes from the Mapuche indians and it means, crystalline, that you could see to the bottom.

== Gallery ==
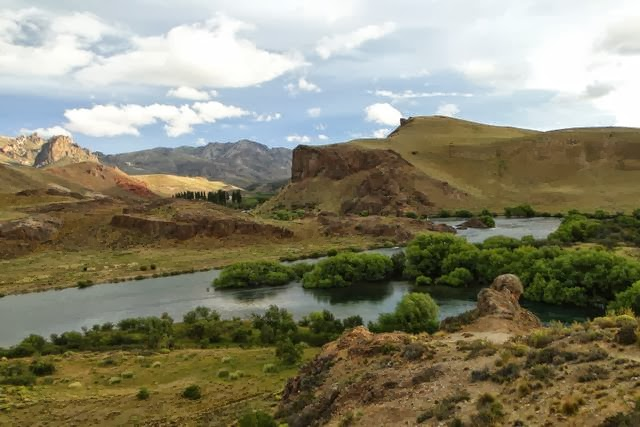

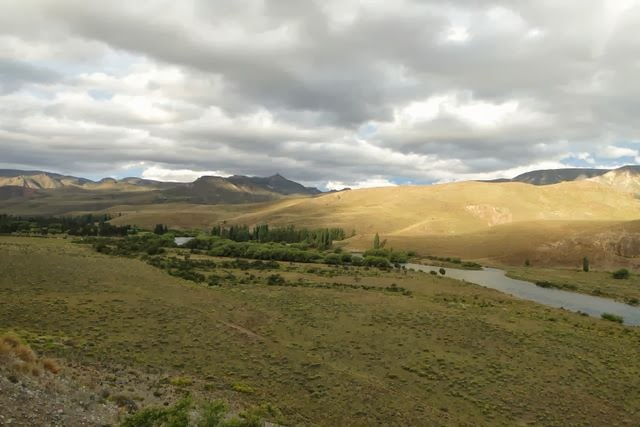

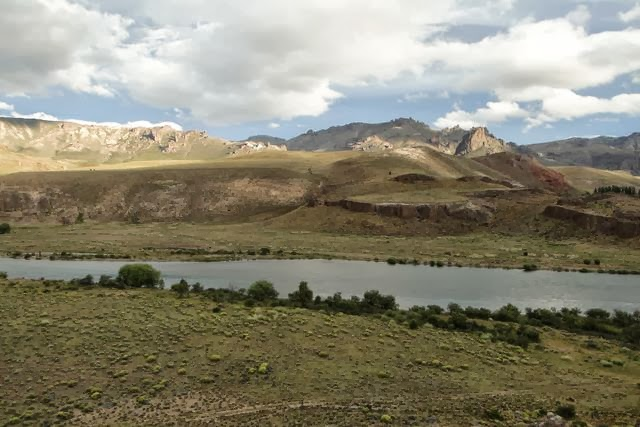

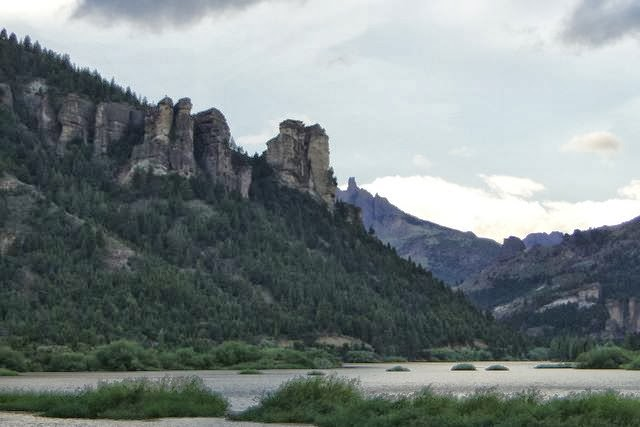
