= Manuel Santos Uribelarrea =

Argentine businessman (born 1978)

- Born: Manuel Santos Uribelarrea Balcarce; November 10, 1978 (age 47); Buenos Aires, Argentina
- Occupation: Businessman
- Years active: 1997–present
- Organization: MSU Group
- Known for: Founder and chief executive officer of MSU Group

Manuel Santos Uribelarrea Balcarce (born November 10, 1978) is an Argentine businessman, founder and chief executive officer of MSU Group, an Argentine conglomerate with operations in the agricultural, agroindustrial and energy sectors. The group expanded from agricultural production into thermal power generation and, later, renewable energy.

== Biography ==
Santos Uribelarrea was born in Buenos Aires on November 10, 1978. He is the son of Manuel Santos de Uribelarrea Duhau and Mercedes Balcarce Fernández Guerrico.

He is the fifth generation of the Uribelarrea family connected with agricultural activity in Argentina, a presence traced in business records to 1860. The broader history of Argentine rural landowning families of this period is documented by María Sáenz Quesada in her work on the estancieros from the colonial period to the present.

During his childhood he spent time in the rural area between Colón, Teodelina and Villa Cañás, where the family estate Santa Juana was located. He attended a rural school there and became involved in farm activities from an early age.

== Business career ==
=== MSU Agro ===
In 1997, together with his father, Santos Uribelarrea began the business that would become MSU Agro, based in Villa Cañás. The initial operation included about 15,000 hectares of farmland and 6,500 head of cattle on owned fields in southern Santa Fe and the centre-north of Buenos Aires province. Subsequent expansion relied mainly on leasing third-party farmland, a model that allowed the company to decentralise production while keeping administration centralised. This operating model was part of a broader transformation in the organisation of Argentine agricultural production following the expansion of commodity-oriented farming.

MSU Agro has been identified among the companies participating in the productive link of the Argentine Corn and Sorghum Association, MAIZAR, an organisation created to bring together actors in the maize and sorghum value chain.

In 2007, the group launched an international agricultural land investment vehicle, Santa Juana Ltd., with funding from European pension funds. In 2009, the Dutch pension fund Stichting Pensioenfonds ABP acquired a minority stake in the MSU Group. In September 2019, Santos Uribelarrea and his family bought back ABP's stake, returning the group to full family ownership.

In 2013, MSU accessed the capital markets through the issuance of negotiable obligations under the supervision of Argentina's National Securities Commission. In December 2016, the Boletín Oficial de la República Argentina published the incorporation notice of MSU Energy Gálvez S.A., listing Manuel Santos Uribelarrea as president and describing the company's corporate purpose as including electric power generation, including renewable and alternative sources.

In the period examined by a March 2023 report of the Instituto de Estudios y Formación of the CTA Autónoma, MSU Agro harvested 165,000 hectares—owned and leased—in Argentina. The company's annual balance sheet for June 2022 recorded profits of ARS 22.6 billion.

In 2024, Santos Uribelarrea announced the development of a peanut processing plant in southern Santa Fe, with an estimated investment of US$110 million.

=== MSU Energy ===
In 2016, Santos Uribelarrea diversified the group's activities into the energy sector through MSU Energy. The initial development plan included three thermal generation plants located in General Rojo, Barker and Villa María, designed to add about 750 MW to the Argentine electricity system and financed through international banks and suppliers. The thermal programme represented a combined-cycle investment of about US$1 billion.

By 2024, MSU's power generation portfolio included thermal and renewable assets. That year Santos Uribelarrea discussed the group's transition from agriculture to electricity generation at a business energy summit organised by La Nación, noting the limits imposed by transmission infrastructure for new renewable projects.

=== MSU Green Energy ===
In 2022, Santos Uribelarrea founded MSU Green Energy, the group's renewable energy company, with a projected investment plan of about US$650 million. The company developed utility-scale solar projects, including parks in provinces such as Chaco, La Rioja and Formosa. In August 2024, the Pampa del Infierno solar park in Chaco obtained commercial approval for 130 MW; the company projected investments of more than US$650 million to develop 665 MW across eleven solar parks.

By 2025, the group had added hydroelectric generation to its portfolio through a 30-year concession for the El Chocón hydroelectric plant, complementing its thermal and solar assets.

== Public profile ==
Santos Uribelarrea has participated in business, agricultural and energy forums in Argentina. In 2024, he spoke at an energy event organised by La Nación, where he discussed the group's expansion into electricity generation and the limits imposed by transmission infrastructure for new renewable projects.

That same year, Forbes Argentina included Manuel Santos Uribelarrea and his siblings in its list of the 50 wealthiest people in Argentina, estimating their combined wealth at US$550 million.

== See also ==
- Agriculture in Argentina
- Agribusiness
- Electricity sector in Argentina
- Renewable energy in Argentina
- Combined cycle
- Power purchase agreement
