= Comahue =

Sub-region of Argentina

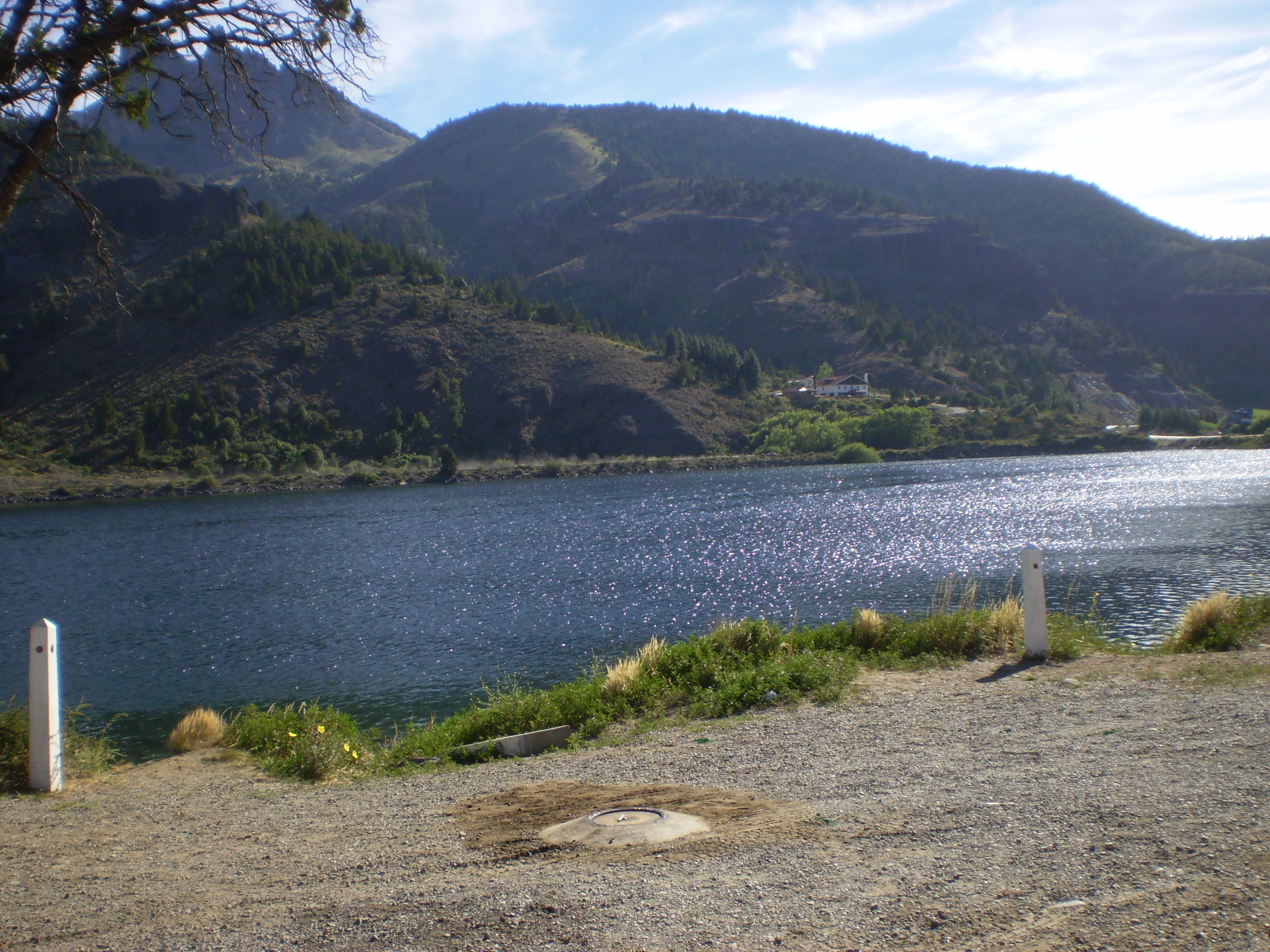
Traful River, Province of Neuquén

Comahue is a non-administrative sub-region of Argentina situated slightly to the south of the country's centre that covers the northern part of Argentinian Patagonia and includes the provinces of Neuquén and Río Negro. Some also include La Pampa Province and the Patagones Partido at the southern tip of Buenos Aires Province.

The region's social and economical centre is located at the point where the Limay and Neuquén rivers join to form the Río Negro. This fertile, orchard-lined area is known as the Alto Valle del Río Negro and the main cities in the zone are Neuquén (seat of the National University of Comahue) and General Roca.

== Etymology ==
Comahue is a word of Mapuche origin meaning 'place of abundance', or perhaps 'where the water hurt', referring to the valley.

== Climate ==
The climate in Comahue is rather changeable with its hydrological year starting in early autumn in Argentina and its peak is in June as well as in October with the snows breaks.
