= Needle Peak =

Needle Peak may refer to:

- Needle Peak (Antarctica)
- In Canada:
  - Needle Peak (Alberta)
  - Needle Peak (British Columbia)
- In the United States:
  - Needle Peak (Coronation Island), Alaska
  - Needle Peak (Arizona)
  - Needle Peak (Inyo County, California)
  - Needle Peak (Placer County, California)
  - Needle Peak (Bonneville County, Idaho)
  - Needle Peak (Shoshone County, Idaho)
  - Needle Peak (Montana)
  - Needle Peak (Nevada)
  - Needle Peak (Brewster County, Texas)
  - Needle Peak (Jeff Davis County, Texas)
  - Needle Peak (Presidio County, Texas)
  - Needle Peak (Washington)
  - Needle Peak (Wyoming)
