= Condor agate =

Agate variety from Argentina

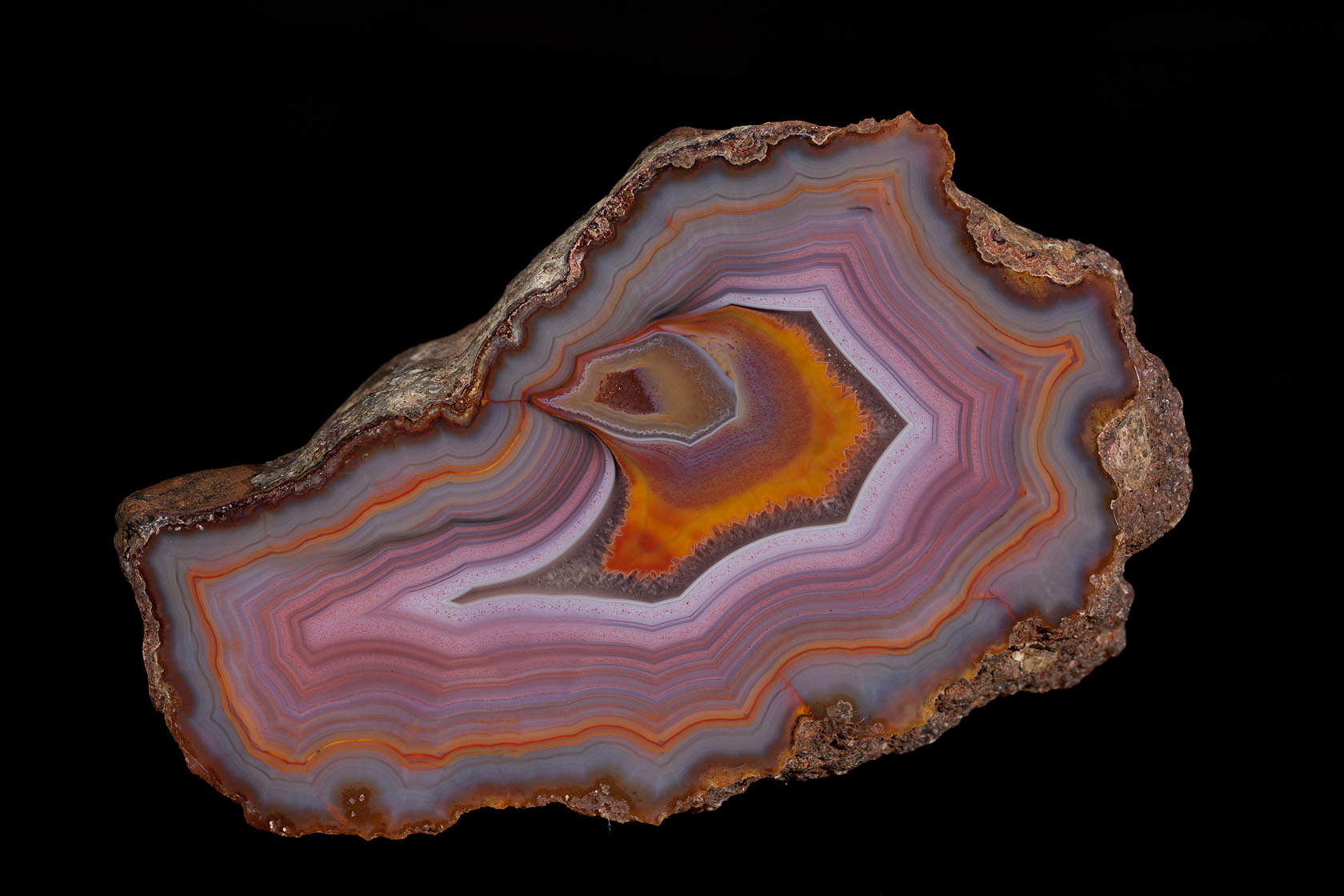
- A cut and polished piece of condor agate

General
- Category: Tectosilicate minerals
- Group: Quartz group
- Formula: SiO_{2} (silicon dioxide)
- IMA status: Variety of quartz (chalcedony)
- Crystal system: Trigonal (quartz) or monoclinic (moganite)

Identification
- Color: Red, yellow, orange, pink, gray, blue
- Crystal habit: Cryptocrystalline silica
- Cleavage: None
- Fracture: Conchoidal, subconchoidal
- Tenacity: Brittle
- Mohs scale hardness: 6.5–7
- Luster: Waxy, vitreous when polished
- Streak: White
- Diaphaneity: Translucent
- Specific gravity: 2.6
- Density: 2.6 g/cm³
- Optical properties: Uniaxial (+)
- Refractive index: 1.530–1.543
- Birefringence: Up to 0.004
- Pleochroism: Absent

Condor agate is a variety of agate found in the mountains near San Rafael, in Mendoza Province, Argentina. It was discovered and named by Luis de los Santos in 1993. Condor agate often exhibits brightly contrasted bands of red and yellow and may have inclusions of moss or sagenite. It has become a popular stone among collectors and jewelry designers.

== Mining ==
In the early days of condor agate collecting, a typical month of effort would yield 1 ton of good agates. Currently, excavation is required to find the agates, so an extra effort is needed to supply the ever growing demand for these gems. Initially, the agates were found scattered loose over the landscape and were readily harvested in quantity. Today, surface collecting is no longer prolific, so these agates are collected from shallow diggings in the cold agate fields in Mendoza province, Argentina.
