= Agua del Toro Dam =

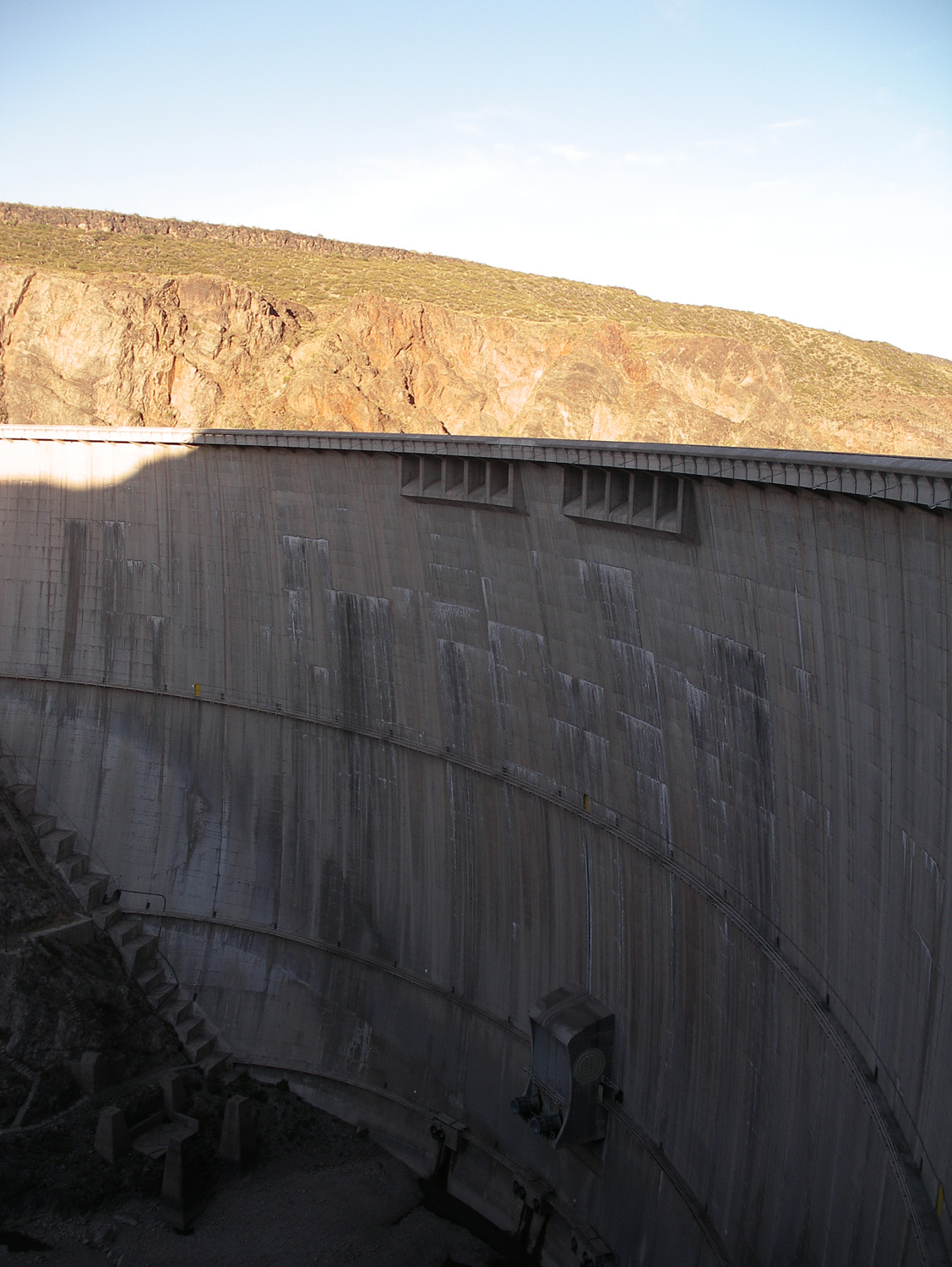
- Downstream face of the arch dam

- Location within Argentina
- Country: Argentina
- Location: San Rafael in Mendoza Province
- Coordinates: 34°35′2.45″S 69°2′10.31″W
- Purpose: Power, water supply
- Status: Operational
- Construction began: 1966
- Opening date: 1973; 53 years ago
- Owner: Hirdroeléctrica Diamante (HIDISA)/Hidroeléctrica de los Nihuiles (HINISA)

Dam and spillways
- Type of dam: Arch
- Impounds: Diamante River
- Height: 120 m (390 ft)
- Length: 309 m (1,014 ft)
- Width (crest): 4.6 m (15 ft)
- Width (base): 22.7 m (74 ft)
- Spillway capacity: 400 m^{3}/s (14,000 cu ft/s)

Reservoir
- Total capacity: 326,650,000 m^{3} (264,820 acre⋅ft)
- Active capacity: 268,700,000 m^{3} (217,800 acre⋅ft)
- Catchment area: 3,790 km^{2} (1,460 sq mi)
- Surface area: 10.8 km^{2} (4.2 sq mi)

Agua del Toro Hydroelectric Station
- Coordinates: 34°34′46.06″S 68°59′22.21″W
- Commission date: 1982
- Turbines: 2 x 75 MW (101,000 hp) Francis-type
- Installed capacity: 150 MW (200,000 hp)

The Agua del Toro Dam is an arch dam on the Diamante River about 63 kilometres (39 mi) west of San Rafael in Mendoza Province, Argentina. The primary purpose of the dam is hydroelectric power generation and it supports a 150 megawatts (200,000 hp) power station located downstream. Construction on the dam began in 1966, and it was completed in 1973. The power station was started the same year and commissioned in 1982. The dam and power station is part of the Rio Diamante System which is owned jointly by Hidroeléctrica Diamante (HIDISA) and Hidroeléctrica de los Nihuiles (HINISA).

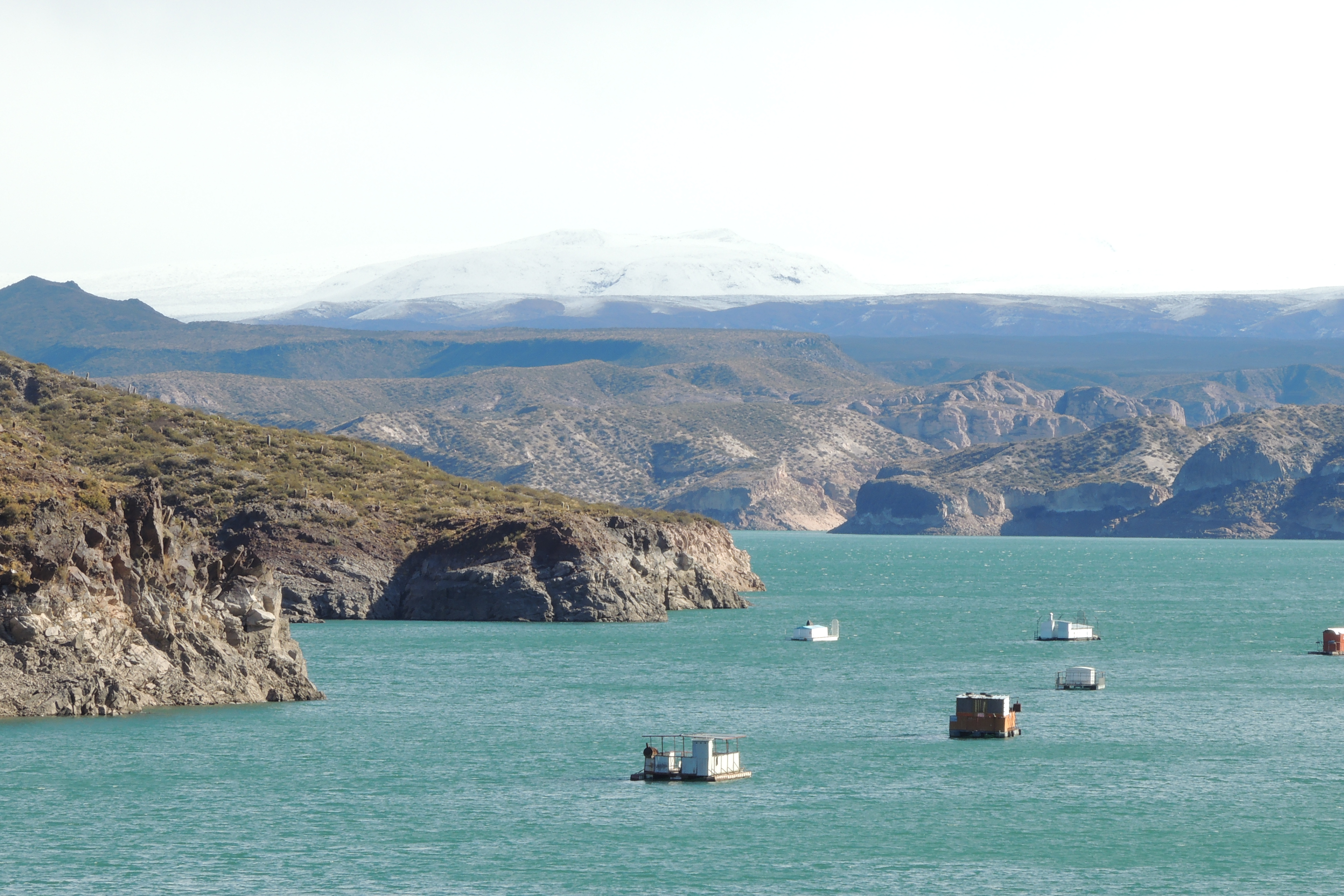
Lake with Andes background, 2015
