= The Toy Shop =

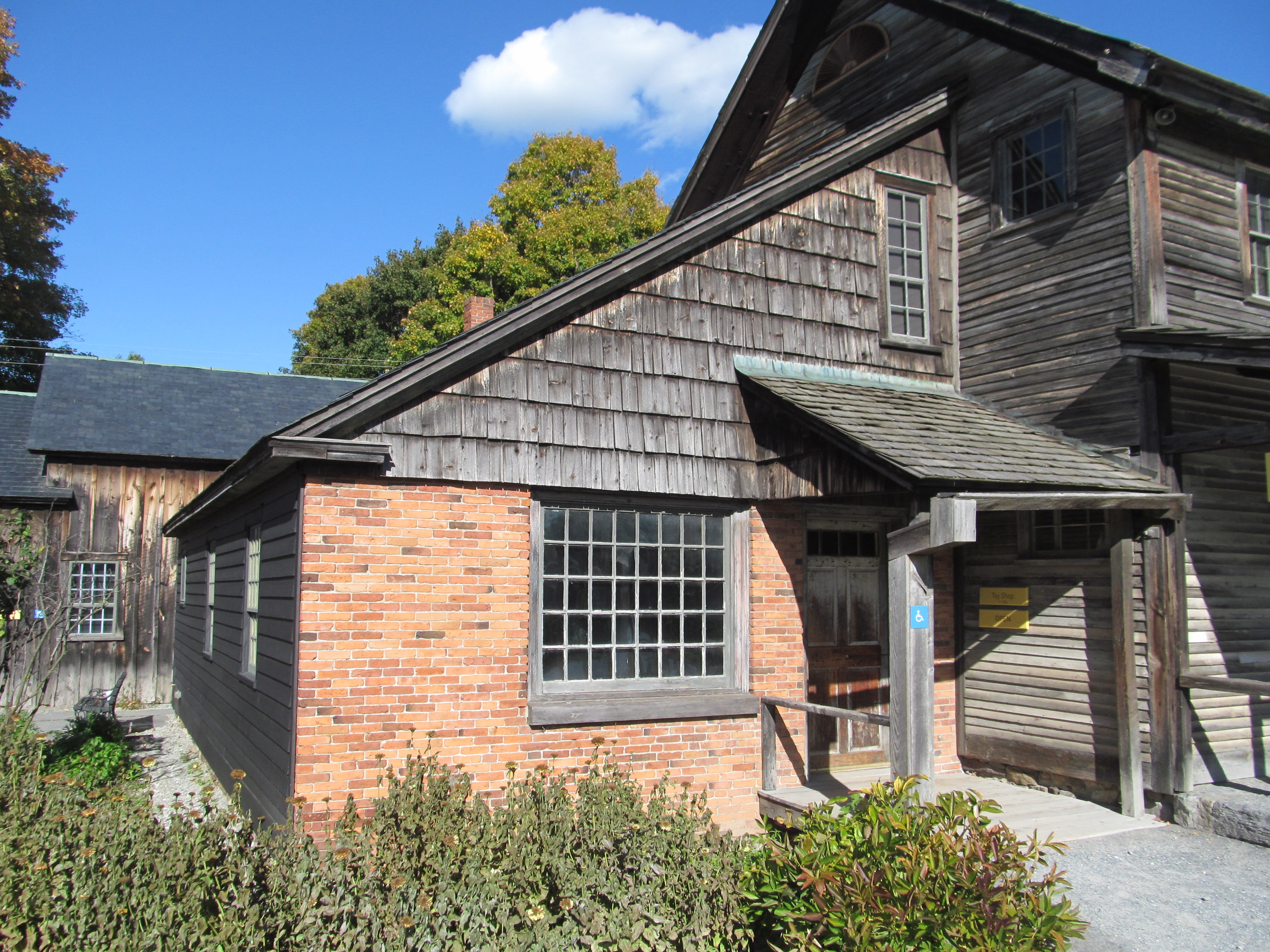
- The Toy Shop

General information
- Location: Shelburne, Vermont
- Coordinates: 44°22′39.95″N 73°13′45.38″W

The Toy Shop is an exhibit building at Shelburne Museum, which is located in Shelburne, Vermont. Toy Shop houses 19th- and early 20th-century playthings, including miniature transportation toys, penny banks, and music boxes.

== History ==
The Shelburne Museum built the Toy Shop in the early 1950s as an extension to Variety Unit. Built in 1835, Variety Unit, the only structure original to the Museum grounds, is an example of “continuous” architecture common to New England farmhouses. As more space was needed, farmers added new wings to their house. Farmers would merge farm and household buildings in one continuous structure that not only kept everything centralized but, also made it unnecessary to go outside in inclement weather. Built onto the rear of Variety Unit, the Toy Shop extends this tradition.

== Collection ==
The impulse to play is universal, and throughout human history people not immediately preoccupied with survival have created playthings. Toys of earlier eras offer important clues to the lives of their makers and owners.

Shelburne Museum’s collection of toys, which includes both European and American examples from the early nineteenth century through the first decades of the twentieth century, encompasses a broad range of both handmade and manufactured examples.

Simple toys, both homemade and commercially produced, such as clay or glass marbles and cloth, wood, leather, or rubber balls, were widely available for purchase and would often reappear in new materials as manufacturing technology improved. Educational games, that began to appear in the late eighteenth century, document the skills and subjects that children were expected to master. The abundance of commercially produced American and European toys that appeared throughout the nineteenth century attests to technological advances and to changing perceptions of childhood and leisure.

Colonial American toys included those of European manufacture as well as homemade examples. Cottage industries on both continents produced wooden blocks, hobby and rocking horses, puppets, dolls, and other simple toys of paper, cloth, wood, and metal. After the Civil War, Americans developed increasingly efficient ways to manufacture playthings and quickly emerged as leaders in the manufacture of cast-iron banks; miniature boats and wagons of tin, cast iron, or wood; and lithographed optical toys and board games.

Although the United States dominated commercial toy manufacturing by 1900, individuals continued to make playthings by hand for a variety of reasons. Some toys, like whistles made from spring willow twigs or dandelion stems, simply could not be commercially produced. While those who could not afford store-bought toys often created homemade toys, even the affluent sometimes chose to carve a miniature cradle or a hobby horse, or to stitch a doll dress or a puppet as a special gift. Children also enjoy making toys and the nineteenth century saw an emergence of pattern books and instructional magazines for their use.

== See also ==
- Shelburne Museum
- Variety Unit
- Toy store
- Toy
