= Needle Peak (Brewster County, Texas) =

Mountain in Texas, United States

Coordinates: 29.4282178°N 103.8102453°W

Needle Peak is the local nickname for the Sierra Aguja in Brewster County, Texas, a small range near the Mexican border and just west of Big Bend National Park. Not to be confused with Needle Peak in Presidio County, Texas, about 17 miles away.

The Needle Peak slopes in Brewster County are noted as a source of quartz crystals, including green moss agate, botryoidal geodes, Needle Peak sagenite, and pompom agates.
