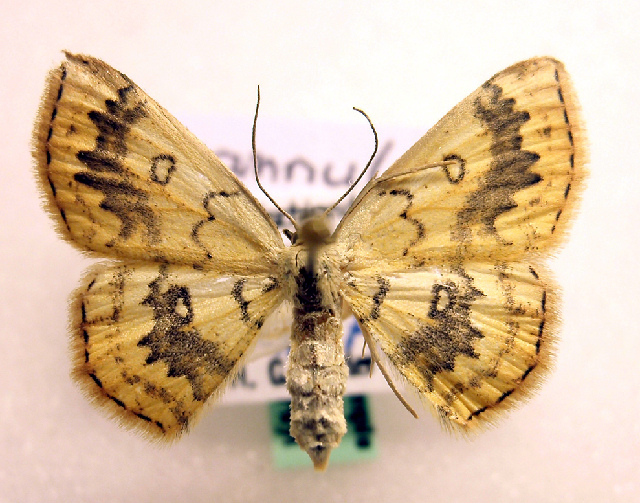

Scientific classification
- Kingdom: Animalia
- Phylum: Arthropoda
- Clade: Pancrustacea
- Class: Insecta
- Order: Lepidoptera
- Family: Geometridae
- Genus: Cyclophora
- Species: C. annularia

Binomial name
- Cyclophora annularia (Fabricius, 1775)

Synonyms
- Phalaena annularia Fabricius, 1775; Phalaena annulata Schulze, 1775; Cyclophora annulata; Phalaena circulifera Fourcroy, 1785; Phalaena denticulata Thunberg, 1788; Geometra omicronaria Denis & Schiffermüller, 1775

= Cyclophora annularia =

Species of moth

Cyclophora annularia, the mocha, is a moth of the family Geometridae. The species was first described by Johan Christian Fabricius in 1775 and it can be found in Europe.

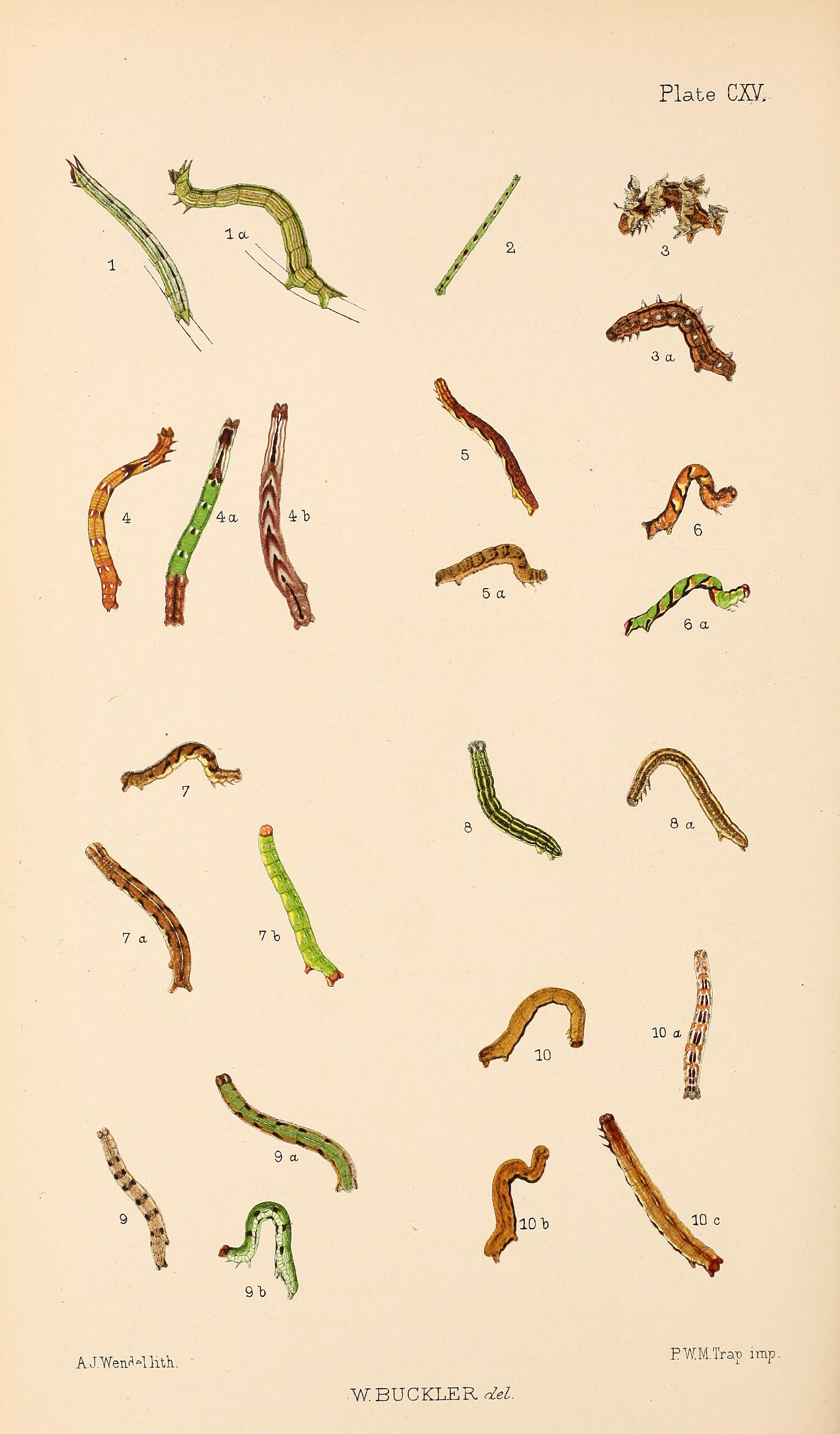
Figs.Fig 8,8a Larva after final moult

Its wingspan is 18 to 22 millimetres (0.71 to 0.87 in). Normally, the wings of this species are yellowish white, inclining to ochreous yellow with the blackish central shade near to and sometimes united with the blackish irregular and outwardly toothed second cross line on both fore and hind wings. The rings are deep brown or blackish. There is variation in the width and intensity of the central shade, and the rings sometimes are absent on the fore wings (ab. obsoleta, Riding), and occasionally all the wings are devoid of the annular mark (ab. biobsoleta, Riding). Examples of a second generation reared in captivity are rather deeper coloured, and have a sprinkling of black scales, chiefly on the fore wings.

The caterpillar is dark green, yellow between the rings; there are three yellow lines along the back, the outer ones waved. The head is reddish brown, paler marked. There is also a pale ochreous brown form.

Adults are on wing from May to August depending on the location. The larvae feed on maple tree leaves.

The name derives from a fancied resemblance to the Mocha stone.
