= Real del Padre =

- City
- Location of Real del Padre in Argentina
- Coordinates: 34°50′25″S 67°45′58″W
- Country: Argentina
- Province: Mendoza
- Department: San Rafael
- Elevation: 497 m (1,631 ft)

Population
  - Total: 6,350
- Time zone: UTC−3 (ART)
- CPA base: M5624
- Dialing code: +54 2625
- Climate: BWk

Real del Padre is a town and district in San Rafael Department, Mendoza Province, Argentina, located to the east of San Rafael city, just in the border to General Alvear Department.

The town has a population about 6.000 inhabits.

Agricultural areas with fruit trees, vineyards and wineries are the main activities.

A big factory of tinned fruits is established in the town.
