= Needle Peak (Presidio County, Texas) =

Mountain in Texas, United States

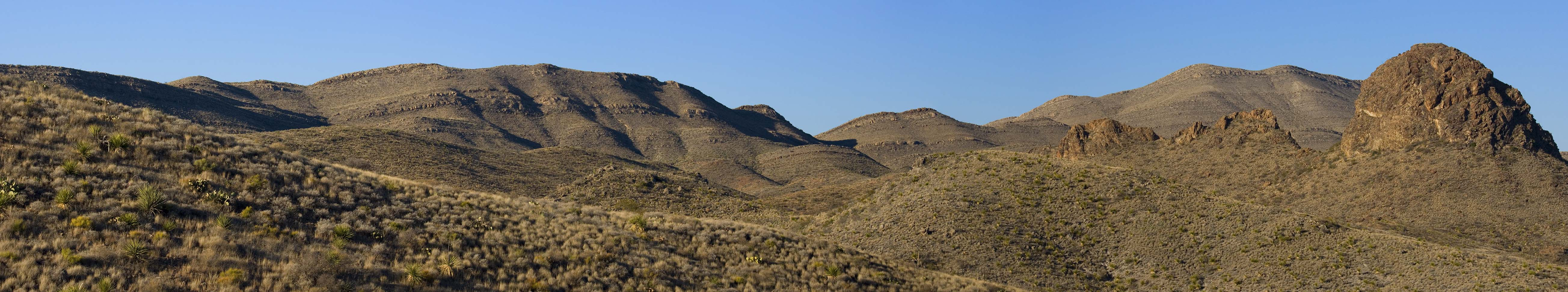
- Needle Peak at far right

Highest point
- Elevation: 4,608 ft (1,405 m)
- Prominence: 821 ft (250 m)
- Parent peak: The Solitario
- Coordinates: 29°25′42″N 103°48′37″W

Geography
- Location within Texas
- Location: Presidio County, Texas, U.S.
- Topo map: USGS The Solitario

Needle Peak is located in Presidio County, in southwest Texas, United States. Its summit, at an elevation of 4,608 feet (1,405 m) above sea level, rises 328 ft (100 m) over the Lower Shutup, a canyon that runs along its eastern edge. Needle Peak is a Tertiary intrusion and stands within the Solitario, a circular domal uplift with a nine-mile diameter and a prominent limestone rim. The area is desert mountain terrain of basalt deposits. The vegetation consists primarily of sparse grasses, cacti, desert shrubs, and scrub brush. Needle Peak was named for its configuration.

Locally, the name Needle Peak is also used to refer to another nearby location, Needle Peak (Brewster County, Texas), the small Sierra Aguja range, which is about 17 miles southeast of Needle Peak in Presidio County. The slopes of this range are noted as a source of quartz crystals, including green moss agate, botryoidal geodes, Needle Peak sagenite, and pompon agates.
