= Mocha decorated pottery =

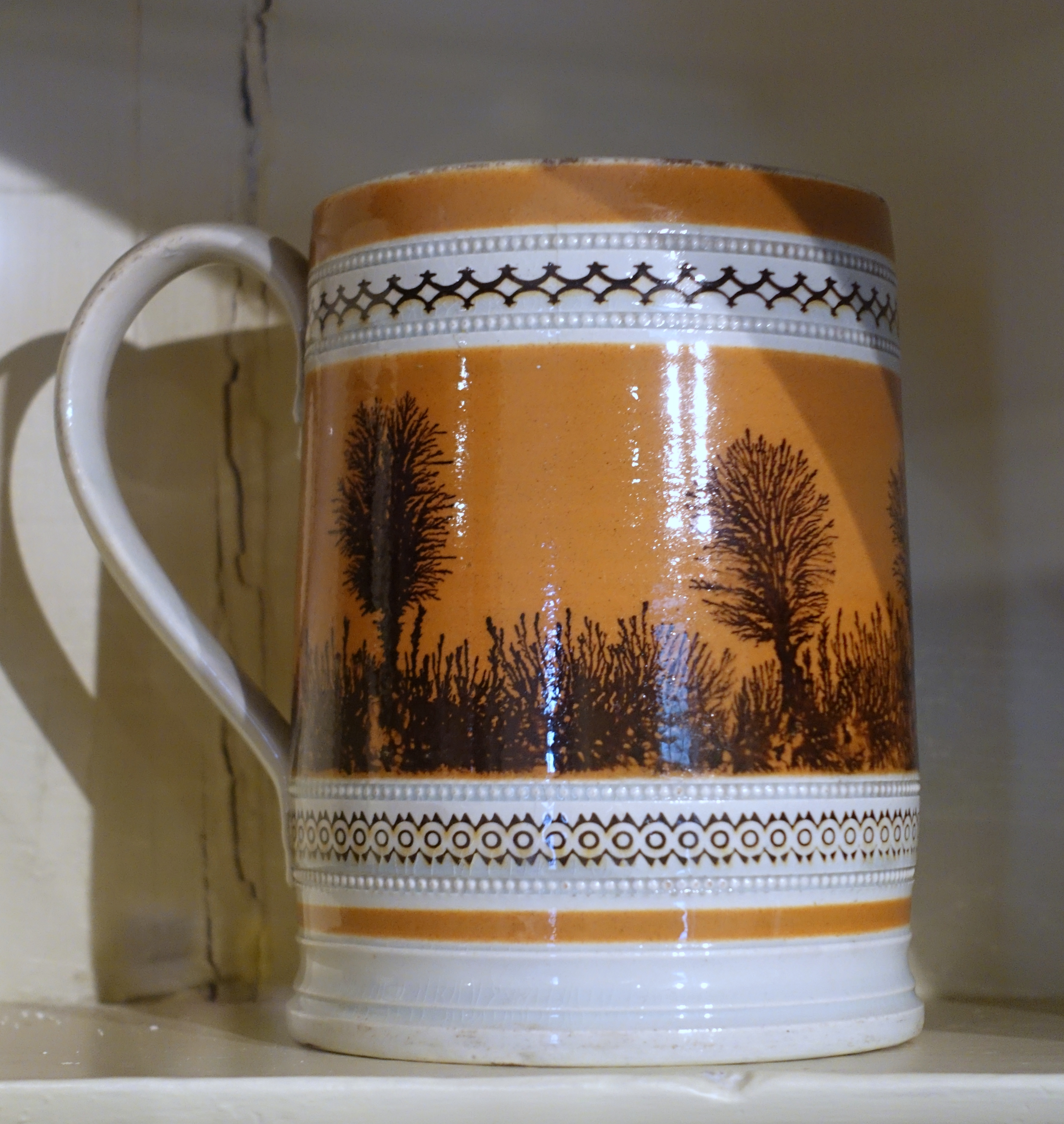
Mug with mocha decoration, England, c. 1800, earthenware

Mocha decorated pottery (made by a technique known as the Mocha Tea technique) is a type of dipped ware (slip-decorated, lathe-turned, utilitarian earthenware), mocha or mochaware, in addition to colored slip bands on white and buff-colored bodies, is adorned with dendritic (tree-like or branching) markings resembling the natural geological markings on moss agate, known as "mocha stone" in Great Britain in the late 18th century. The stone was imported from Arabia through the port of Mokha from whence came large supplies of coffee. An unknown potter or turner discovered that by dripping a colored acidic solution into wet alkaline slip on a pot body, the color would instantly ramify into the dendritic random markings that fit into the tradition of imitating geological surfaces prevalent in the potteries of that period. The earliest known dated example (1799) is a mug in the collection of the Christchurch Mansion Museum in Ipswich, England. Archaeological excavations of the wreck of HMS Nymphe in Road Town Harbor on Tortuga in the British West Indies produced sherds of two earthenware vessels with dendritic markings on slip marbled surfaces. The sloop was accidentally burned and sunk in 1783, giving an earlier date for this technique provided the sherds are from that wreck. The context appears to support that supposition. Archival references are known that mention "mocoe beakers" as early as 1792.

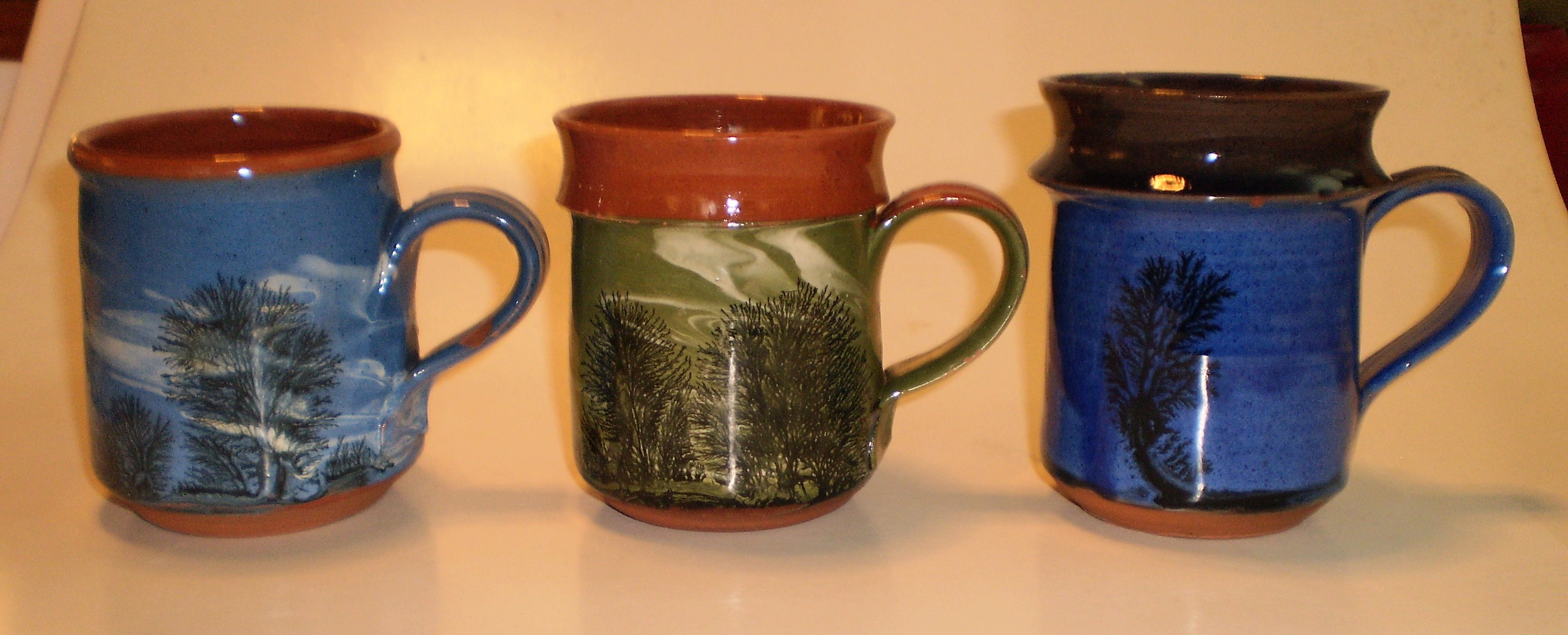
Three Mochaware decorated mugs from the Boscastle pottery, c. 1975

Manufactured by potteries throughout Great Britain, France, and North America, mocha was the cheapest decorated ware available. Most British production went to export whereas France and North America manufactured for the home markets. Archaeological finds throughout the eastern United States suggest that mocha was used in taverns and homes, from lowly slave quarters to Thomas Jefferson's Monticello and Poplar Forest. After the mid 19th century, British imports waned, with those potteries still making mocha concentrating on government-stamped capacity-verified measures (jugs and mugs) for use in pubs and markets. North American product was based entirely on yellow or buff-colored bodies banded in black with broad white slip bands on which the dendritic markings appeared. Some British makers used yellow-firing clay, too, but the bulk of the wares were based on white bodies, the earliest being creamware and pearlware, while later, heavier and thicker bodies resembled ironstone, known best to archaeologists simply as "whiteware".
