= San Rafael Department =

San Rafael Departamento San Rafael
- Department
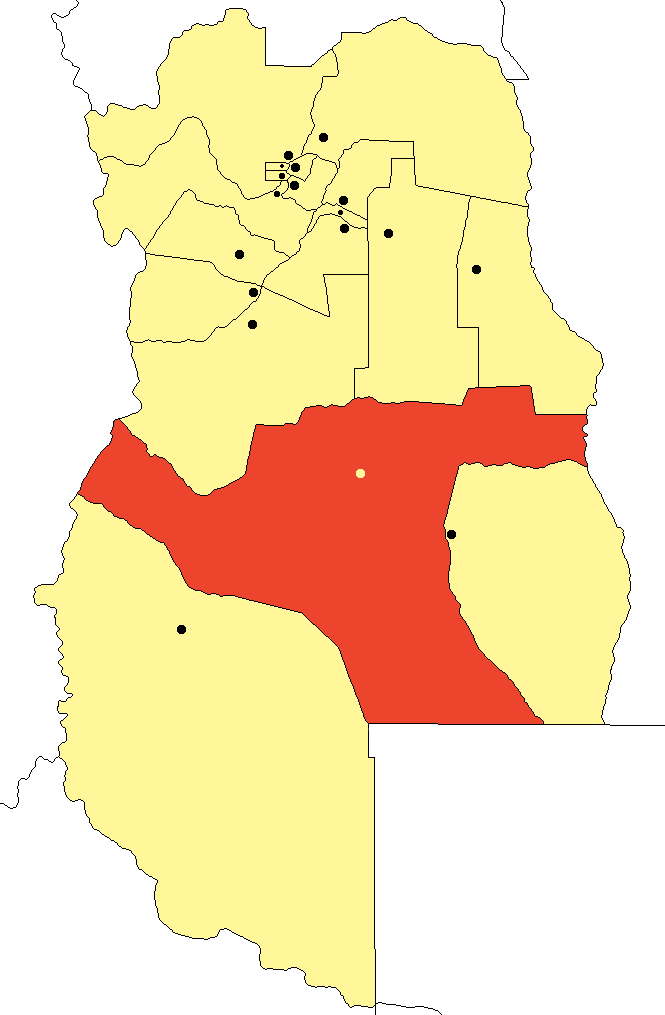
- location of in Mendoza Province
- Coordinates: 34°37′S 68°19′W
- Country: Argentina
- Established: April 2, 1805
- Founder: Miguel Télez Menezes
- Seat: San Rafael

Government
  - Intendant: Omar Chafí Félix (PJ)

Area
  - Total: 31,235 km^{2} (12,060 sq mi)

Population (2022 census [INDEC])
  - Total: 215,020
  - Density: 6.8839/km^{2} (17.829/sq mi)
- Demonym: sanrafaelina/o
- Postal Code: M5600
- IFAM: MZA015
- Area Code: 02627
- Patron saint: San Rafael Arcángel
- Website: www.sanrafael.gov.ar

San Rafael is one of the departments of Mendoza Province, Argentina. The seat of the department is in the city of San Rafael.

== Statistics ==
- Geographical location: 34° 15´ to 36° southern latitude and 70° 10´ to 66° 55´ eastern longitude.
- Area: 31,235 km^{2} (20.82% of the provincial area)
- Extension: 204 km from north to south. 298 km from east to west
- Altitude: 750 m above sea level.

== Neighboring departments ==
- North: San Carlos Department, Santa Rosa Department, Mendoza and La Paz Department, Mendoza
- East: San Luis Province and General Alvear Department
- South: La Pampa Province and Malargüe Department
- West: Chile.

== Administration ==
The department is subdivided in 18 districts: Ciudad, El Cerrito, Cuadro Nacional, Las Malvinas District, El Sosneado, Las Paredes, La Llave, Cuadro Benegas, Cuadro Nacional, Cañada Seca, Goudge, Jaime Prats, Monte Comán, Rama Caída, Real del Padre, Punta del Agua, Villa Atuel and Villa 25 de Mayo.
