= Variety Unit =

Coordinates: 44°22′39.81″N 73°13′44.37″W

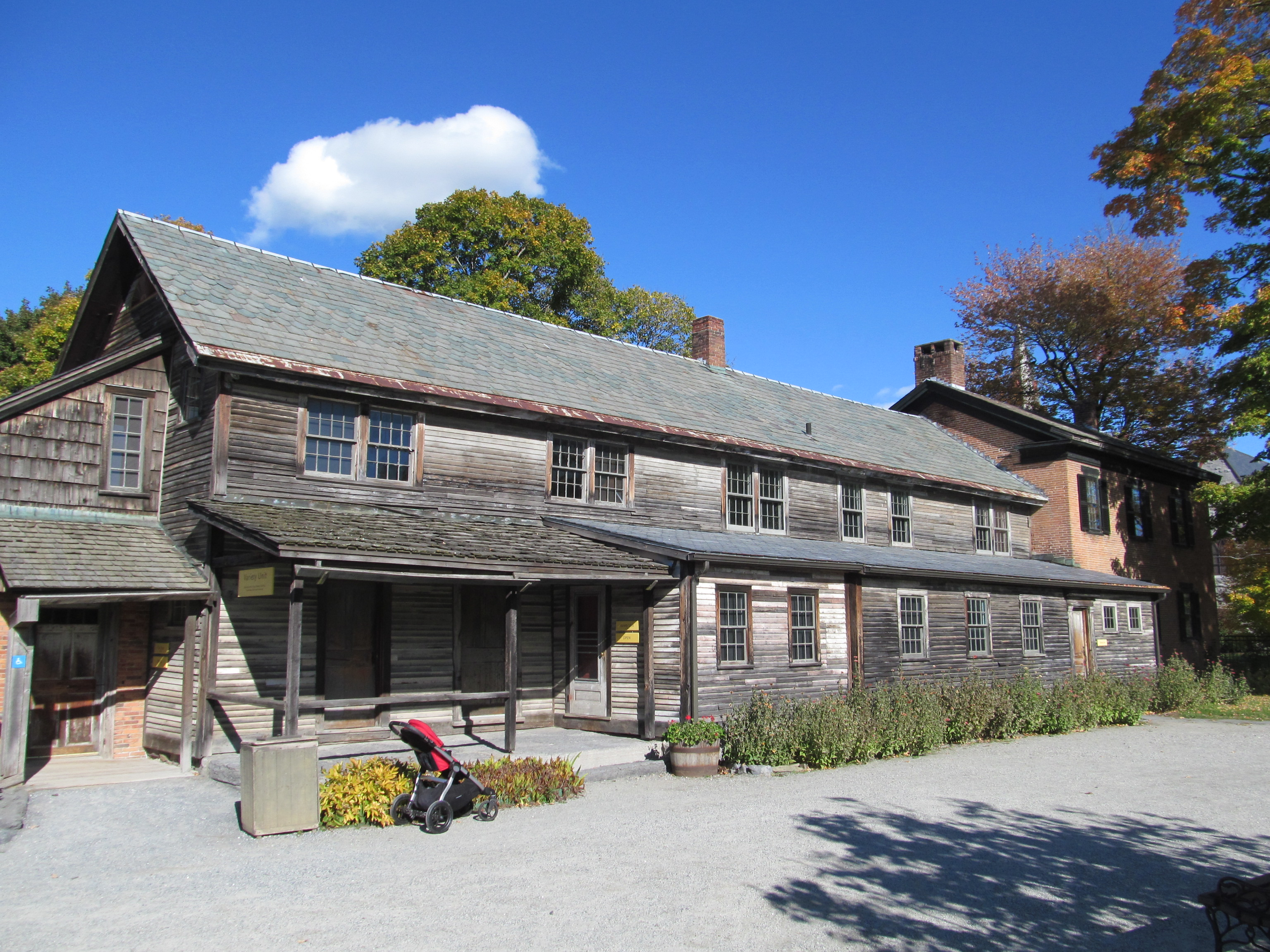
Variety Unit

Variety Unit is an exhibit building at Shelburne Museum in Shelburne, Vermont.

== History ==
Variety Unit is the only structure at Shelburne Museum that is original to the site. Built in 1835, the building was originally known as the Weed House, but was renamed Variety Unit to reflect the wide range of decorative arts exhibited there.

== Architecture ==
The original brick structure, with its front-gable orientation and fully articulated pediment, reflects the style of Greek Revival architecture popular in the mid-19th century. However, the complex rambling interior composed of a series of one and two-room additions, constructed over time as the occupants required more space, embodies the New England tradition of "continuous architecture."

== Variety Unit collections ==
=== Glass ===
Shelburne Museum's glass collection numbers nearly two thousand pieces dating from 1750 to 1900 and includes free-blown flasks, window glass, and mold-blown bottles and flasks; pattern glass plates, serving dishes and decorative piecesl colorful canes, rolling pins, marbles, "witch balls" and other whimseys; and miniature glass doll dishes. The Garrison collection of American pattern glass goblets includes eleven hundred patterns. In addition the collection includes a wide range of patent medicine and apothecary bottles.

=== Ceramics ===
The finest ceramics in the Museum's collection include over 200 pieces of 19th-century English mochaware, several of which are recent acquisitions. While the strength of the Shelburne Museum's collection is in utilitarian and fine tablewares, the figural ceramics are also of interest. Staffordshire animal figures, whimsical toby jugs, and a magnificent pair of Chelsea swans can also be seen in the Variety Unit.

=== Dolls and Dollhouses ===
Shelburne Museum's European and American dolls include bisque, papier-mâché, Parian, china, wax, wood and cloth pieces, most of them made between 1760 and 1930. About 400 dolls are on exhibition in Variety Unit in galleries re-designed in 2004 with new lighting and exhibition labels.

Exhibited with the dolls are 19th and 20th-century dollhouses; they include an English Gothic Revival house and the idiosyncratic Ramshackle Inn, a rambling American house with an artist's studio in the attic.

Many American dolls of the 18th and 19th centuries were made at home of readily available materials, including wood, rags, clay, dried apples, corn husks, bottles and clay pipes. Until World War I, the majority of dolls sold in America were imported from England, France, and Germany. Joel Ellis of Springfield, Vermont made some of the first commercial American dolls with wooden bodies, patented jointed limbs, and pewter hands and feet. Izannah Walker of Rhode Island made cloth dolls with hand-painted faces and hair. Examples by both Ellis and Walker can be seen in the Variety Unit.

Not all dolls were playthings. In the late 19th century French dollmakers such as Bru, Jumeau, and Steiner, and German dollmakers such as Kestner and Simon & Halbig – all represented in Shelburne Museum's collection – created elegant bisque-head dolls with large wide glass eyes, thick eyebrows, long lashes, cupid's bow lips, beautifully coiffed real hair and elaborate dresses of silk and other fine fabrics.

Souvenir and keepsake dolls were popular products in many areas frequented by tourists. Dolls created entirely of different sizes and shapes of shells, for example, come from a number of French and English resort towns; a number of these fragile dolls may be seen in the Hat and Fragrance. English peddler dolls, which depict street vendors and their diverse wares, and American Indian dolls, complete with bead-decorated costumes are also represented in Shelburne's vast collection.

=== Pewter ===
Shelburne Museum's pewter collection offers an overview of French, German, Dutch, English, and American styles. Settlers brought pieces of pewter with them from abroad and many American merchants sold foreign pewter in their shops. It cost less than other metals, and in Europe its styles frequently copied popular silver designs. American artisans often relied on imported English and German pewter for stylistic inspiration. In fact, long after pewter had fallen out of fashion in Europe it was still being widely produced in America.

=== Scrimshaw ===
The American whaling industry dominated the world market in the nineteenth century. It peaked in 1850 when seven hundred American ships with over twenty thousand men sailed from the South Pacific to the Arctic in search of whales. Voyages could last up to five years because ships only returned when their holds were filled with barrels of whale oil. To pass the time, some sailors used the leftover whalebone to make homecoming gifts for their friends and loved ones. With saws and files they would first shape the whalebone. Then with needles or knives they would sketch designs into the surface. When the design was complete the sailors would ink them with lampblack or squid ink.

While the best-known form of scrimshaw is the whale tooth decorated with engraved scenes, scrimshanders also fashioned shipboard tools, kitchen implements, domestic and needlework tools, and fashion accessories from whalebone and ivory. Tortoise shell, seashells, animal horn, pewter, silver, and exotic tropical woods gathered during the whaling journeys sometimes provided decorative accents.

Shelburne Museum's scrimshaw collection offers a broad range of forms. A variety of teeth are decorated with whaling scenes, portraits, and patriotic motifs. A "Susan's tooth," one of a handful engraved in the 1830s by Frederick Myrick aboard the ship Susan, is among the earliest documented scrimshaw in existence.

Pieces intended as gifts to wives and sweethearts included corset busks (inserted in a slit at the front of a woman's corset to firm the bodice), small picks (used to pierce holes in cloth or as hair decorations), pie crimpers, knitting needles, a butter print, a sewing box, and a yarn-winding swift.

=== Automata ===
Automata are large (sometimes three feet tall), often comical wind-up toys with accompanying music that were displayed in parlors, especially in France, in the late-19th and early 20th centuries. The Museum exhibits about 30 automata, including several particularly fine pieces by Gustave Vichy of Paris, France. The collection includes a drunken chef, a magician, a monkey drummer, a magician, an opium smoker, a woman at her toilette, and a clown walking on his hands.

=== Woodenware and food molds ===
North America's abundant forests supplied the raw materials that settlers used to create buildings and objects that ranged from baskets, barrels, and bowls, to carriages and boats.

Household utensils, known as treen, comprised some of the most basic and common wooden objects. One of the most popular materials used to create treen were burls, which are dense, hard growths that form on tree trunks. The semi-circular burls typically required little shaping to form bowls and in addition to their strength, they often possessed highly patterned and attractive grains. Craftsmen would scoop out the interior of a burl by hand or, in later years with a lathe, to create a hollowed bowl.

During the 19th century food molds became popular as a vehicle for both identification and decoration. Confectioners would use intricately carved wooden molds to form and decorate pastries and marzipan candies while bakers would pour their cake batters into carved molds such as the Museum's George Washington cake mold made by John Conger, a renowned New York carver. Dairy farmers would likewise use ornamental, circular stamps to mark their butter with their brand.

=== Other ===
The Variety Unit is also home to the glass canes, globlets, toby jugs, and trivets.

== See also ==
- Shelburne Museum
- Toy store
