= Los Reyunos Dam =

Dam in San Rafael, Mendoza, Argentina

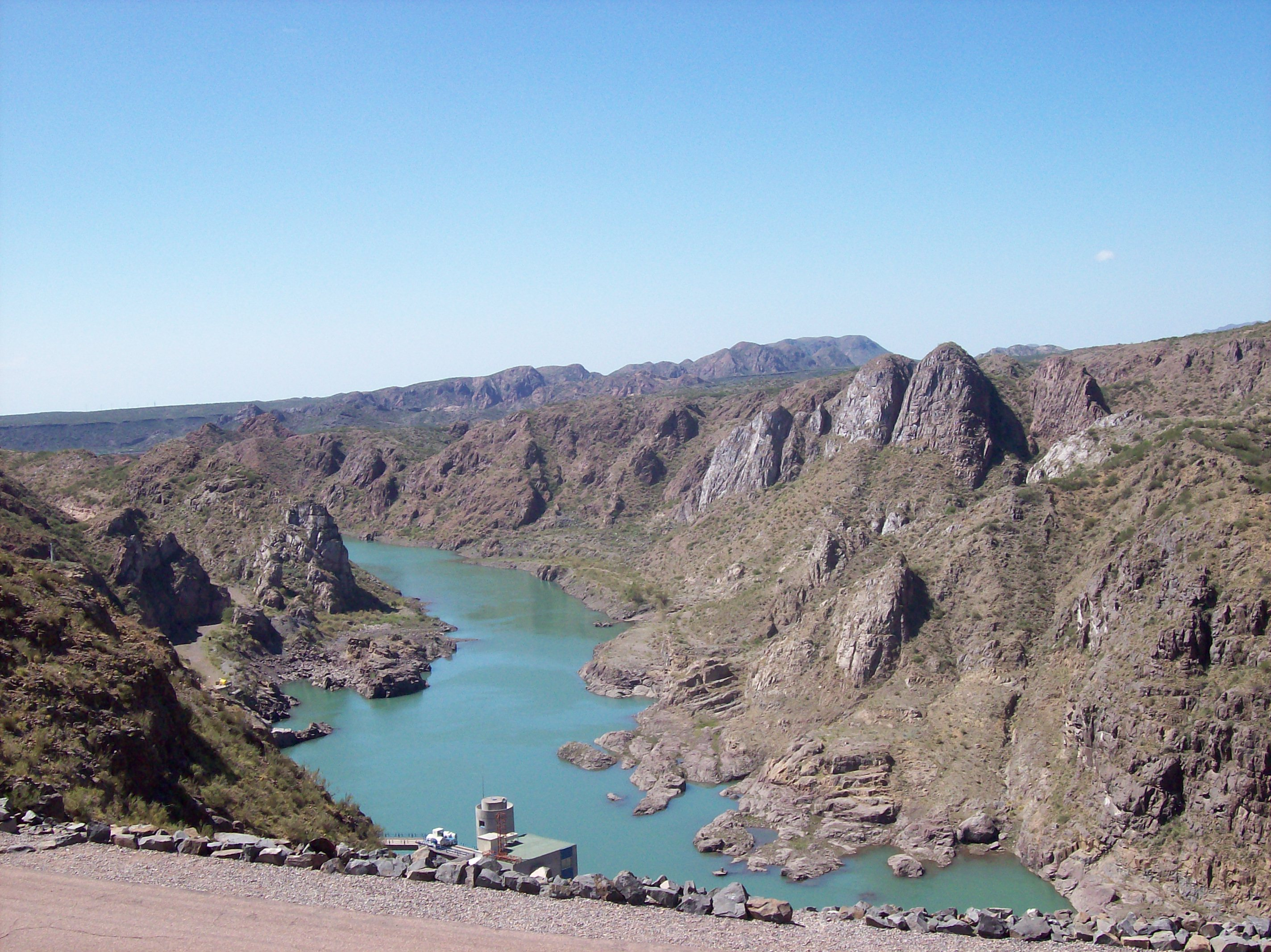
- View from atop the dam

- Location within Argentina
- Country: Argentina
- Location: San Rafael, Mendoza Province
- Coordinates: 34°36′8.45″S 68°38′30.06″W
- Purpose: Power, water supply
- Status: Operational
- Opening date: 1983; 43 years ago
- Owner: Hirdroeléctrica Diamante (HIDISA)/Hidroeléctrica de los Nihuiles (HINISA)

Dam and spillways
- Type of dam: Embankment
- Impounds: Diamante River
- Height: 136 m (446 ft)
- Length: 295 m (968 ft)

Reservoir
- Total capacity: 258,570,000 m^{3} (209,630 acre⋅ft)
- Active capacity: 137,280,000 m^{3} (111,290 acre⋅ft)
- Surface area: 7.34 km^{2} (2.83 mi^{2})

Power Station
- Commission date: 1983
- Type: Pumped-storage
- Turbines: 2 x 112 MW reversible Francis-type
- Installed capacity: 224 MW

The Los Reyunos Dam is an embankment dam on the Diamante River, in central Mendoza Province, Argentina, some twenty-two miles (thirty-five kilometers) from the city of San Rafael. The dam, built of stone and compacted clay to minimize execution and cost, is 440 feet (130 meters) high and contains a reservoir covering an area of 1,828 acres (7.40 km^{2}).

The dam is used to generate hydroelectricity. This is done with a pumped-storage power station located below the level of the reservoir. About one mile (two kilometer) downstream is a smaller, compensation dam, which forms the lower reservoir, called El Tigre. During the hours of decreased power demand, water is pumped from the reservoir of El Tigre back into Los Reyunos to stabilize the water level.

The reservoir is employed in raising Salmonidae and silverside, allowing for sport fishing. Los Reyunos Fishing and Nautical Club, along with private summer residences and a hotel, lies on the western shore of the reservoir and serves as a base for activities in the lake (such as windsurf, canoeing) and in the surrounding mountains (such as hiking).
