= Diamante River =

River in western region of Argentina

Coordinates: 34°28′S 64°45′W

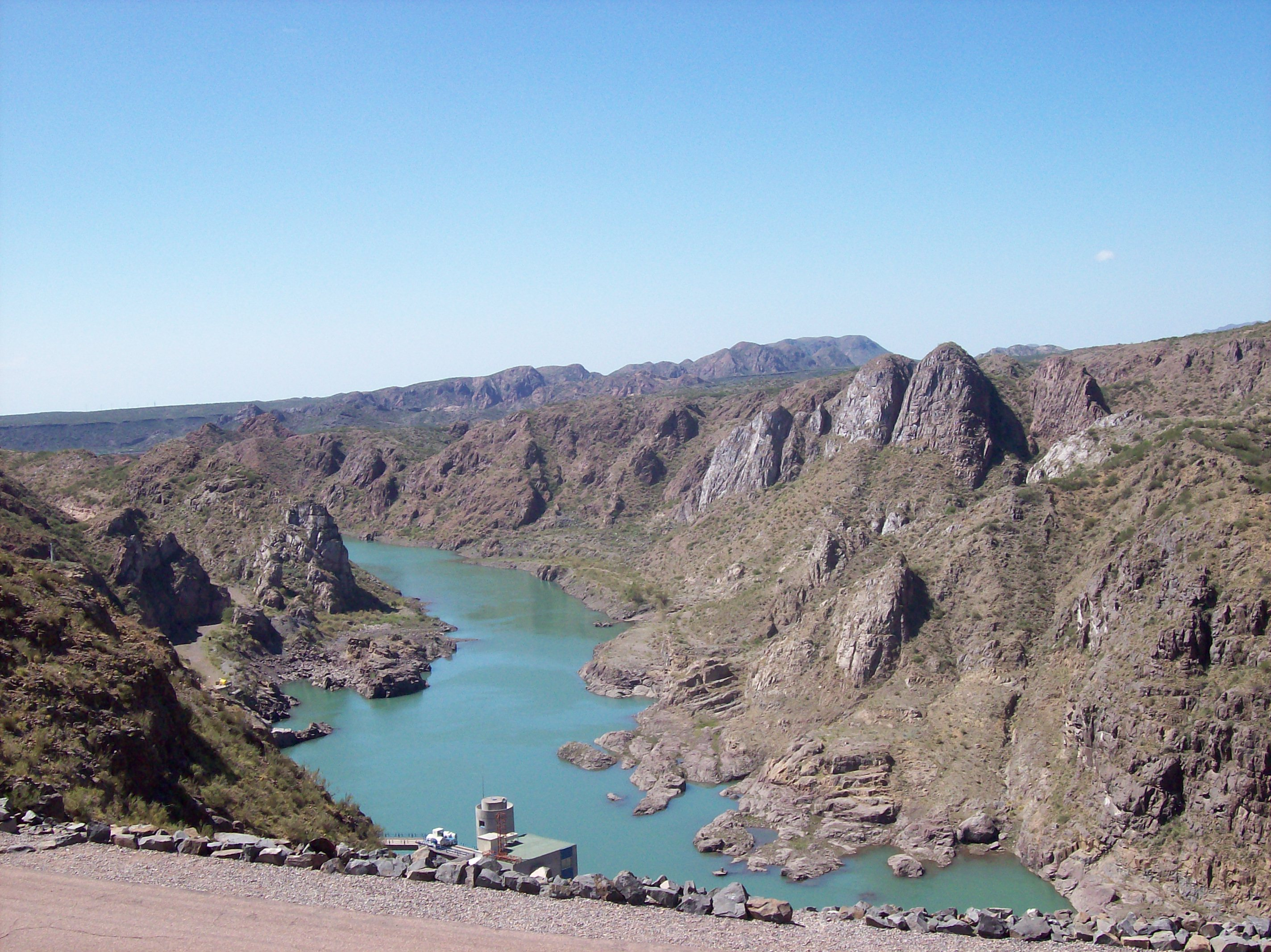
Diamante River valley, near San Rafael, Mendoza

The Diamante River is a river in the Argentine province of Mendoza. It is born from glaciers on the Maipo, a volcano in the Andes range in the Argentine–Chilean border, and flows east until emptying in the Desaguadero River. Its drainage basin covers an area of 2,750 square kilometres (1,060 sq mi) in the central region of Mendoza.

== Course ==
The Diamante is fed by ice-thaw-fed streams that flow into its source, the Diamante Lake. It has an average flow of 33 cubic metres per second (1,200 cu ft/s), with its maximum during the spring and summer; the October–March period accounts for 70 percent of the annual water volume.

The upper course of the river turns south and then back north, and becomes entrenched within the deep, narrow Agua del Toro Canyon, where it is dammed to produce hydroelectricity by the Agua del Toro Dam, at about 69° W, and a few kilometres later by the Los Reyunos Dam. Together these two power stations generate 500 MW.

Upon reaching the plain, the Diamante loses part of its volume through infiltration and evaporation. It turns in a gentle arc, passing south of the city of San Rafael, in the geographical center of Mendoza, where it is used for irrigation (together with the Atuel River).

The river splits in multiple branches shortly before reaching the Desaguadero (here called Salado), on the border with the province of San Luis.
