= Dipped ware =

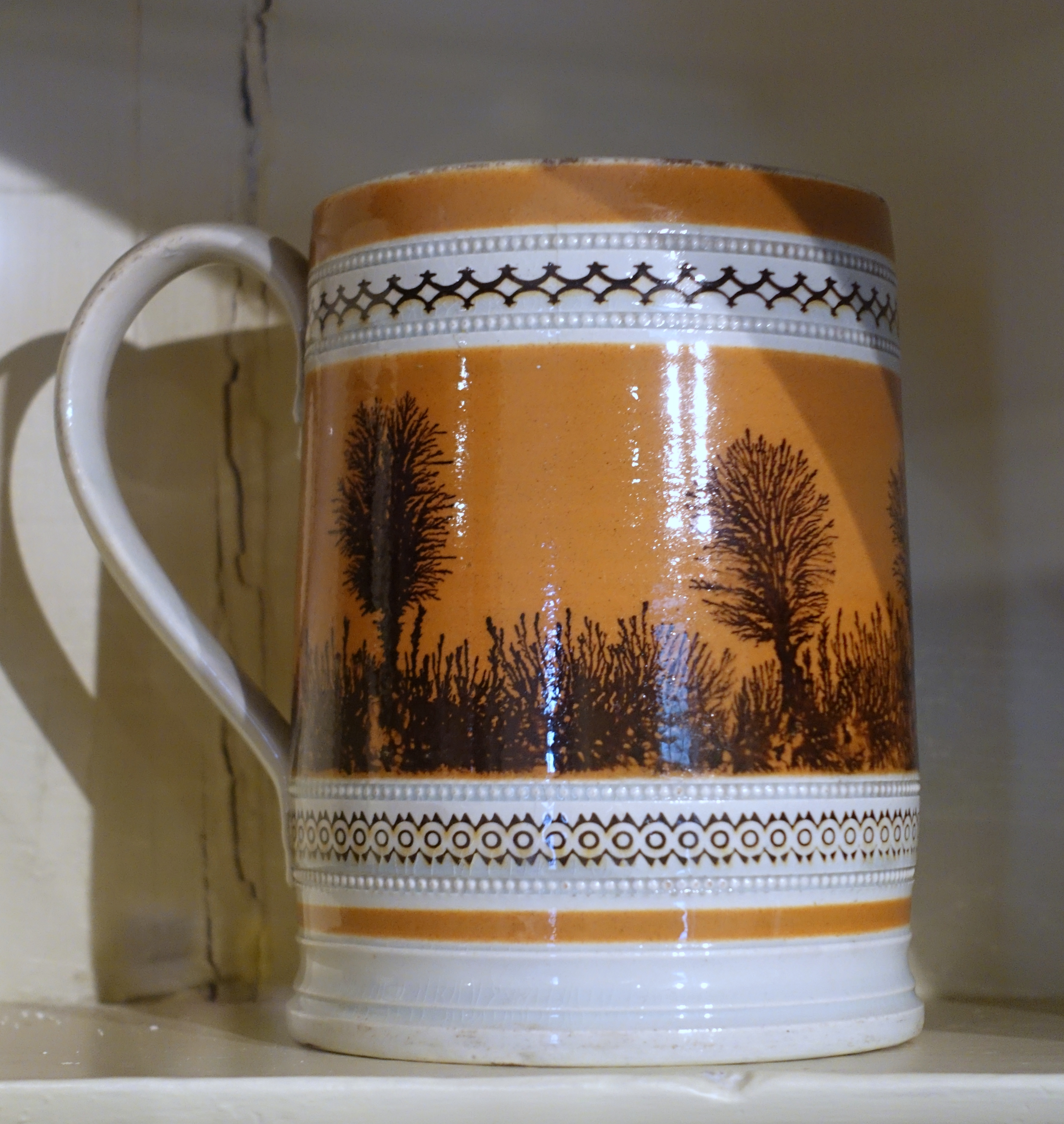
Mug with mocha decoration, England, c. 1800, earthenware

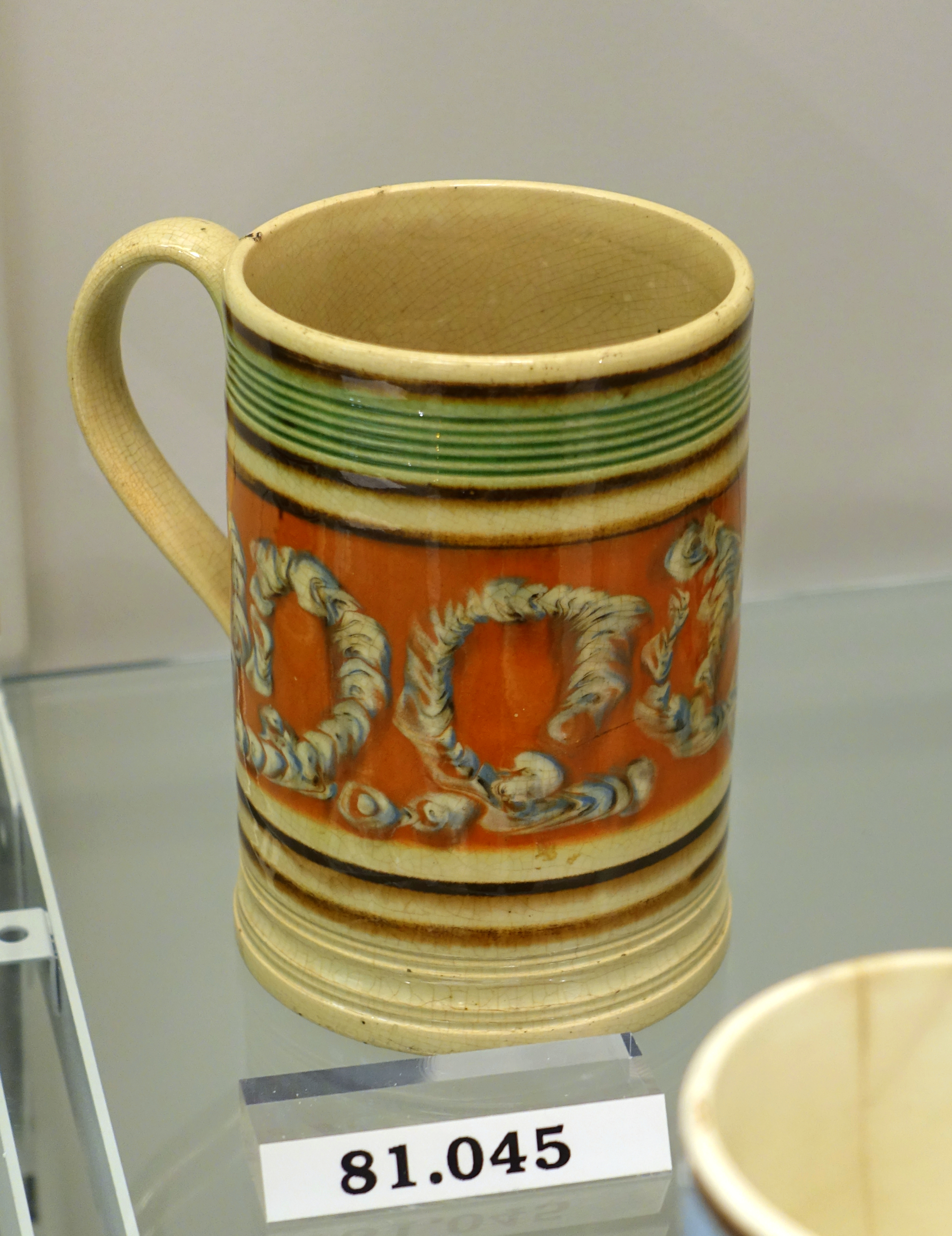
Mug with "earthworm" pattern, England, 1820-1840

Dipped ware is the period term used by potters in late 18th- and 19th-century British potteries for utilitarian earthenware vessels turned on horizontal lathes and decorated with coloured slip; they are thus a type of slipware. The earliest examples have either variegated surfaces or geometric patterns created with the use of a rose and crown engine-turning lathe. By the 1790s mocha decoration began to be used, consisting of dendritic (branching) patterns formed by the reaction of the introduction of an acidic coloring agent to the alkalinity of the wet slip surface. Further decorative motifs were developed in the early 19th century, including common cable, called "earthworm" by collectors, as well as "cat's eyes", "dipped fan", and "twig", all collector terms as no surviving period documents have revealed the terminology used by the manufacturers for such motifs. Much of the factory output was intended for export, with large quantities shipped to North America where bowls, mugs, jugs, and other useful forms were used in households and taverns.
