= Needle Peak (Inyo County, California) =

Mountain in Inyo County, eastern California

- Location within California Location within the United States

Highest point
- Elevation: 5,791 ft (1,765 m)
- Prominence: 1,651 ft (503 m)
- Coordinates: 35°53′9.94″N 117°1′42.61″W

Geography
- Location: Inyo County, California, United States
- Parent range: Panamint Range
- Topo map: USGS Manly Peak

Needle Peak is a mountain in the Panamint Range in the northern Mojave Desert, in Inyo County, eastern California.

The peak has an altitude of 1,769 metres (5,804 ft).

The peak and Panamint Range are protected within Death Valley National Park.

== See also ==
- Panamint Range topics
- List of mountain peaks of California
- List of U.S. National Parks by Elevation
