= Sagenite =

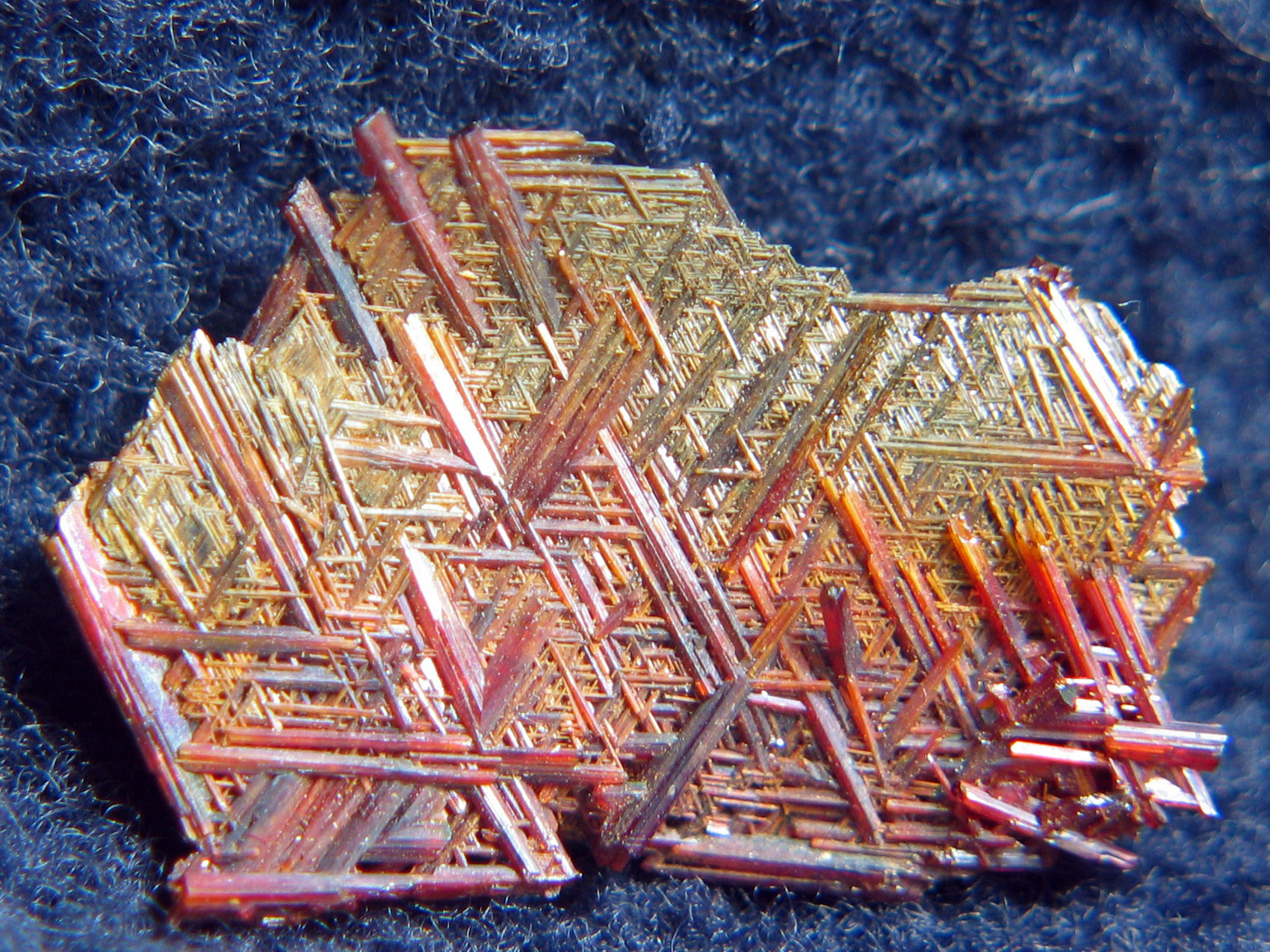
Twinned rutile with a reticulated lattice pattern (Pakistan), the first mineral variety to be called sagenite

Sagenite may refer to any of the following types of minerals with an acicular (needle-shaped) crystal habit. It is not a valid mineral species.

- A twinned, reticulated variety of rutile originally described in 1796 by Horace Bénédict de Saussure.
- Rutilated quartz, a variety of quartz with acicular inclusions of often golden-yellow rutile, first called sagenite by George Kunz in 1892.
- Sagenitic agate, a type of agate with acicular inclusions of another mineral such as anhydrite, aragonite, goethite, rutile, or a zeolite.
- Any other variety of quartz or chalcedony with acicular inclusions of another mineral.
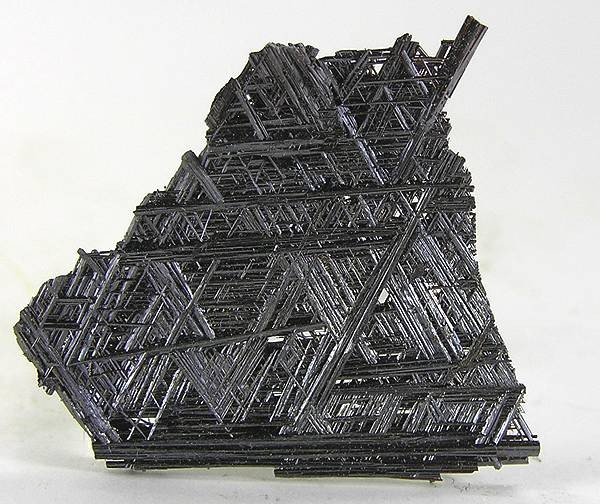
Rutile sagenite from Brazil

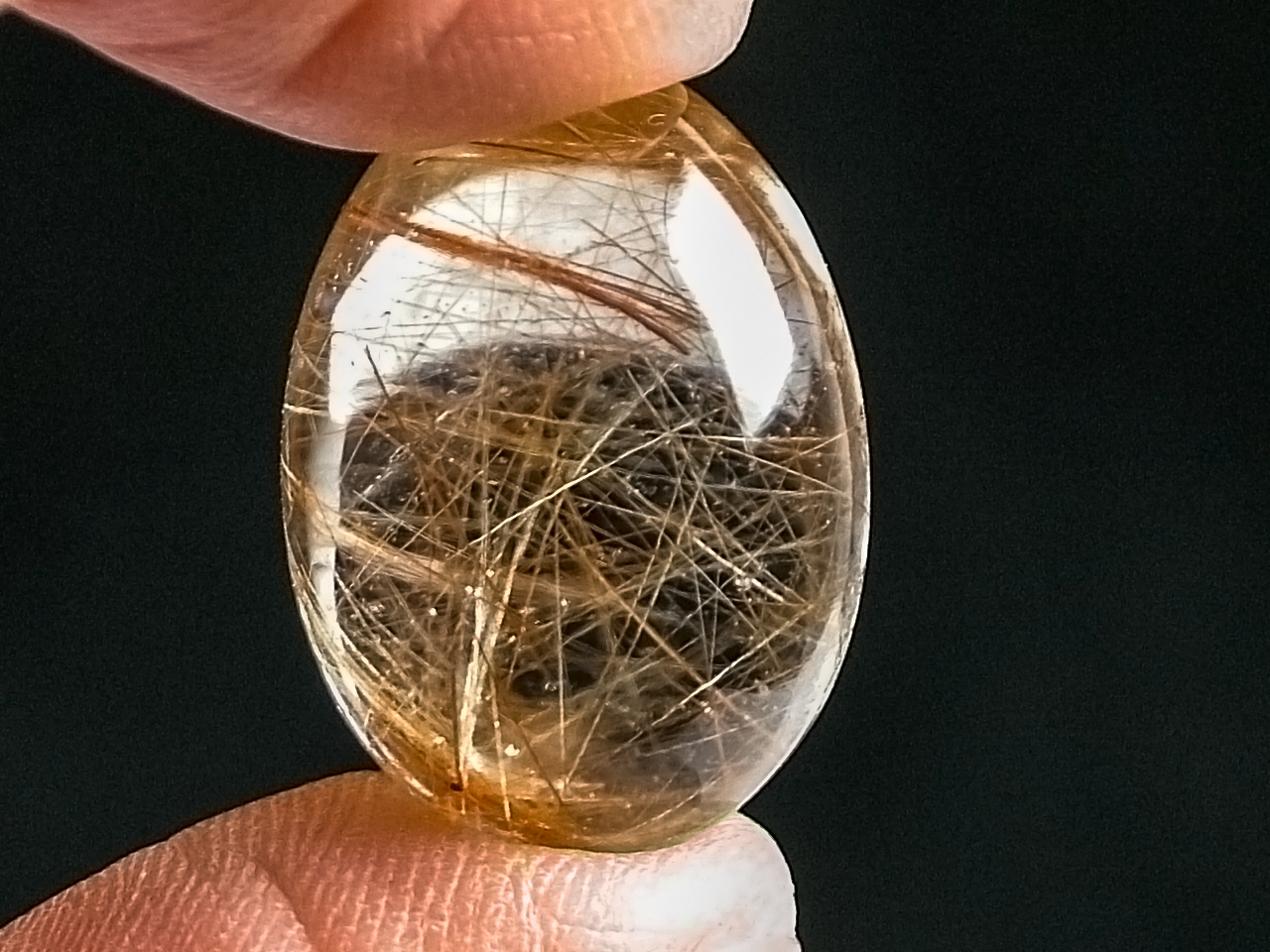
Rutilated quartz sagenite

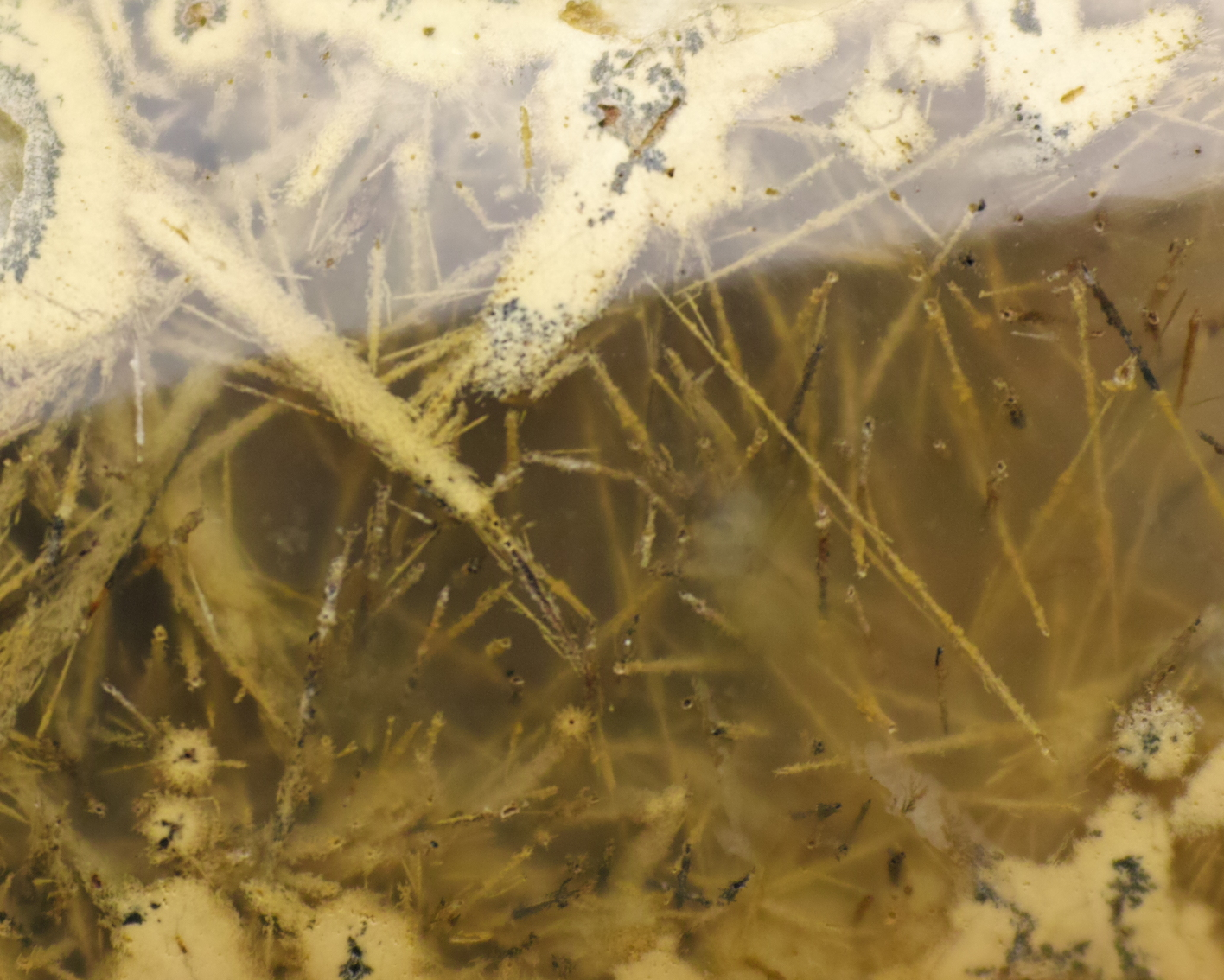
Sagenitic agate from the Oregon coast
