= San Rafael, Mendoza =

San Rafael
- City
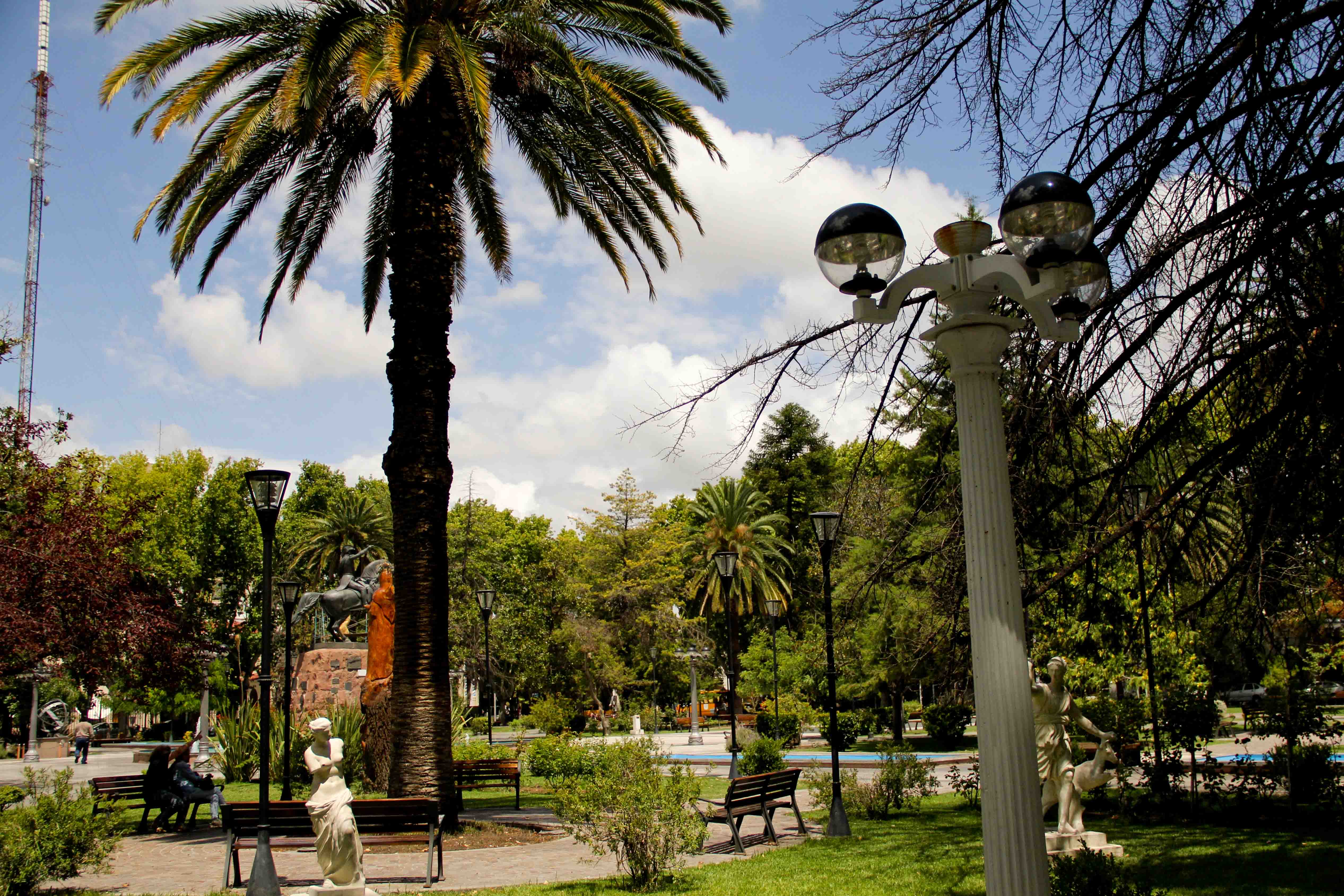
- Plaza San Martin

- Location of San Rafael in Argentina
- Coordinates: 34°36′S 68°20′W
- Country: Argentina
- Province: Mendoza
- Department: San Rafael
- Founded: 2 October 1903

Government
  - Intendant: Omar Felix
- Elevation: 750 m (2,460 ft)

Population (2010 census)
  - Total: 118,009
- Demonym: sanrafaelino
- Time zone: UTC−3 (ART)
- CPA base: M5600
- Dialing code: +54 0260
- Climate: BSk
- Website: Official website

San Rafael is a city in the southern region of the Mendoza Province, Argentina. With more than 118,000 inhabitants (2010 census [INDEC]), it is the largest city in and the seat of San Rafael Department.

The city is located 240 km from the provincial capital and 990 km from the federal capital. Natural attractions in the area include the Diamante River, which flows through the city, the rapids-strewn Atuel River just south and Lake Los Reyunos, 20 km (12 mi) west of San Rafael.

== History ==
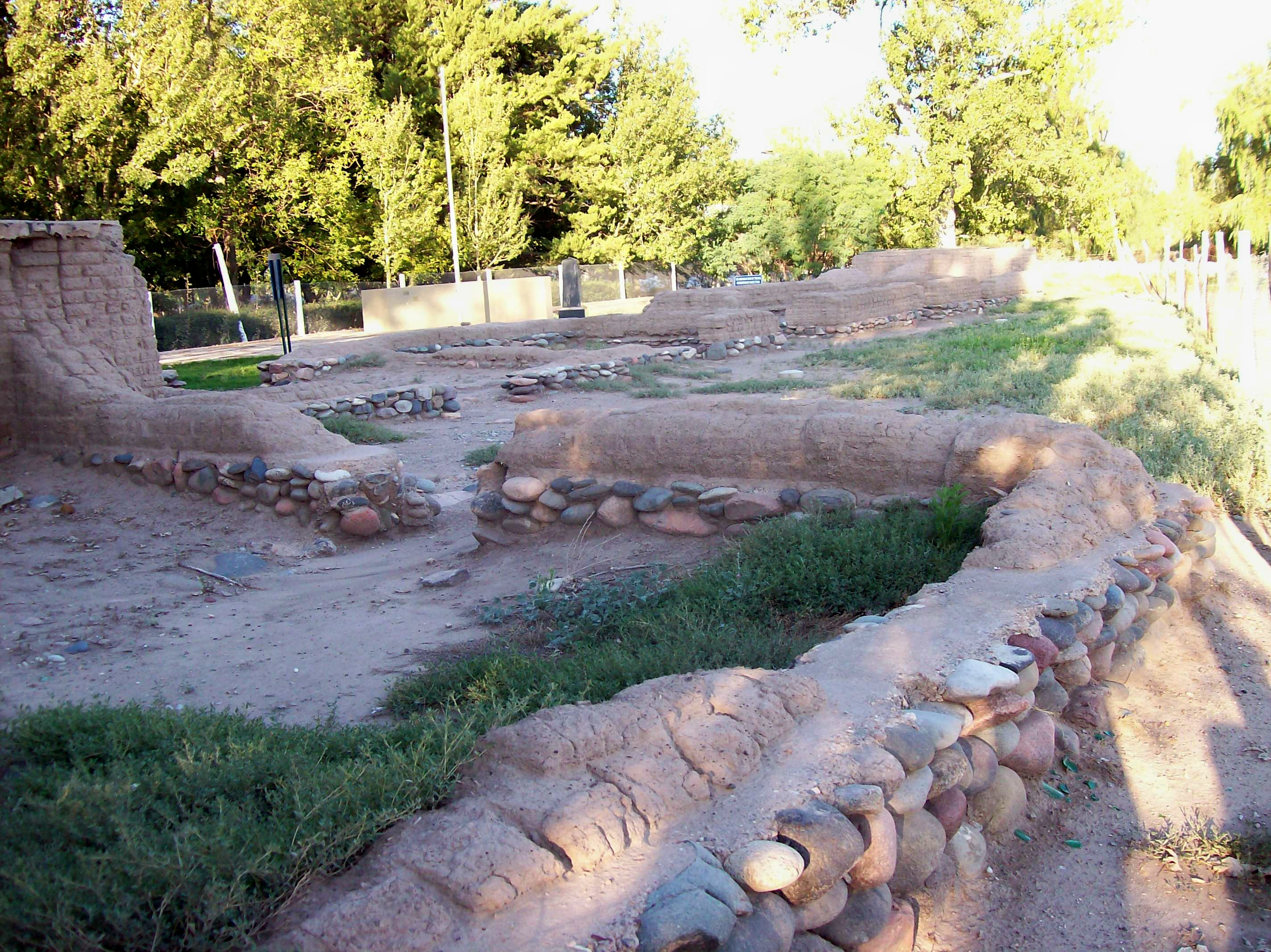
Remains of the Fort of San Rafael

Spanish expeditions led by Francisco de Villagra from what today is Chile first surveyed the area in 1551 and, finding a well-established agricultural Coquimbo and Diaguita cultures, they rapidly subdued the existing peoples and expropriated the land. Displaced Pehuenches revolted, however, and repeated attacks led to an 1804 treaty signed by Viceroy Rafael de Sobremonte whereby the Pehuenches ceded land to colonial authorities. The construction of Fort San Rafael del Diamante and its completion on 2 April 1805 marked the formal establishment of San Rafael.

San Rafael remained relatively isolated from the rest of the country, long after independence in 1816. The area's agricultural potential and strategic location were eventually brought to the federal government's attention. In 1871, civil engineer Julio Balloffet was commissioned to oversee the development of San Rafael. His efforts were centered around needed public works, among which were civic buildings, schools, plazas, a hospital, cathedral and irrigation works. The irrigation canals were accompanied by an agricultural laboratory and a panel of agronomists and, by 1900, the San Rafael area fruit orchards had attracted a sizable contingent of Italian and French immigrants.

This sudden prosperity led to San Rafael's formal designation as department seat in 1903 and, that November, the expanding railways reach the city. The railways led to the local development of food processing industries, as well as to the town's designation as a "city" in 1922. The torrential Atuel and Diamante Rivers facilitated the construction of a number of important hydroelectric dams in the area, bringing further prominence to San Rafael as an economic and tourist hub within southern Mendoza Province. The first, the Nihuiles Hydroelectric Dam, was inaugurated in 1953 on the Atuel River. The facility, which generates around 1000 MWh annually (today nearly 1% of the entire nation's), also resulted in the creation of a 9000 hectare (35 mi^{2}) reservoir, bringing with it growing recreational tourism into the area. A similarly important work, Los Reyunos Dam, was built on the Diamante River, south of San Rafael, and inaugurated in 1984. The city, since 1968, has also hosted auto racing competitions at its La Paredes Autodrome, including numerous ones for Argentina's prestigious TC 2000 touring car racing competitions.

== Geography ==
=== Distances to other parts of the country ===
- Federal Capital 990 km
- Córdoba (Capital) 705 km
- Neuquén (Capital) 605 km
- Mar del Plata (Buenos Aires) 1205 km
- Mendoza (Capital) 236 km
- Rosario (Santa Fe) 860 km
- San Luis (Capital) 273 km
- Tucumán (Capital) 1290 km
- Bariloche (Rio Negro) 1060 km

=== Climate ===
According to the Koppen climate classification, San Rafael experiences a cold semi-arid climate (BSk).

Climate data for San Rafael Airport, Mendoza (1991–2020, extremes 1961–present)
Month	Jan	Feb	Mar	Apr	May	Jun	Jul	Aug	Sep	Oct	Nov	Dec	Year
Record high °C (°F)	43.3 (109.9)	40.7 (105.3)	38.0 (100.4)	34.4 (93.9)	33.7 (92.7)	32.0 (89.6)	28.0 (82.4)	35.6 (96.1)	35.0 (95.0)	36.5 (97.7)	39.8 (103.6)	41.5 (106.7)	43.3 (109.9)
Mean daily maximum °C (°F)	31.8 (89.2)	30.2 (86.4)	27.4 (81.3)	22.6 (72.7)	18.5 (65.3)	16.1 (61.0)	15.4 (59.7)	18.0 (64.4)	20.5 (68.9)	23.9 (75.0)	27.6 (81.7)	30.7 (87.3)	23.6 (74.5)
Daily mean °C (°F)	23.8 (74.8)	22.0 (71.6)	19.4 (66.9)	14.6 (58.3)	10.7 (51.3)	7.7 (45.9)	6.8 (44.2)	9.1 (48.4)	12.2 (54.0)	16.0 (60.8)	19.7 (67.5)	22.6 (72.7)	15.4 (59.7)
Mean daily minimum °C (°F)	15.8 (60.4)	14.7 (58.5)	12.9 (55.2)	8.6 (47.5)	5.2 (41.4)	1.9 (35.4)	0.8 (33.4)	2.3 (36.1)	4.9 (40.8)	8.2 (46.8)	11.4 (52.5)	14.2 (57.6)	8.4 (47.1)
Record low °C (°F)	4.3 (39.7)	4.8 (40.6)	−2.7 (27.1)	−4.3 (24.3)	−7.8 (18.0)	−8.4 (16.9)	−9.7 (14.5)	−8.7 (16.3)	−6.9 (19.6)	−2.4 (27.7)	−0.3 (31.5)	1.5 (34.7)	−9.7 (14.5)
Average precipitation mm (inches)	54.2 (2.13)	50.6 (1.99)	40.2 (1.58)	26.6 (1.05)	21.3 (0.84)	7.2 (0.28)	11.1 (0.44)	14.5 (0.57)	21.5 (0.85)	38.3 (1.51)	36.2 (1.43)	41.2 (1.62)	362.9 (14.29)
Average precipitation days (≥ 0.1 mm)	6.9	6.4	5.1	4.2	4.3	2.2	2.5	3.1	4.0	5.1	5.8	6.0	55.4
Average snowy days	0.0	0.0	0.0	0.1	0.2	0.2	0.9	1.0	0.4	0.1	0.0	0.0	2.8
Average relative humidity (%)	50.0	56.1	61.3	65.7	68.6	63.2	60.4	53.8	52.6	51.3	48.2	46.6	56.5
Mean monthly sunshine hours	275.9	243.0	226.3	198.0	170.5	159.0	186.0	204.6	198.0	241.8	261.0	263.5	2,627.6
Mean daily sunshine hours	8.9	8.6	7.3	6.6	5.5	5.3	6.0	6.6	6.6	7.8	8.7	8.5	7.2
Percentage possible sunshine	73	73	64	64	59	51	52	61	55	62	68	71	63
Source 1: Servicio Meteorológico Nacional
Source 2: UNLP (percent sun 1971–1980)

== Gallery ==
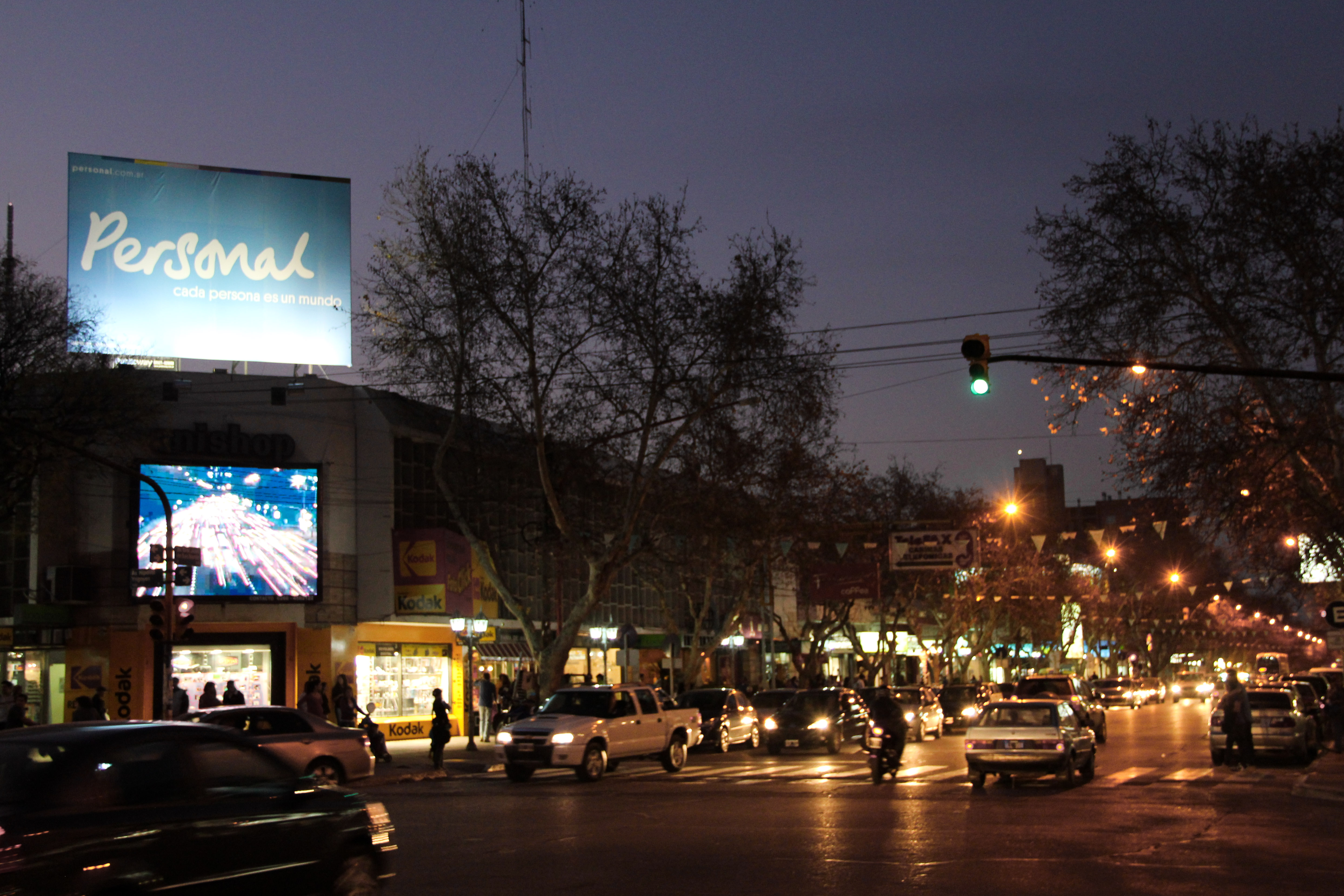
San Rafael's Downtown

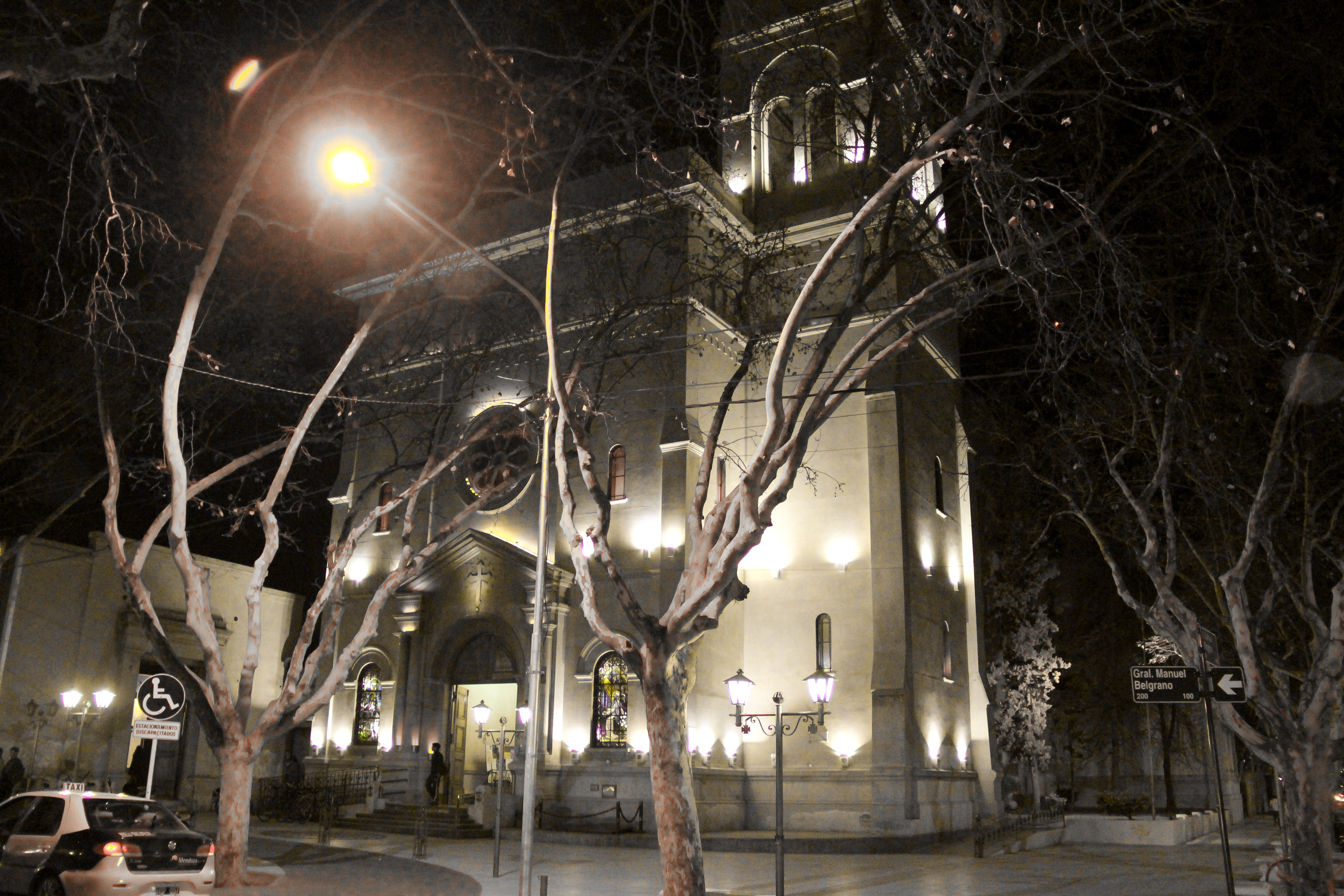
San Rafael's Cathedral

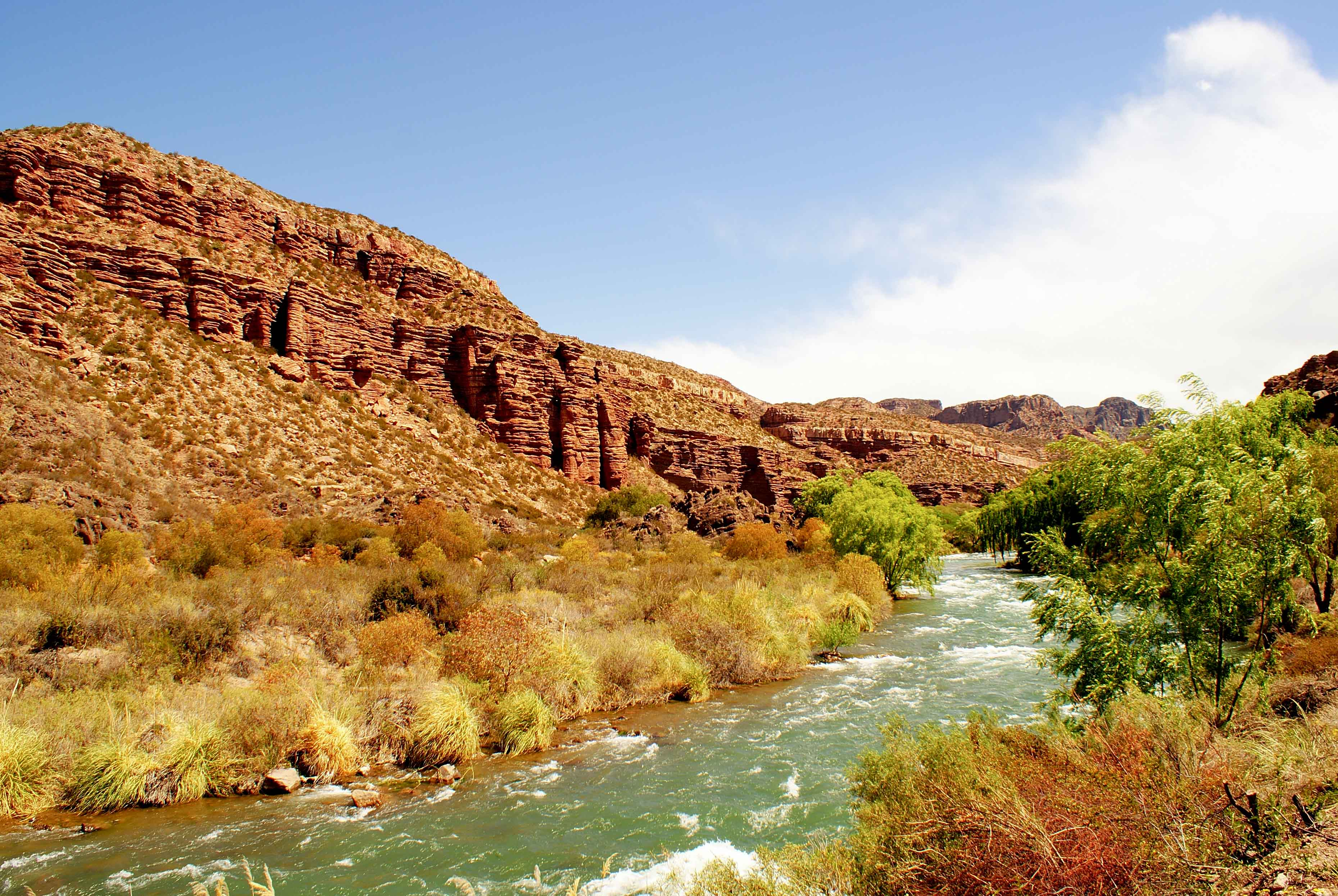
Atuel's River on Valle Grande

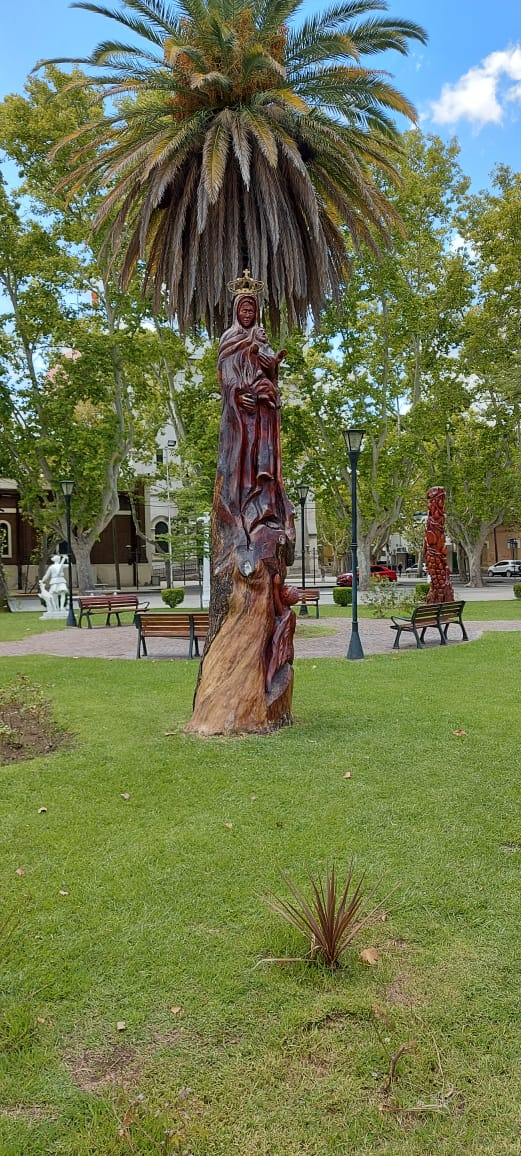
Statue in San Rafael

== See also ==
- Mendoza wine
- TC 2000
- Condor agate
