= Moss agate =

Agate variety

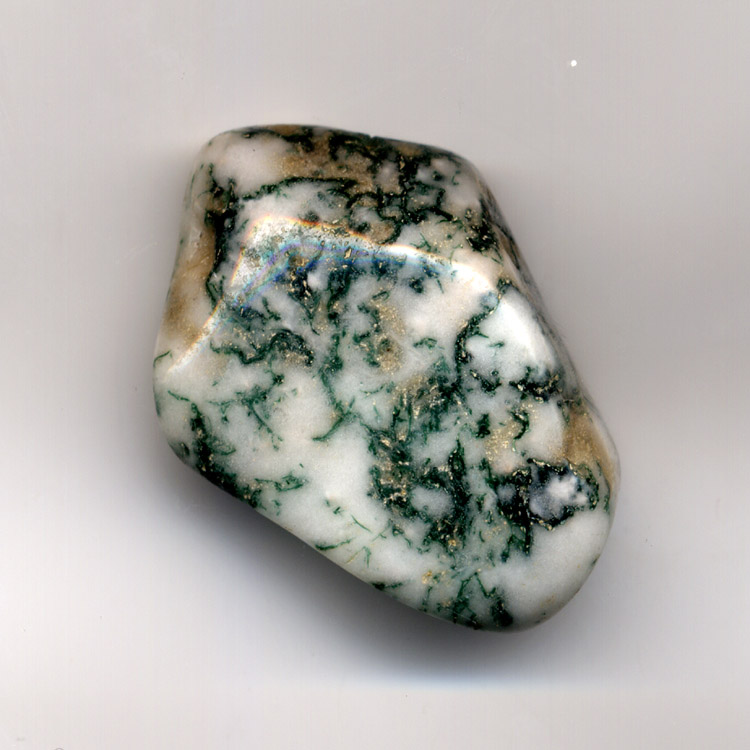
Moss agate pebble, 1 inch (25 mm) long

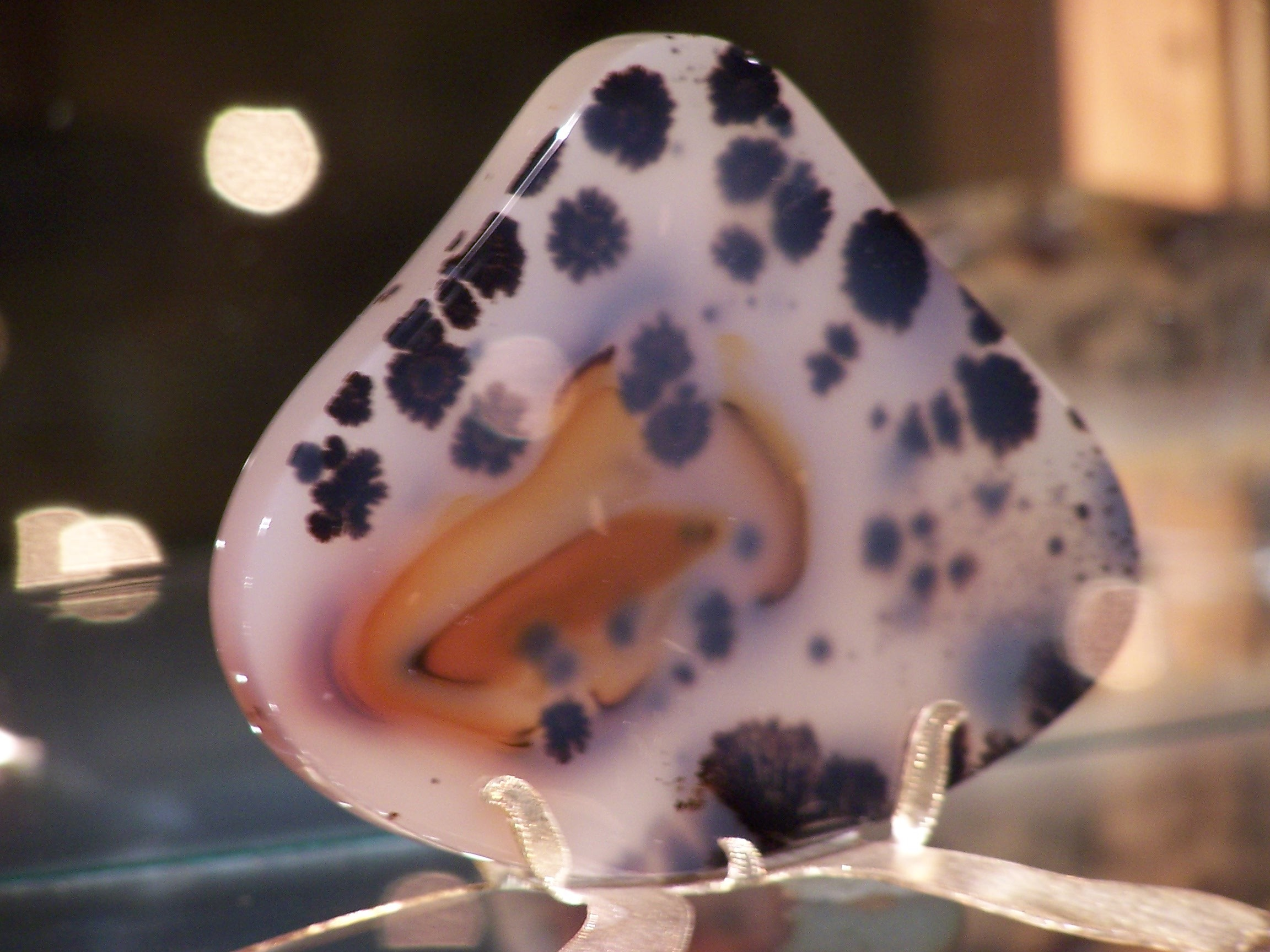
Montana moss agate

Moss agate is a semi-precious gemstone formed from silicon dioxide. It is a form of chalcedony which includes minerals of a green color embedded in the stone, forming filaments and other patterns suggestive of moss. The field is a clear or milky-white quartz, and the included minerals are mainly oxides of manganese or iron. It is not a true form of agate, because it does not have concentric banding.

Moss agate can be clear or milky white, with green dendritic inclusions that resemble moss. The colors are formed due to trace amounts of metal present as an impurity, such as chrome or iron. The metals can make different colors depending on their valence (oxidation state). Despite its name, moss agate does not contain organic matter and is usually formed from weathered volcanic rocks.

Moss agate is found in countries across the world, including India, Brazil, Uruguay, central European countries, and the United States. In the U.S., Montana moss agate is found in the alluvial gravels of the Yellowstone River and its tributaries between Sidney and Billings, Montana. It was originally formed in the Yellowstone National Park area of Wyoming as a result of volcanic activity. In Montana moss agate the red color is the result of iron oxide and the black color is the result of manganese oxide.

The gemstone has also been known as "Mocha stone" after the Arabian city of Mokha (Mocha) in Yemen, once a source.

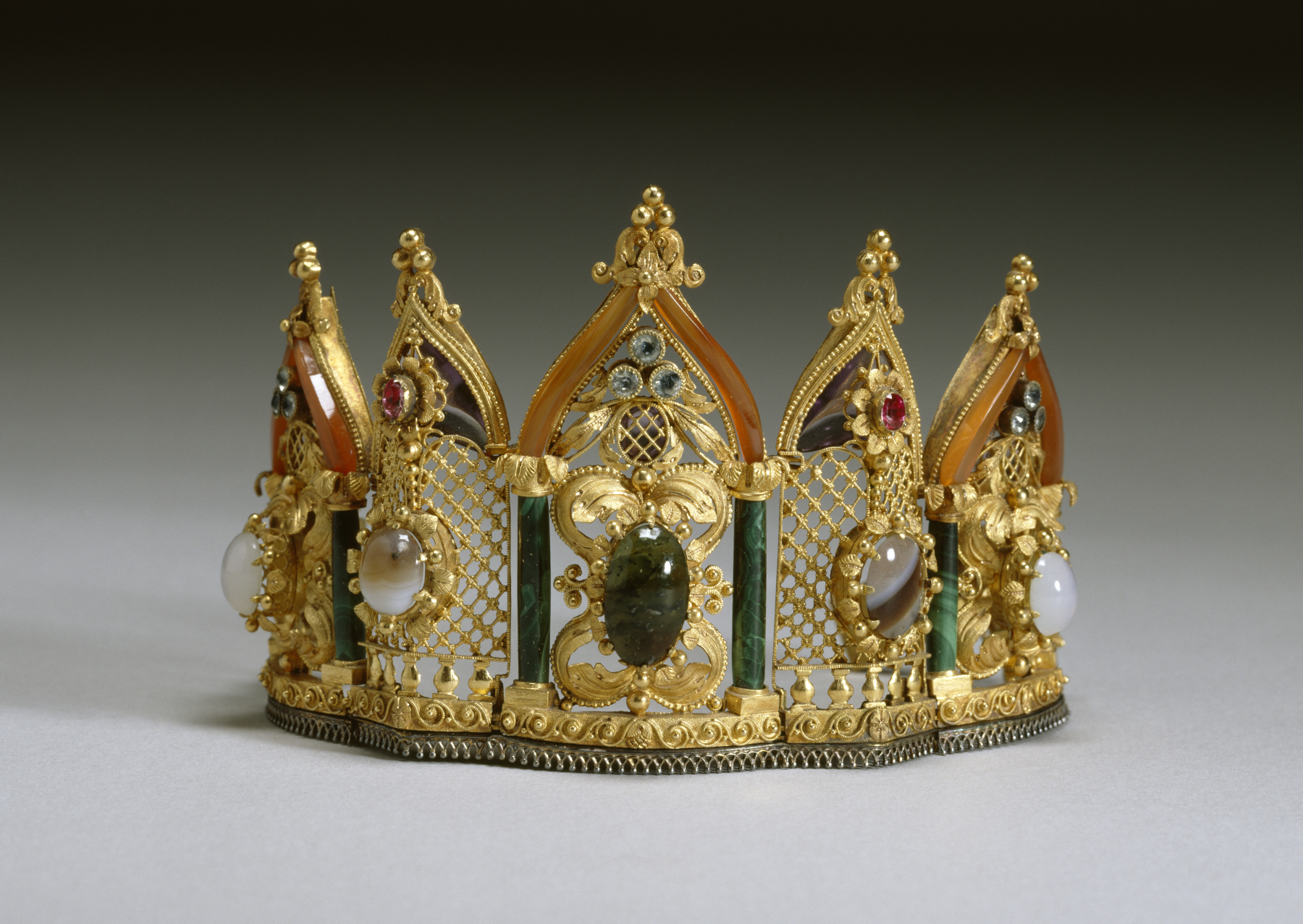
Gothic-Style Bracelet; gold, carnelian, malachite, moss agate, amethysts, aquamarines, rubies. The Walters Art Museum.
