= Amola-Faca River =

Amola-Faca River or Rio Amola-Faca or Rio do Amola-Faca may refer to the following rivers in Santa Catarina, Brazil:

- Amola-Faca River (Caveiras River tributary)
- Amola-Faca River (Itoupava River tributary)
