= Cachoeira River (Timbó River tributary) =

Location
- Country: Brazil

Physical characteristics
- Source
  - location: Santa Catarina state
- Mouth
  - location: Timbó River
  - coordinates: 26.5867°S 50.7474°W

The Cachoeira River (Portuguese: Rio Cachoeira) is a river of Santa Catarina state in southeastern Brazil. It is part of the Paraná River basin and a tributary of the Timbó River.

== See also ==
- List of rivers of Santa Catarina
