= Preto River (Do Peixe River tributary) =

Location
- Country: Brazil

Physical characteristics
- Source
  - location: Santa Catarina state
- Mouth: Do Peixe River
  - coordinates: 26°56′S 51°6′W

The Preto River is a river of Santa Catarina state in southeastern Brazil. It is part of the Uruguay River basin and is a tributary of the Do Peixe River.

== See also ==
- List of rivers of Santa Catarina
