= Feliciano River (Brazil) =

Location
- Country: Brazil

Physical characteristics
- Source
  - location: Santa Catarina state
- Mouth: Saudades River
  - coordinates: 26°35′S 52°41′W

The Feliciano River is a river of Santa Catarina state in southeastern Brazil. It is a tributary of the Saudades River, part of the Uruguay River basin.

== See also ==
- List of rivers of Santa Catarina
