= Negrinho River (Mafra, Santa Catarina) =

Location
- Country: Brazil

Physical characteristics
- Source
  - location: Santa Catarina state
- Mouth: Rio Negro
  - coordinates: 26°11′S 49°41′W

The Negrinho River is a river of Santa Catarina state in southeastern Brazil. It is part of the Paraná River basin.

== See also ==
- List of rivers of Santa Catarina
