= Do Meio River (Itajaí River tributary) =

Location
- Country: Brazil

Physical characteristics
- Source
  - location: Santa Catarina state
- Mouth: Itajaí do Sul River
  - coordinates: 27°53′S 48°56′W

The Do Meio River is a river of Santa Catarina state in southeastern Brazil. It is a tributary of the Itajaí do Sul River.

== See also ==
- List of rivers of Santa Catarina
