= Das Pombas River =

Location
- Country: Brazil

Physical characteristics
- Source
  - location: Santa Catarina state
- Mouth: Itajaí do Oeste River
  - coordinates: 27°11′S 49°48′W

The Das Pombas River is a river of Santa Catarina state in southeastern Brazil. It is a tributary of the Itajaí do Oeste River.

== See also ==
- List of rivers of Santa Catarina
