= Do Meio River (Braço do Norte River tributary) =

Location
- Country: Brazil

Physical characteristics
- Source
  - location: Santa Catarina state
- Mouth: Braço do Norte River
  - coordinates: 28°2′S 49°8′W

The Do Meio River is a river of Santa Catarina state in southeastern Brazil. It is a tributary of the Braço do Norte River.

== See also ==
- List of rivers of Santa Catarina
