= Pirabeiraba River =

Location
- Country: Brazil

Physical characteristics
- Source
  - location: Santa Catarina state
- Mouth: Palmital River
  - coordinates: 26°7′S 48°48′W

The Pirabeiraba River is a river of Santa Catarina state in southeastern Brazil.

== See also ==
- List of rivers of Santa Catarina
