= Do Leão River =

Location
- Country: Brazil

Physical characteristics
- Source
  - location: Santa Catarina state
- Mouth: Do Peixe River
  - coordinates: 27°17′S 51°32′W

The Do Leão River is a river of Santa Catarina state in southeastern Brazil. It is part of the Uruguay River basin.

== See also ==
- List of rivers of Santa Catarina
