= Macaco River =

River in Brazil

Location
- Country: Brazil

Physical characteristics
- Source
  - location: Santa Catarina state
- Mouth: Três Voltas River
  - coordinates: 26°31′S 52°57′W

The Macaco River is a river of Santa Catarina state in southeastern Brazil. It is a tributary of the Três Voltas River, part of the Uruguay River basin.

== See also ==
- List of rivers of Santa Catarina
