= Osasco Sporting =

- Full name: Osasco Sporting
- Nickname: Clube da cidade de Oz (Oz City Club)
- Founded: 25 January 1921; 105 years ago
- Ground: Pref. José Liberatti
- Capacity: 12,000
- Owner: Aparecido Roberto de Freitas
- President: Ernesto Francisco Garcia
- Head coach: Moacir Júnior
- League: Campeonato Paulista Série A2
- 2025: Paulista Série A2, 10th of 16
- Website: osascosporting.com.br
Home colors	Away colors	Third colors

Osasco Sporting, formerly known as Oeste Futebol Clube, is a Brazilian association football club based in Osasco. They currently play in the Campeonato Paulista Série A2, the second division of the São Paulo state football league.

Originally from Itápolis in São Paulo state, was founded on 25 January 1921. After was played in Barueri. They play in blue and white shirts, white shorts and blue socks.

== History ==
Oeste FC badge, used until 2025

The club was founded in 1921 by two brothers from Rio de Janeiro. One was a supporter of Clube de Regatas do Flamengo, while the other was a supporter of Fluminense. A training match against an amateur club from the municipality of Fazenda Itaquerê was set to decide if the club would be named Flamengo or Fluminense. With a victory, the club would be named Flamengo, while if defeated the club would be named Fluminense. The club beat their opponents 3–0, but adopted the name Oeste Futebol Clube, after the Center-West region of São Paulo state, while Flamengo's colors were chosen.

The club competed in the Campeonato Paulista Série A1 for the first time in 2004, after winning the Série A2 in the previous season. The club returned to the Série A1 in 2009, after being defeated by Santo André in the Série A2 final in 2008. Oeste won the 2012 Série C after beating Icasa in the final. In 2016, they sealed a partnership with Grêmio Osasco Audax, 2016 Campeonato Paulista A1 runners-up, for the 2016 Serie B, which included mixing players from both teams in one squad and playing home games at Audax's stadium in Osasco.

In 2017, Oeste was relocated definitely to the city of Barueri, since the Estádio Municipal dos Amaros wasn't allowed to host Série B matches due to its limitations, and the City Hall of Itápolis, owners of the stadium, couldn't reach an agreement with the club.

On 26 December 2025, the club then called Oeste announced a change of name (to Osasco Sporting), logo, and city, moving from Barueri to Osasco. The club is also adopting a new identity with the aim of strengthening ties with the community and increasing the pride of local fans, reviving the city's football atmosphere.

== Symbols ==
The club's mascot is a jaguar, named after one of the city's main rivers, Da Onça River (Rio da Onça), onça is Portuguese for jaguar.

== Stadium ==
For most of their history, Oeste's home stadium has been the Estádio Municipal dos Amaros, which has a maximum capacity of 6,000 people. Now and them they played their home games at Prefeito José Liberatti, located in Osasco.

== Honours ==
=== Official tournaments ===
National
Competitions	Titles	Seasons
Campeonato Brasileiro Série C	1	2012
State
Competitions	Titles	Seasons
Copa Paulista	1	1981
Campeonato Paulista Série A2	1	2003
Campeonato Paulista Série A3	2	1992, 2002
Campeonato Paulista Série A4	1	1998
Campeonato Paulista Segunda Divisão	1^{s}	1997

- record
- ^{s} shared record

=== Others tournaments ===
==== State ====
- Campeonato Paulista do Interior (1): 2011

=== Runners-up ===
- Campeonato Paulista Série A2 (2): 2008, 2018
- Campeonato Paulista Série A3 (1): 1999
