= Itapocuzinho River =

Location
- Country: Brazil

Physical characteristics
- Source
  - location: Santa Catarina state
- Mouth: Itapoçu River
  - coordinates: 26°28′S 49°1′W

The Itapocuzinho River is a river of Santa Catarina state in southeastern Brazil.

== See also ==
- List of rivers of Santa Catarina
