= Três Barras River =

There are several rivers named Três Barras River in Brazil:

- Três Barras River (Paraná)
- Três Barras River (Santa Catarina)
