= Do Engano River =

Location
- Country: Brazil

Physical characteristics
- Source
  - location: Santa Catarina state
- Mouth: Tijucas River
  - coordinates: 27°29′S 48°59′W

The Do Engano River is a river of Santa Catarina state in southeastern Brazil.

== See also ==
- List of rivers of Santa Catarina
