= Leão River =

Location
- Country: Brazil

Physical characteristics
- Source
  - location: Santa Catarina state
- Mouth: Canoas River
  - coordinates: 29°9′S 49°49′W

The Leão River is a river of Santa Catarina state in southeastern Brazil. It is a tributary of Canoas or Sertão branch river.

== See also ==
- List of rivers of Santa Catarina
