= Santa Cruz River =

Santa Cruz River or Rio Santa Cruz may refer to:

== Rivers ==
- Santa Cruz River (Argentina)
- Santa Cruz River (Santa Catarina), Brazil
- Santa Cruz River (Philippines)
- Santa Cruz River (Arizona), Mexico and United States
- Santa Cruz River (New Mexico), a tributary of the Rio Grande, in the United States
- Santa Cruz River (Venezuela), see Aroa mines

== Other uses ==
- SS Rio Santa Cruz, an Argentinian steamship

== See also ==
- Santa Cruz (disambiguation)
