= Púlpito River =

Location
- Country: Brazil

Physical characteristics
- Source
  - location: Santa Catarina state
- Mouth: Das Contas River
  - coordinates: 28°31′S 49°43′W

The Púlpito River is a river of Santa Catarina state in southeastern Brazil. It is part of the Uruguay River basin and a tributary of the Das Contas River.

== See also ==
- List of rivers of Santa Catarina
