= São Mateus River (Santa Catarina) =

Location
- Country: Brazil

Physical characteristics
- Source
  - location: Santa Catarina state
- Mouth: Lava-Tudo River
  - coordinates: 28°20′S 50°13′W

The São Mateus River is a river of Santa Catarina state in southeastern Brazil. It is part of the Uruguay River basin and a tributary of the Lava-Tudo River.

== See also ==
- List of rivers of Santa Catarina
