= Saudades River (lower Chapecó River tributary) =

Location
- Country: Brazil

Physical characteristics
- Source
  - location: Santa Catarina state
- Mouth: Chapecó River
  - coordinates: 26°58′S 52°58′W

The Saudades River is a river of Santa Catarina state in southeastern Brazil. It is part of the Uruguay River basin. It is a tributary of the Chapecó River.

== See also ==
- List of rivers of Santa Catarina
