= São Bento River (Mãe Luzia River tributary) =

Location
- Country: Brazil

Physical characteristics
- Source
  - location: Santa Catarina state
- Mouth: Mãe Luzia River
  - coordinates: 28°44′S 49°30′W

The São Bento River is a river of Santa Catarina state in southeastern Brazil. It is a tributary of the Mãe Luzia River.

== See also ==
- List of rivers of Santa Catarina
