= São João River (Canoas River tributary) =

Location
- Country: Brazil

Physical characteristics
- Source
  - location: Santa Catarina state
- Mouth: Inferno Grande River
  - coordinates: 27°30′13″S 51°11′21″W

The São João River is a tributary of the Canoas River in Santa Catarina state, southeastern Brazil. It is a tributary of the Inferno Grande River, part of the Uruguay River basin.

== See also ==
- List of rivers of Santa Catarina
