= Caçador Grande River =

Location
- Country: Brazil

Physical characteristics
- Source
  - location: Santa Catarina state
- Mouth: Timbó River
  - coordinates: 26°37′S 50°43′W

The Caçador Grande River is a river of Santa Catarina state in southeastern Brazil. It is part of the Paraná River basin and a tributary of the Timbó River.

== See also ==
- List of rivers of Santa Catarina
