= Trombudo River =

Location
- Country: Brazil

Physical characteristics
- Source
  - location: Santa Catarina state
- Mouth: Itajaí do Oeste River
  - coordinates: 27°15′S 49°42′W

The Trombudo River is a river of Santa Catarina state in south-eastern Brazil.

== River flow ==
It rises in the municipality of Agrolândia, runs through it in a south-north direction to the center of the municipality of Trombudo Central and then runs in a southwest-northeast direction through Agronômica and flows into the Itajaí do Oeste River on the border between the municipalities of Agronômica, Laurentino and Rio do Sul .

== See also ==
- List of rivers of Santa Catarina
