= Mansinho River =

Location
- Country: Brazil

Physical characteristics
- Source
  - location: Santa Catarina state
- Mouth: Correntes River
  - coordinates: 27°4′S 50°43′W

The Mansinho River is a river of Santa Catarina state in southeastern Brazil. It is part of the Uruguay River basin.

== See also ==
- List of rivers of Santa Catarina
