= Jundiá River (Santa Catarina) =

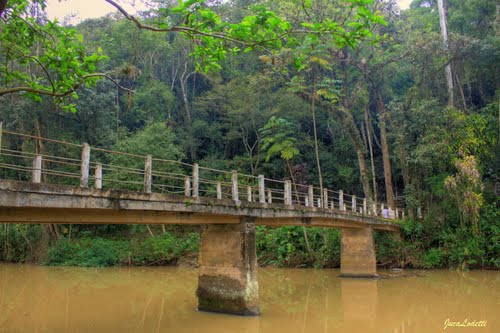

Location
- Country: Brazil

Physical characteristics
- Source
  - location: Santa Catarina state
- Mouth: Itoupava River
  - coordinates: 28°55′S 49°32′W

The Jundiá River is a river of Santa Catarina state in southeastern Brazil.

== See also ==
- List of rivers of Santa Catarina
