= Antoninha River =

Location
- Country: Brazil

Physical characteristics
- Source
  - location: Santa Catarina state
- Mouth: Lava-Tudo River
  - coordinates: 28°18′S 50°10′W

The Antoninha River is a river of Santa Catarina state in southeastern Brazil. It is part of the Uruguay River basin and a tributary of the Lava-Tudo River.

== See also ==
- List of rivers of Santa Catarina
