= Do Indio River (Santa Catarina) =

River in Santa Catarina, Brazil

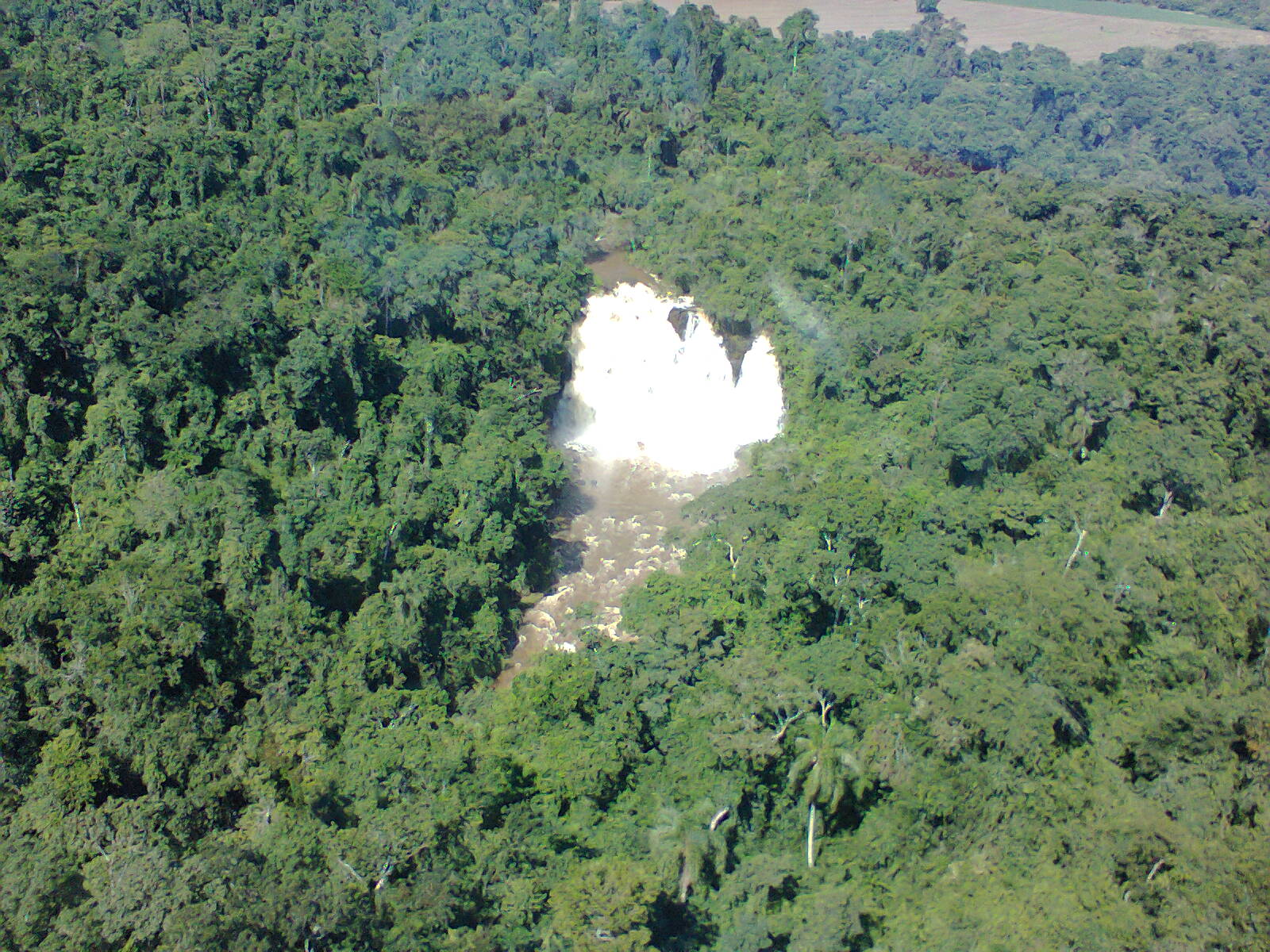

Location
- Country: Brazil

Physical characteristics
- Source
  - location: Santa Catarina state
- Mouth: Das Flores River
  - coordinates: 26°44′S 53°39′W

The Do Indio River is a river of Santa Catarina state in southeastern Brazil. It is part of the Uruguay River basin.

== See also ==
- List of rivers of Santa Catarina
