= Vermelho River (Santa Catarina) =

Location
- Country: Brazil

Physical characteristics
- Source
  - location: Santa Catarina state
- Mouth: Chapecó River
  - coordinates: 26°38′S 52°13′W

The Vermelho River is a river of Santa Catarina state in southeastern Brazil. It is part of the Uruguay River basin.

== See also ==
- List of rivers of Santa Catarina
