= Engano River (Itajaí River tributary) =

Location
- Country: Brazil

Physical characteristics
- Source
  - location: Santa Catarina state
- Mouth: Itajaí-Açu River
  - coordinates: 26°53′S 49°11′W

The Engano River is a river of Santa Catarina state in southeastern Brazil. It is a tributary of the Itajaí-Açu River.

== See also ==
- List of rivers of Santa Catarina
