= Rio Pequeno (Santa Catarina) =

Location
- Country: Brazil

Physical characteristics
- Source
  - location: Santa Catarina state
- Mouth: Braço do Norte River
  - coordinates: 27°1′S 48°38′W

Rio Pequeno (Portuguese for "little river") is a river of Santa Catarina state in southeastern Brazil.

== See also ==
- List of rivers of Santa Catarina
