= Lajeado Sertão River =

Lajeado Sertão

Location
- Country: Brazil

Physical characteristics
- Source
  - location: Santa Catarina state
- Mouth: São Domingos River
  - coordinates: 27°3′S 53°14′W

The Lajeado Sertão is a river of Santa Catarina state in southeastern Brazil.

== See also ==
- List of rivers of Santa Catarina
