= Jacutinga River (Das Antas River tributary) =

Location
- Country: Brazil

Physical characteristics
- Source
  - location: Santa Catarina state
- Mouth: Das Antas River
  - coordinates: 26°21′S 53°23′W

The Jacutinga River is a river of Santa Catarina state in southeastern Brazil. It is a tributary of the Das Antas River, which is part of the Uruguay River basin.

== See also ==
- List of rivers of Santa Catarina
