= Dos Cedros River =

Location
- Country: Brazil

Physical characteristics
- Source
  - location: Santa Catarina state
- Mouth: Benedito River
  - location: Timbó
  - coordinates: 26°50′S 49°16′W

The Dos Cedros River is a river of Santa Catarina state in southeastern Brazil. It is a tributary of the Benedito River in the city of Timbó.

== See also ==
- List of rivers of Santa Catarina
