= Taió River =

Location
- Country: Brazil

Physical characteristics
- Source
  - location: Santa Catarina state
- Mouth: Itajaí do Oeste River
  - coordinates: 27°7′S 50°0′W

The Taió River is a river of Santa Catarina state in south of Brazil.

== See also ==
- List of rivers of Santa Catarina
