= Pinheirinho River =

Location
- Country: Brazil

Physical characteristics
- Source
  - location: Santa Catarina state
- Mouth: Da Pedra River
  - coordinates: 28°58′S 49°43′W

The Pinheirinho River is a river of Santa Catarina state in southeastern Brazil. It is a tributary of the Da Pedra River.

== See also ==
- List of rivers of Santa Catarina
