= Bonito River (Correntes River tributary) =

Location
- Country: Brazil

Physical characteristics
- Source
  - location: Santa Catarina state
- Mouth: Correntes River
  - coordinates: 27°5′S 50°40′W

The Bonito River is a river of Santa Catarina state in southeastern Brazil. It is a tributary of the Correntes River, part of the Uruguay River basin. The lower reaches are sometimes referred to as the Timbó River.

== See also ==
- List of rivers of Santa Catarina
