= São João River (Negro River tributary) =

Location
- Country: Brazil

Physical characteristics
- Source
  - location: Santa Catarina state
- Mouth: Rio Negro
  - coordinates: 26°04′13″S 50°11′25″W

The São João River is a tributary of the Rio Negro in Santa Catarina state, southeastern Brazil. It is part of the Paraná River basin.

== See also ==
- List of rivers of Santa Catarina
