= Bituva River =

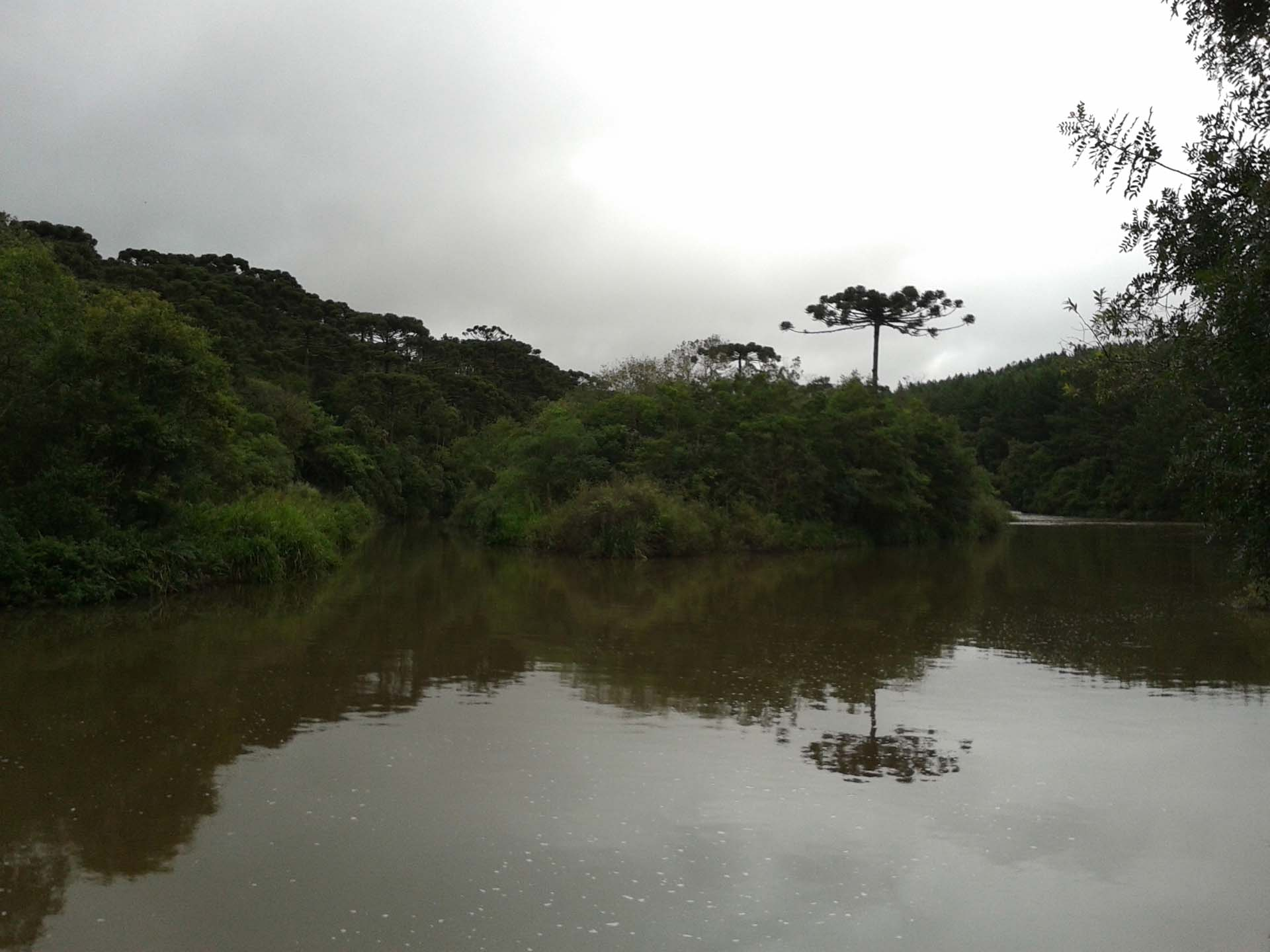

Location
- Country: Brazil

Physical characteristics
- Source
  - location: Santa Catarina state
- Mouth: Preto River
  - coordinates: 26°20′S 49°37′W

The Bituva River is a river of Santa Catarina state in southeastern Brazil. It is part of the Paraná River basin.

== See also ==
- List of rivers of Santa Catarina
