= Bonito River (Canoinhas River tributary) =

Location
- Country: Brazil

Physical characteristics
- Source
  - location: Santa Catarina state
- Mouth: Canoinhas River
  - coordinates: 26°18′S 50°18′W

The Bonito River is a river of Santa Catarina state in southeastern Brazil. It is part of the Paraná River basin and is a tributary of the Canoinhas River.

== See also ==
- List of rivers of Santa Catarina
