= Jangada River (Iguazu River tributary) =

River in Brazil

- Location of the mouth in Brazil

Location
- Country: Brazil

Physical characteristics
- Source
  - location: Santa Catarina state
- Mouth: Iguazu River
  - coordinates: 26°08′39″S 51°16′47″W

The Jangada River is a river of Santa Catarina and Paraná states in southeastern Brazil. It is part of the Paraná River basin and a tributary of the Iguazu River.

== See also ==
- List of rivers of Santa Catarina
