= Três Voltas River =

Location
- Country: Brazil

Physical characteristics
- Source
  - location: Santa Catarina state
- Mouth: Pesqueiro River
  - coordinates: 26°34′S 52°57′W

The Três Voltas River is a river of Santa Catarina state in southeastern Brazil. It is a tributary of the Pesqueiro River.

== See also ==
- List of rivers of Santa Catarina
