= Paciência River =

Location
- Country: Brazil

Physical characteristics
- Source
  - location: Santa Catarina state
- Mouth: Iguazu River
  - coordinates: 26°6′S 50°40′W

The Paciência River is a river of Santa Catarina state in southeastern Brazil. It is part of the Paraná River basin and a tributary of the Iguazu River.

== See also ==
- List of rivers of Santa Catarina
