= Rancho Grande River =

Coordinates: 27°22′22″S 51°59′12″W

Location
- Country: Brazil

Physical characteristics
- Source
  - location: Santa Catarina state

The Rancho Grande River is a river of Santa Catarina state in southeastern Brazil. It is part of the Uruguay River basin.

== See also ==
- List of rivers of Santa Catarina
