= Três Barras River (Santa Catarina) =

River in Santa Catarina, Brazil

Location
- Country: Brazil

Physical characteristics
- Source
  - location: Santa Catarina state
- Mouth: Palmital River
  - coordinates: 26°5′S 48°49′W

The Três Barras River is a river of Santa Catarina state in southeastern Brazil.

== See also ==
- List of rivers of Santa Catarina
