= Preto River (Negro River tributary) =

Location
- Country: Brazil

Physical characteristics
- Source
  - location: Santa Catarina state
- Mouth: Rio Negro
  - coordinates: 26°14′S 49°36′W

The Preto River is a river of Santa Catarina state in southeastern Brazil. It is part of the Paraná River basin and is a tributary of the Rio Negro.

== See also ==
- List of rivers of Santa Catarina
