= List of rivers of Santa Catarina =

List of rivers in Santa Catarina (Brazilian State).

The list is arranged by drainage basin from north to south, with respective tributaries indented under each larger stream's name and ordered from downstream to upstream. All rivers in Santa Catarina drain to the Atlantic Ocean.

== By Drainage Basin ==
=== Atlantic Coast ===
- Palmital River
  - Três Barras River
  - Pirabeiraba River
- Cubatão River
- Itapoçu River
  - Piraí River
  - Itapocuzinho River
  - Novo River
  - Humboldt River
- Itajaí-Açu River
  - Itajaí-Mirim River
  - Luís Alves River
    - Baú River
  - Garcia River
  - Engano River
  - Benedito River
    - Dos Cedros River
  - Itajaí do Norte River
    - Dos Indios River
      - Da Onça River
    - Da Prata River
    - Iraputã River
  - Itajaí do Oeste River
    - Trombudo River
    - Das Pombas River
    - Taió River
  - Itajaí do Sul River
    - Perimbó River
    - Do Meio River
- Camboriú River
- Tijucas River
  - Do Braço River
    - Alto Braço River
  - Do Engano River
- Biguaçu River
- Ratones River (on Santa Catarina Island)
- Tavares River (on Santa Catarina Island)
- Imaruí River (Marium River)
- Cubatão River
  - Vargem do Braço River
- D'Una River
- Tubarão River
  - Capivari River
  - Braço do Norte River
    - Pequeno River
    - Do Meio River
    - Povoamento River
  - Laranjeiras River
- Urussanga River
- Araranguá River
  - Dos Porcos River
  - Mãe Luzia River
    - Manoel Alves River
      - Morto River
    - Do Cedro River
    - São Bento River
  - Itoupava River
    - Jundiá River
    - Amola-Faca River
    - Da Pedra River
      - Pinheirinho River
- Mampituba River
  - Canoas River (Sertão River)
    - Leão River

=== Uruguay Basin ===
- Uruguay River
  - Peperiguaçu River
    - Das Flores River
      - Do Indio River
    - Mario Preta River
  - Macaco Branco River
  - Lajeado Macuco
  - Das Antas River
    - Sargento River
      - Catundó River
    - Capetinga River
    - Jacutinga River
  - Iracema River
  - São Domingos River
    - Lajeado Sertão
  - Barra Grande River
  - Chapecó River
    - Saudades River
    - Burro Branco River
      - Pesqueiro River
        - Três Voltas River
          - Macaco River
    - Do Ouro River
    - Chapecozinho River
      - Do Mato River
    - Saudades River
      - Feliciano River
    - Vermelho River
  - Chalana River
  - Irani River
  - Ariranha River
  - Engano River
  - Jacutinga River
  - Rancho Grande River
  - Do Peixe River
    - Do Leão River
    - São Bento River
      - Santo Antônio River
    - Quinze de Novembro River
      - São Pedro River
    - Preto River
  - Lajeado Agudo
  - Canoas River
    - Santa Cruz River
    - Inferno Grande River
      - São João River
    - Caveiras River
      - Amola-Faca River
    - Do Pinto River
    - Marombas River
      - Correntes River
        - Mansinho River
        - Bonito River (Timbó River)
      - Das Pedras River
    - Tributo River
    - Dos Indios River
    - Desquite River
    - Do Filipe River
    - Palheiro River
    - João Paulo River
      - Bom Retiro River
        - Campo Novo do Sul River
  - Pelotas River
    - Dos Portões River
    - Vacas Gordas River
    - Pelotinhas River
    - Lava-Tudo River
      - São Mateus River
      - Antoninha River
      - Da Divisa River
      - Sumidouro River
    - Das Contas River
      - Capivaras River
      - Púlpito River

=== Paraná Basin ===
- Paraná River (Argentina)
  - Iguazu River
    - Jangada River
    - Timbó River
      - Timbozinho River
      - Dos Pardos River
      - Bonito River
      - Tamanduá River
      - Cachoeira River
      - Caçador Grande River
    - Paciência River
    - Negro River
      - Canoinhas River
        - Bonito River
      - São João River
      - Negrinho River
      - Preto River
        - Bituva River

== Alphabetically ==
- Lajeado Agudo
- Alto Braço River
- Amola-Faca River
- Amola-Faca River
- Das Antas River
- Antoninha River
- Araranguá River
- Ariranha River
- Barra Grande River
- Baú River
- Benedito River
- Biguaçu River
- Bituva River
- Bom Retiro River
- Bonito River
- Bonito River (Timbó River)
- Bonito River
- Braço do Norte River
- Do Braço River
- Burro Branco River
- Caçador Grande River
- Cachoeira River
- Camboriú River
- Campo Novo do Sul River
- Canoas River (Sertão River)
- Canoas River
- Canoinhas River
- Capetinga River
- Capivaras River
- Capivari River
- Catundó River
- Caveiras River
- Do Cedro River
- Dos Cedros River
- Chalana River
- Chapecó River
- Chapecozinho River
- Das Contas River
- Correntes River
- Cubatão River
- Cubatão River
- Desquite River
- Da Divisa River
- D'Una River
- Engano River
- Engano River
- Do Engano River
- Feliciano River
- Do Filipe River
- Das Flores River
- Garcia River
- Humboldt River
- Iguazu River
- Imaruí River (Marium River)
- Do Indio River
- Dos Indios River
- Dos Indios River
- Inferno Grande River
- Iracema River
- Irani River
- Iraputã River
- Itajaí-Açu River
- Itajaí-Mirim River
- Itajaí do Norte River
- Itajaí do Oeste River
- Itajaí do Sul River
- Itapoçu River
- Itapocuzinho River
- Itoupava River
- Jacutinga River
- Jacutinga River
- Jangada River
- João Paulo River
- Jundiá River
- Lajeado Sertão
- Laranjeiras River
- Lava-Tudo River
- Leão River
- Do Leão River
- Luís Alves River
- Macaco River
- Macaco Branco River
- Lajeado Macuco
- Mãe Luzia River
- Mampituba River
- Mansinho River
- Manoel Alves River
- Mario Preta River
- Marombas River
- Do Mato River
- Do Meio River
- Do Meio River
- Morto River
- Negrinho River
- Negro River
- Novo River
- Da Onça River
- Do Ouro River
- Paciência River
- Palheiro River
- Palmital River
- Dos Pardos River
- Da Pedra River
- Das Pedras River
- Do Peixe River
- Pelotas River
- Pelotinhas River
- Peperiguaçu River
- Pequeno River
- Perimbó River
- Pesqueiro River
- Pinheirinho River
- Do Pinto River
- Pirabeiraba River
- Piraí River
- Das Pombas River
- Dos Porcos River
- Dos Portões River
- Povoamento River
- Da Prata River
- Preto River
- Preto River
- Púlpito River
- Quinze de Novembro River
- Rancho Grande River
- Ratones River
- Santa Cruz River
- Santo Antônio River
- São Bento River
- São Bento River
- São Domingos River
- São João River
- São João River
- São Mateus River
- São Pedro River
- Sargento River
- Saudades River
- Saudades River
- Sumidouro River
- Taió River
- Tamanduá River
- Tavares River
- Tijucas River
- Timbó River
- Timbozinho River
- Três Barras River
- Três Voltas River
- Tributo River
- Trombudo River
- Tubarão River
- Uruguay River
- Urussanga River
- Vacas Gordas River
- Vargem do Braço River
- Vermelho River
