= Camboriú River =

Location
- Country: Brazil

Physical characteristics
- Source
  - location: Santa Catarina state
- Mouth: Atlantic Ocean
  - coordinates: 27°0′S 48°36′W

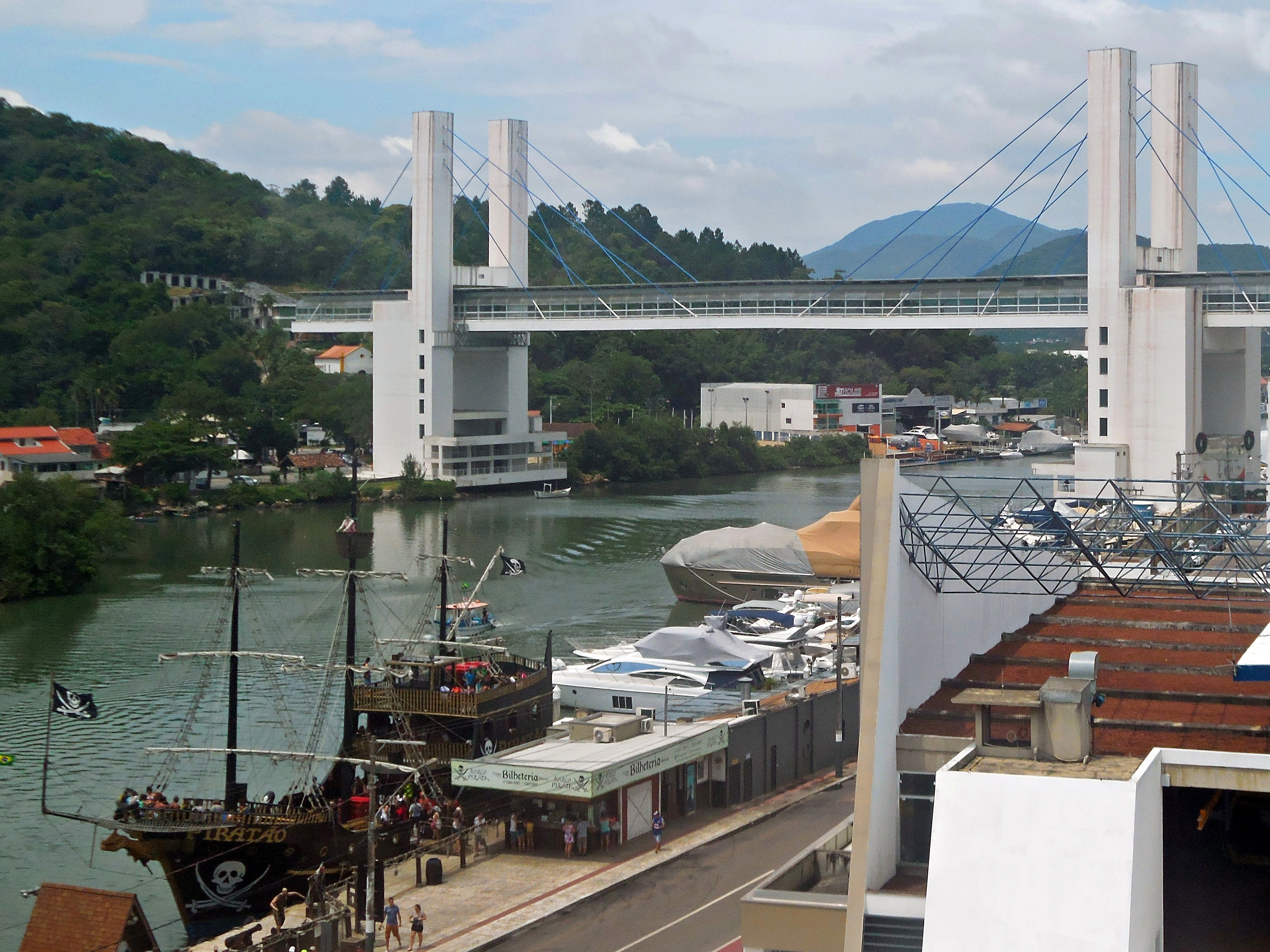
Camboriú River, Balneário Camboriú, Santa Catarina, Brazil.

The Camboriú River is a river of Santa Catarina state in southeastern Brazil.

== See also ==
- List of rivers of Santa Catarina
