= Canoas River (Mampituba River tributary) =

Canoas River Sertão River

Location
- Country: Brazil

Physical characteristics
- Source
  - location: Santa Catarina state
- Mouth: Mampituba River
  - coordinates: 29°17′S 49°48′W

The Canoas River, also known as Sertão River, is a river of Santa Catarina state in southeastern Brazil. It is one of two branches formed by the Praia Grande River, which recombine to form the Mampituba.

== See also ==
- List of rivers of Santa Catarina
