= Dos Indios River (Itajaí River tributary) =

Location
- Country: Brazil

Physical characteristics
- Source
  - location: Santa Catarina state
- Mouth: Itajaí do Norte River
  - coordinates: 27°2′S 49°35′W

The Dos Indios River is a river of Santa Catarina state in southeastern Brazil. It is a tributary of the Itajaí do Norte River.

== See also ==
- List of rivers of Santa Catarina
