= Sargento River =

Coordinates: 26°45′58″S 53°21′48″W

Location
- Country: Brazil

Physical characteristics
- Source
  - location: Santa Catarina state

The Sargento River is a river of Santa Catarina state in southeastern Brazil. It is a tributary of the Das Antas River, which is part of the Uruguay River basin.

== See also ==
- List of rivers of Santa Catarina
