= Ratones River =

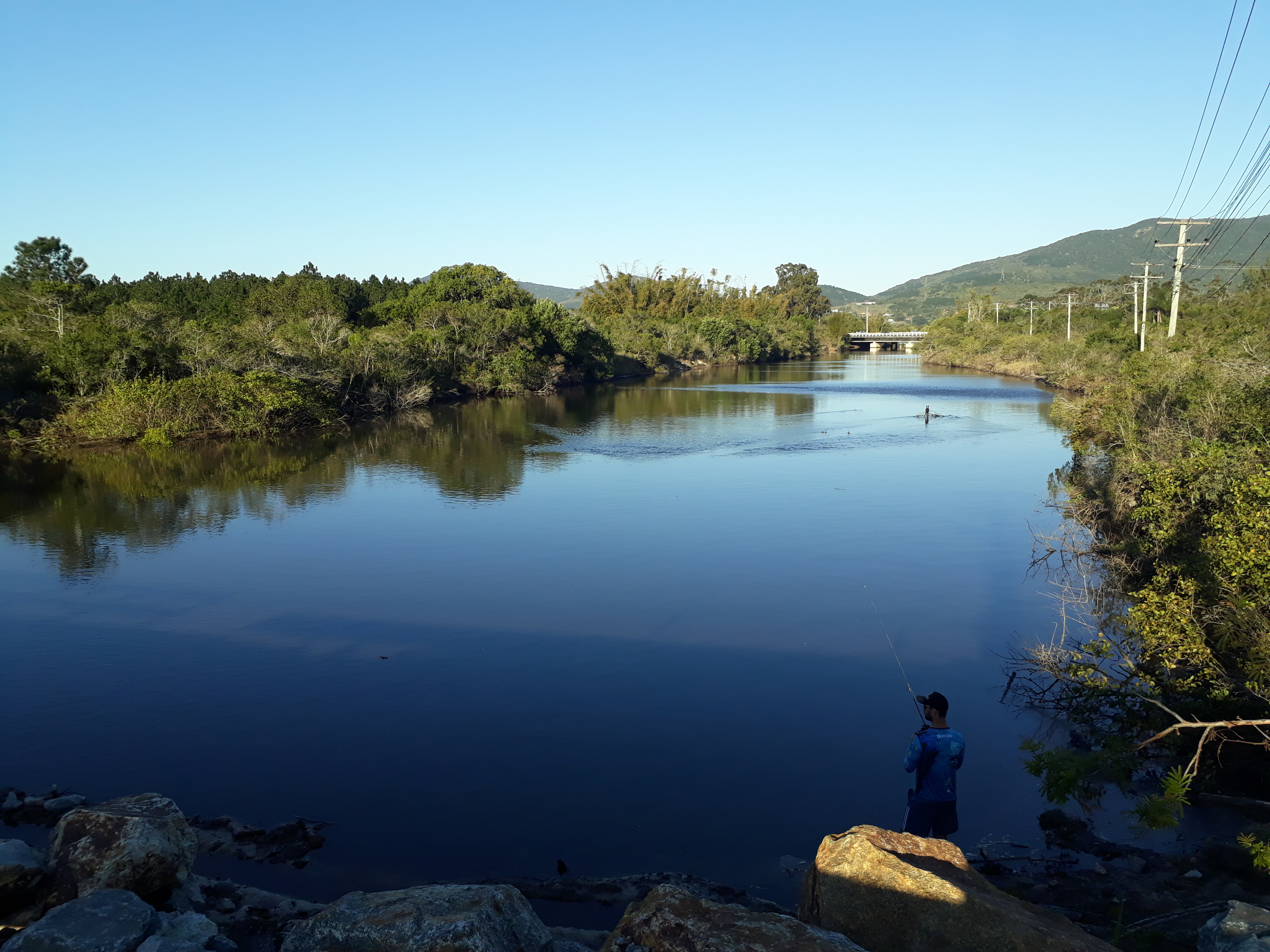

Location
- Country: Brazil

Physical characteristics
- Source
  - location: Santa Catarina state
- Mouth: Baia Norte
  - coordinates: 27°28′S 48°30′W

The Ratones River is a river on Santa Catarina Island, in Santa Catarina state in southeastern Brazil.

== See also ==
- List of rivers of Santa Catarina
