= Burro Branco River =

Location
- Country: Brazil

Physical characteristics
- Source
  - location: Santa Catarina state
- Mouth: Chapecó River
  - coordinates: 26°54′S 52°51′W

The Burro Branco River is a river of Santa Catarina state in southeastern Brazil. It is a tributary of the Chapecó River, part of the Uruguay River basin.

== See also ==
- List of rivers of Santa Catarina
