= Manuel Alves River (Santa Catarina) =

Location
- Country: Brazil

Physical characteristics
- Source
  - location: Santa Catarina state
- Mouth: Mãe Luzia River
  - coordinates: 28°52′S 49°31′W

The Manuel Alves River is a river of Santa Catarina state in southeastern Brazil.

== See also ==
- List of rivers of Santa Catarina
