= Lajeado Macuco River =

Lajeado Macuco

Location
- Country: Brazil

Physical characteristics
- Source
  - location: Santa Catarina state
- Mouth: Uruguay River
  - coordinates: 27°11′S 53°34′W

The Lajeado Macuco is a river of Santa Catarina state in southeastern Brazil. It is part of the Uruguay River basin.

== See also ==
- List of rivers of Santa Catarina
