= Dos Indios River (Canoas River tributary) =

Location
- Country: Brazil

Physical characteristics
- Source
  - location: Santa Catarina state
- Mouth: Canoas River
  - coordinates: 27°31′S 50°16′W

The Dos Indios River is a river of Santa Catarina state in southeastern Brazil. It is part of the Uruguay River basin and is a tributary of the Canoas River.

== See also ==
- List of rivers of Santa Catarina
