= Amola-Faca River (Caveiras River tributary) =

Do Amola Faca River

Location
- Country: Brazil

Physical characteristics
- Source
  - location: Santa Catarina state
- Mouth: Caveiras River
  - coordinates: 27°47′S 50°30′W

The Do Amola Faca River is a river of Santa Catarina state in southeastern Brazil. It is part of the Uruguay River basin.

== See also ==
- List of rivers of Santa Catarina
