= Pesqueiro River =

Location
- Country: Brazil

Physical characteristics
- Source
  - location: Santa Catarina state
- Mouth: Burro Branco River
  - coordinates: 26°47′S 52°56′W

The Pesqueiro River is a river of Santa Catarina state in southeastern Brazil. It is a tributary of the Burro Branco River, part of the Uruguay River basin.

== See also ==
- List of rivers of Santa Catarina
