= Barra Velha =

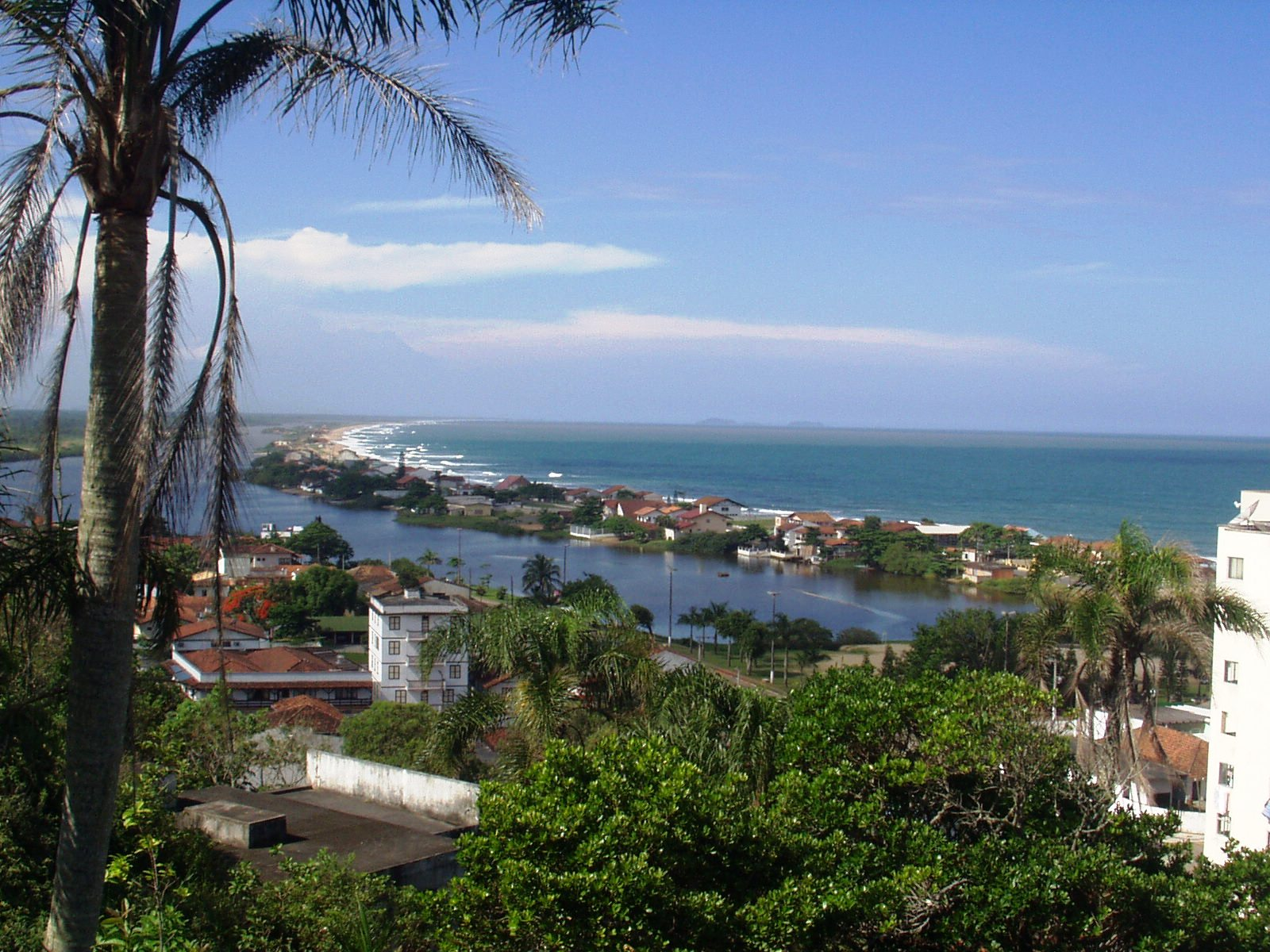
- View of Lake from Summit

- Flag Coat of arms

- Location within Brazil
- Coordinates: 26°36′56″S 48°41′05″W
- Country: Brazil
- Region: Southern
- State: (Santa Catarina (state)) Santa Catarina
- Incorporated: December 7, 1961

Government
  - Mayor: Douglas Elias da Costa (PL)

Area
  - Total: 142.4 km^{2} (55.0 sq mi)

Population (2020)
  - Total: 29,860
  - Density: 127.8/km^{2} (331/sq mi)
- Time zone: UTC−3 (UTC-3, BRT)
- HDI (2000): 0.792
- Website: www.barravelha.sc.gov.br

Barra Velha is a resort town and county seat of about 30,000 inhabitants in the Northern region of Santa Catarina, Brazil. Its nine beaches extend from the Rio Itapocu in the North to the resort town of Piçarras on its Southern border. Additionally, it is the only resort in the area to have a freshwater lake separated from the ocean by an old sand bar, from which it derives its name.

Located between Joinville and Itajaí on BR-101, the principal north–south highway in Southern Brazil, it is an important resort destination for residents of the industrial region to the North and West of the State, with summer weekend population exceeding 100,000.

Settled initially by Azorian whale fishermen in 1812, it retains its fishing village characteristics with boats drawn up onto the beach and the daily catch sold directly from them by the fishermen every morning. In the center of downtown a hill rises sharply from the beach which provides views of the lake and town center. A replica of the statute of Christ on Corcovado rises from the summit.

Barra Velha is home of the annual "Festa Nacional do Pirão", a festival celebrating the Azorian dish "Pirão" having a sauce-like consistency and normally made from fish or shellfish. Held in early September, it attracts over 30,000 visitors annually.
