= Chapecozinho River =

- Location within Brazil
- Native name: Rio Chapecozinho (Portuguese)

Location
- Country: Brazil

Physical characteristics
- Source
  - location: Santa Catarina state
- Mouth
  - coordinates: 26.771111°S 52.6225°W

Basin features
- River system: Chapecó River

The Chapecozinho River is a river of Santa Catarina state in southeastern Brazil. It is part of the Uruguay River basin. It is a tributary of the Chapecó River.

The river is fed by streams rising in the Araucárias National Park, a 12,841 hectares (31,730 acres) conservation unit created in 2005.

== See also ==
- List of rivers of Santa Catarina
