= Dos Portões River =

Location
- Country: Brazil

Physical characteristics
- Source
  - location: Santa Catarina state
- Mouth: Pelotas River
  - coordinates: 27°48′S 51°8′W

The Dos Portões River is a river of Santa Catarina state in southeastern Brazil. It is part of the Uruguay River basin and a tributary of the Pelotas River.

== See also ==
- List of rivers of Santa Catarina
