= Irani River =

Coordinates: 27°14′23″S 52°32′38″W

Location
- Country: Brazil

Physical characteristics
- Source
  - location: Santa Catarina state
- Mouth
  - location: Uruguay River

The Irani River (Portuguese, Rio Irani) is a river of Santa Catarina state in southeastern Brazil. It is a tributary of the Uruguay River.

== See also ==
- List of rivers of Santa Catarina
- Tributaries of the Río de la Plata
