= Da Pedra River =

Location
- Country: Brazil

Physical characteristics
- Source
  - location: Santa Catarina state
- Mouth: Itoupava River
  - coordinates: 28°58′S 49°41′W

The Da Pedra River is a river of Santa Catarina state in southeastern Brazil. It joins with the Amola-Faca River to form the Itoupava River.

== See also ==
- List of rivers of Santa Catarina
