= Inferno Grande River =

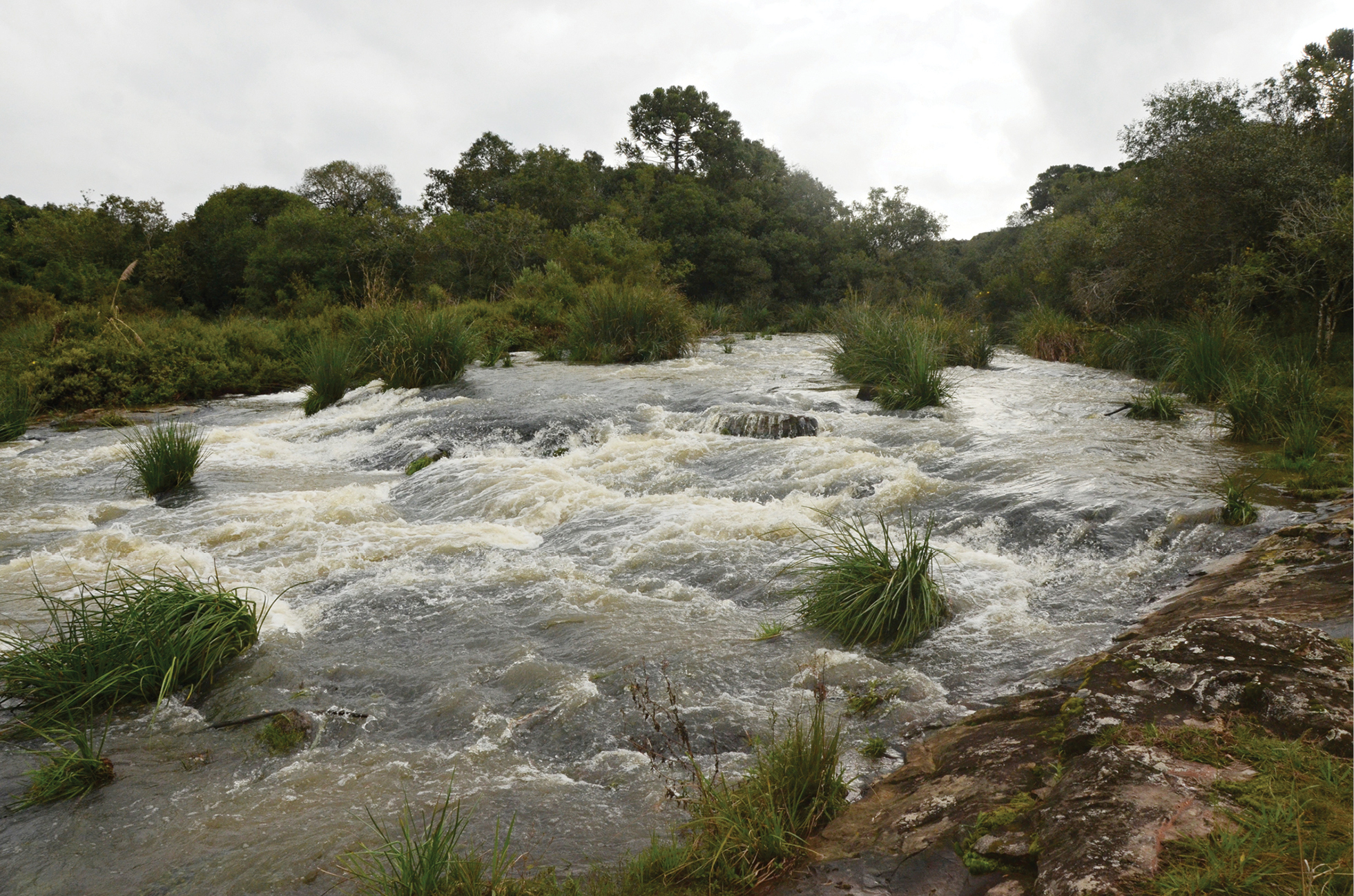

Location
- Country: Brazil

Physical characteristics
- Source
  - location: Santa Catarina state
- Mouth: Canoas River
  - coordinates: 27°36′S 51°13′W

The Inferno Grande River is a river of Santa Catarina state in southeastern Brazil. It is a tributary of the Canoas River, part of the Uruguay River basin.

== See also ==
- List of rivers of Santa Catarina
