= Caveiras River =

Location
- Country: Brazil

Physical characteristics
- Source
  - location: Santa Catarina state
- Mouth: Canoas River
  - coordinates: 27°35′S 50°56′W

The Caveiras River is a river of Santa Catarina state in southeastern Brazil. It is part of the Uruguay River basin.

The river rises above 1300m, in the Serra Geral, in the municipality of Painel. It is an important river for supplying the city of Lages, passing to the south and west of which the Caveiras dam is located.

It flows westwards, empties into the Canoas River, close to the municipality of Abdon Batista.

The Caveiras River basin starts in the region of the municipality of Panel, passes through Lages, until it flows into the Canoas river, in the region of Salto dos Marianos in São José do Cerrito. In the urban perimeter of Lages, the basin is also composed of the Ponte Grande and Carahá rivers.

== See also ==
- List of rivers of Santa Catarina
