= Tijucas River =

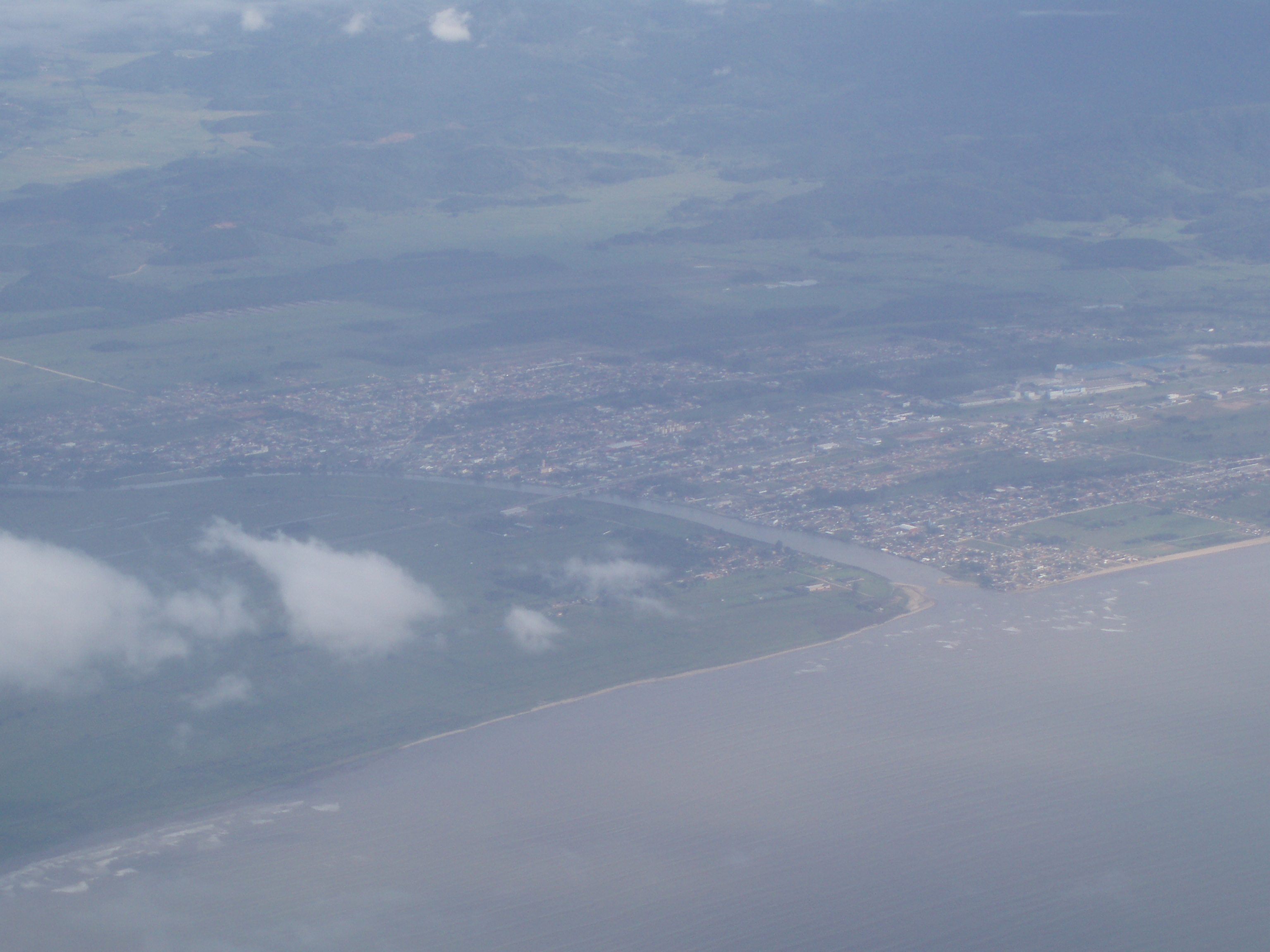

Location
- Country: Brazil

Physical characteristics
- Source
  - location: Santa Catarina state
- Mouth: Atlantic Ocean
  - coordinates: 27°14′S 48°38′W

The Tijucas River is a river of Santa Catarina state in southeastern Brazil.

== See also ==
- List of rivers of Santa Catarina
