= Mampituba River =

Coordinates: 29°19′32″S 49°42′45″W

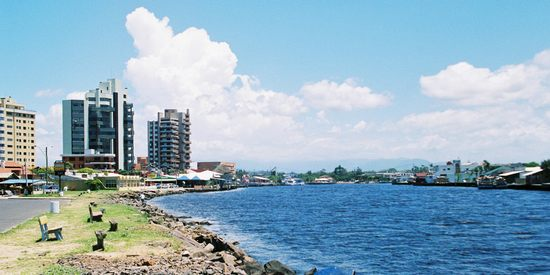

Location
- Country: Brazil

Physical characteristics
- Source
  - location: Santa Catarina state

The Mampituba River is a river forming part of the boundary between Santa Catarina and Rio Grande do Sul states in southeastern Brazil.

== See also ==
- List of rivers of Santa Catarina
- List of rivers of Rio Grande do Sul
