= Marombas River =

Coordinates: 27°25′18″S 50°45′16″W

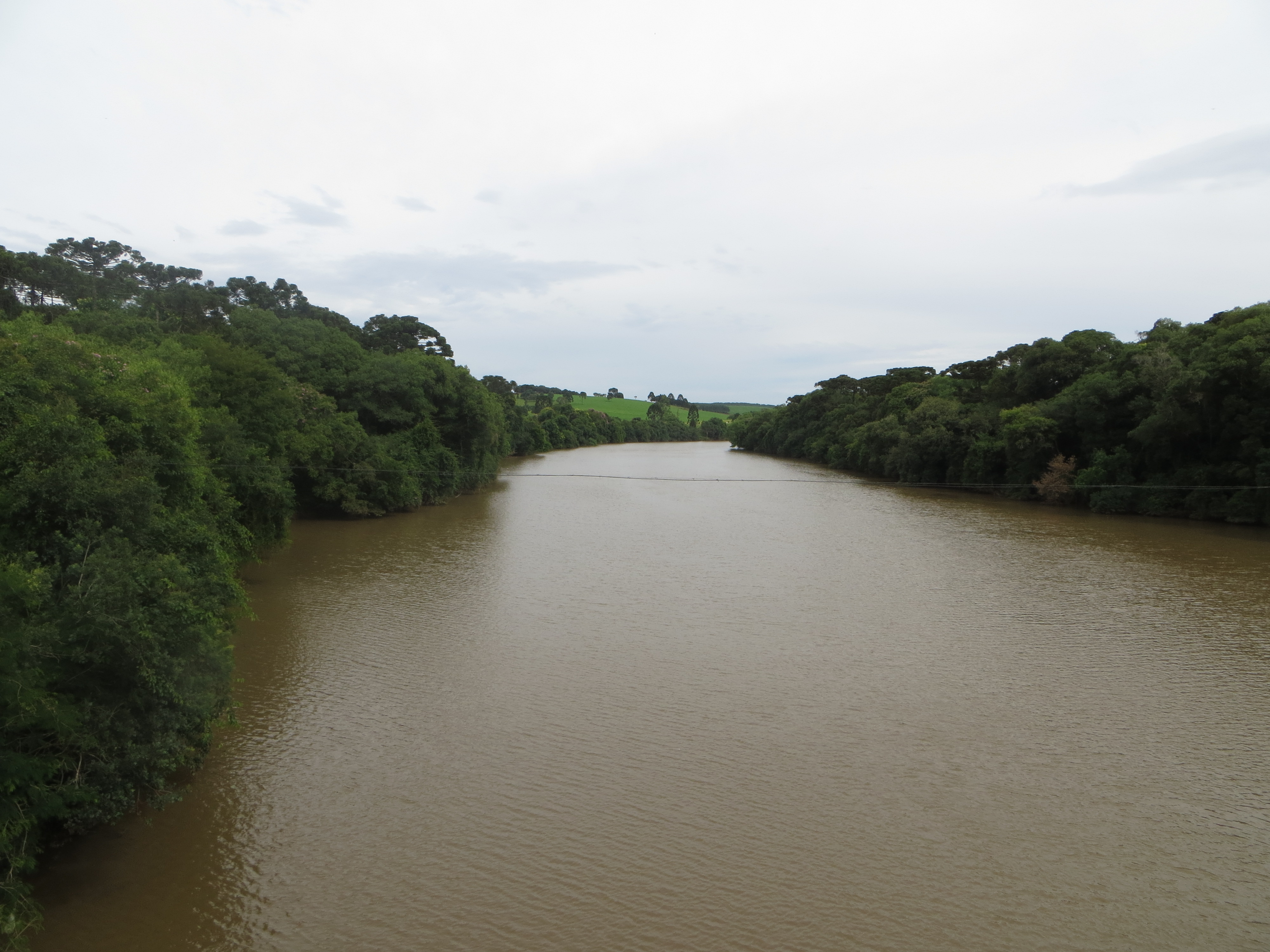

Location
- Country: Brazil

Physical characteristics
- Source
  - location: Santa Catarina state
- Mouth
  - location: Canoas River

The Marombas River (Portuguese, Rio Marombas) is a river of Santa Catarina state in southeastern Brazil. It is a tributary of the Canoas River and part of the Uruguay River basin.

== See also ==
- List of rivers of Santa Catarina
- Tributaries of the Río de la Plata
