= Das Contas River =

River in Brazil

Location
- Country: Brazil

Physical characteristics
- Mouth: Pelotas River
  - coordinates: 28°27′S 49°48′W

The Das Contas River is a river on the border between Santa Catarina and Rio Grande do Sul states in southeastern Brazil. It is a tributary of the Pelotas River.

== See also ==
- List of rivers of Santa Catarina
