= Palmital River (Santa Catarina) =

Location
- Country: Brazil

Physical characteristics
- Source
  - location: Santa Catarina state
- Mouth: Atlantic Ocean
  - coordinates: 26°14′S 48°45′W

The Palmital River is a river of Santa Catarina state in south-eastern Brazil.

== See also ==
- List of rivers of Santa Catarina
