= Pepiri-Guazu River =

Coordinates: 27°10′S 53°50′W

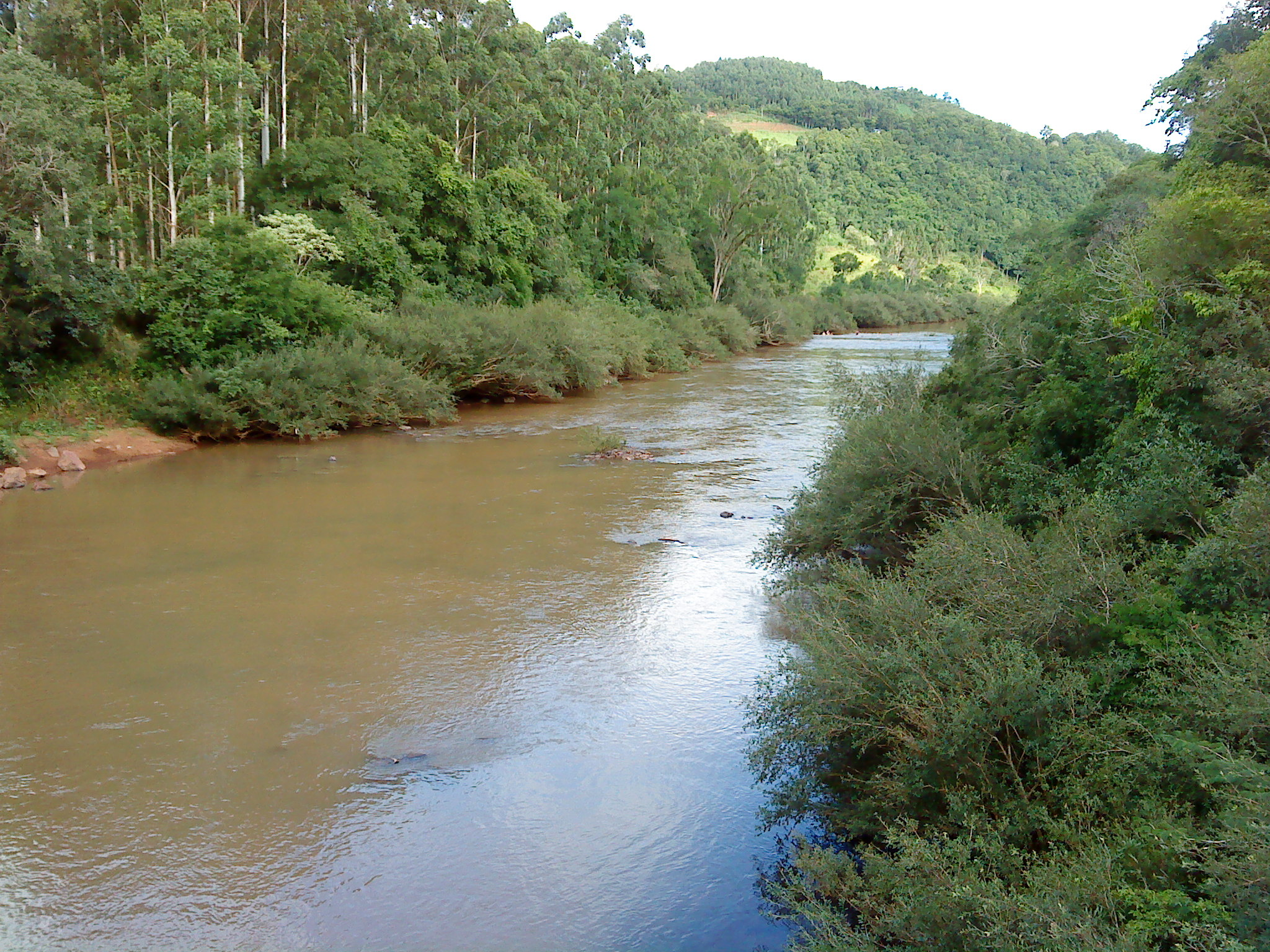

Location
- Countries: Argentina and Brazil

Physical characteristics
- Source
  - location: Dionísio Cerqueira
- Mouth
  - location: Uruguay River

The Pepiri-Guazu River (Spanish Río Pepirí Guazú, Portuguese Rio Peperi Guaçu) is a river of Argentina and the Santa Catarina state in southeastern Brazil. Its course forms a short portion of the international border between Argentina and Brazil. It flows from north to south into the Uruguay River.

== See also ==
- List of rivers of Argentina
- List of rivers of Santa Catarina
