= Itapocu River =

Coordinates: 26°34′S 48°40′W

Location
- Country: Brazil

Physical characteristics
- Source
  - location: Santa Catarina state

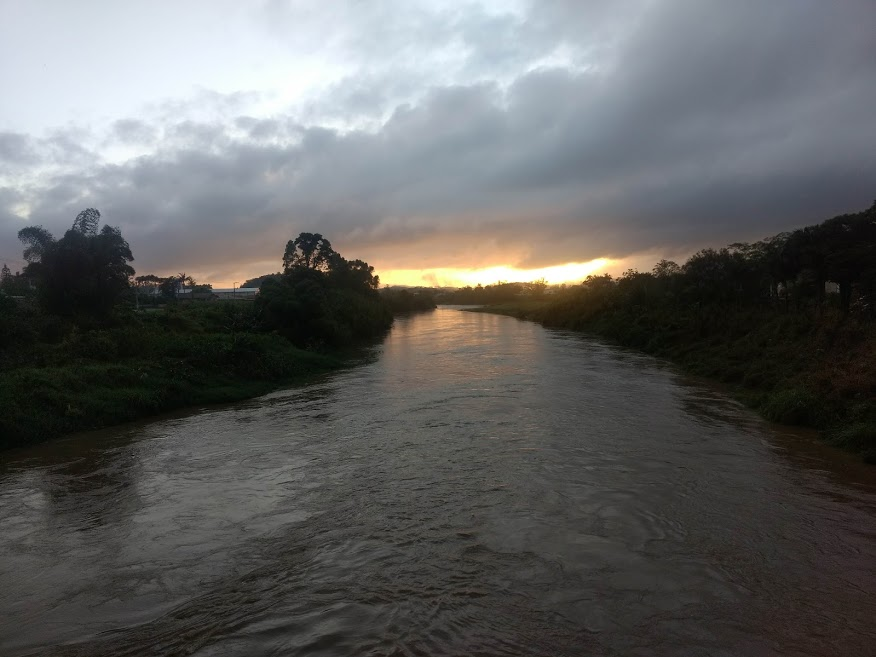

The Itapocu River flows eastward from the planalto or highlands of Northeastern Santa Catarina, Brazil, to the Atlantic Ocean. Passing through the industrial city of Jaraguá do Sul, it feeds a lake in Barra Velha before reaching the sea. At its terminus, it forms the boundary between the municipalities of Barra Velha and Araquarí.

== See also ==
- List of rivers of Santa Catarina
