= Itajaí do Norte River =

Location
- Country: Brazil

Physical characteristics
- Source
  - location: Santa Catarina state
- Mouth: Itajaí-Açu River
  - coordinates: 27°4′S 49°29′W

The Itajaí do Norte River is a river of Santa Catarina state in southeastern Brazil.

== See also ==
- List of rivers of Santa Catarina
