= Araranguá River =

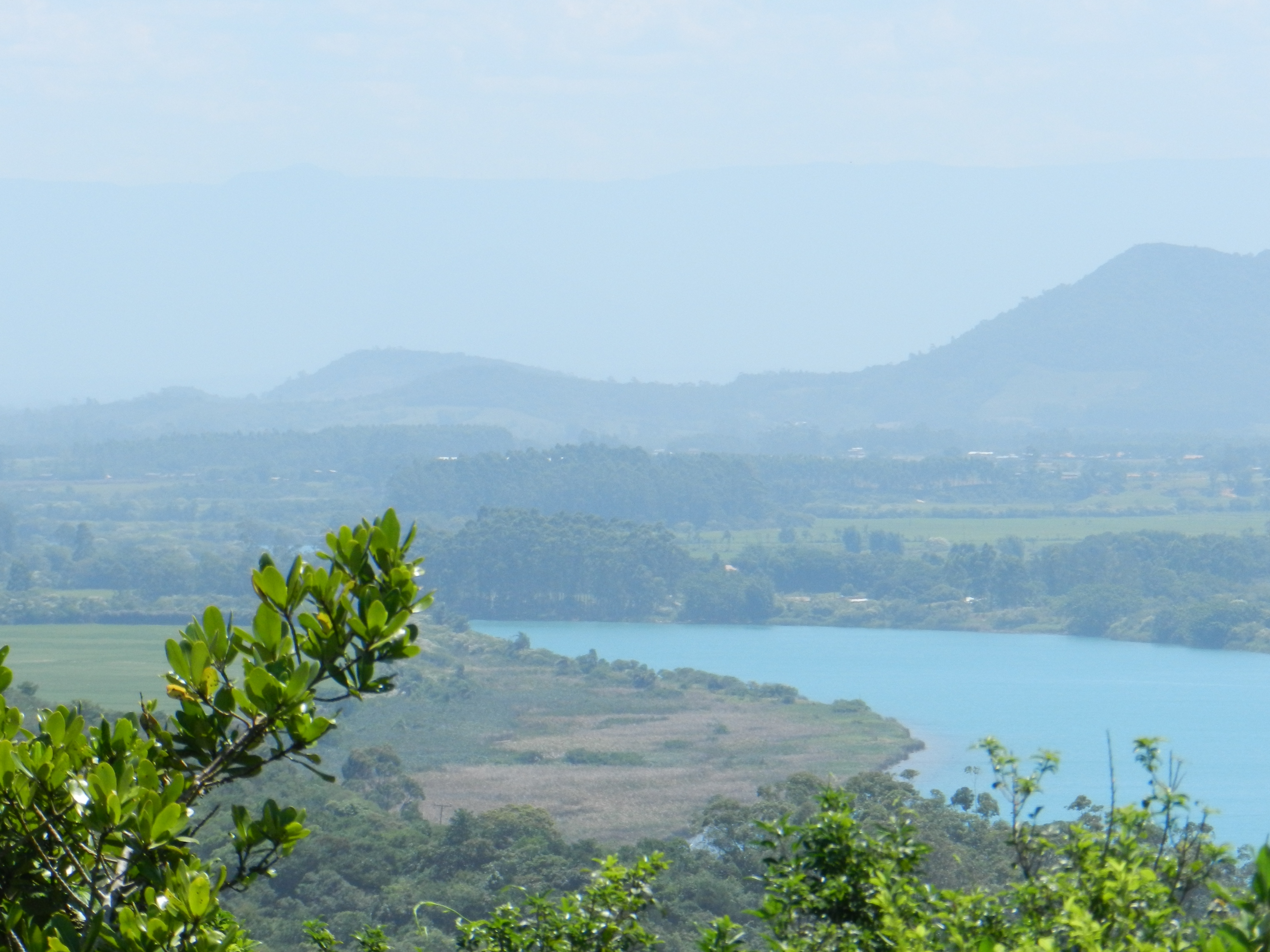

Location
- Country: Brazil

Physical characteristics
- Source
  - location: Santa Catarina state
- Mouth: Atlantic Ocean
  - coordinates: 28°52′S 49°18′W

The Araranguá River is a river of Santa Catarina state in southeastern Brazil.

== History ==
One of the earliest documented attestation of the river, still bearing the name of Ararunga, was cited by João Teixeira Albernaz. The origin of this name remains unknown to this date.

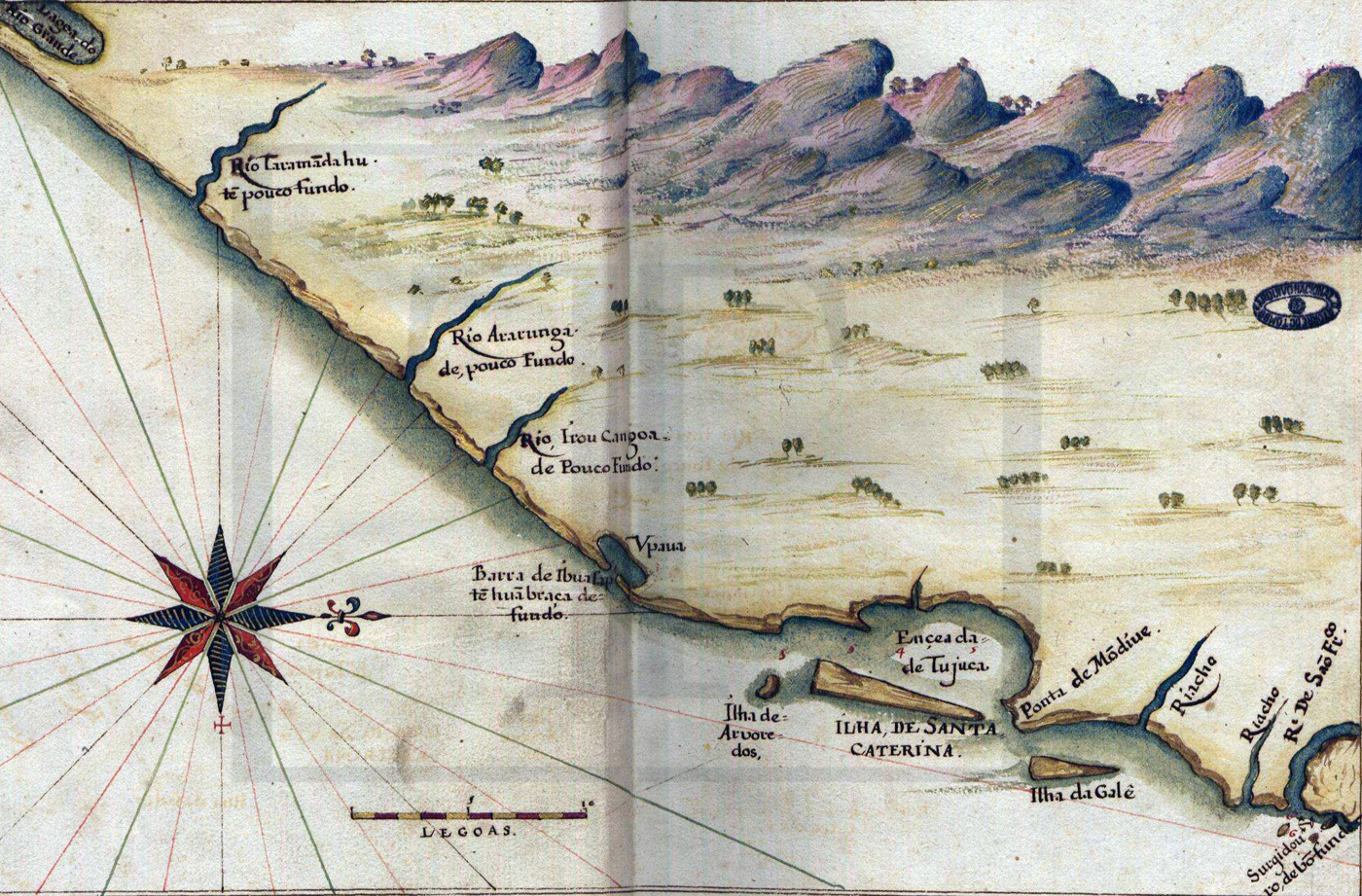
Map of southern Santa Catarina coastal line in 1640 as documented by João Teixeira Albernaz

== See also ==
- List of rivers of Santa Catarina
