= Braço do Norte River =

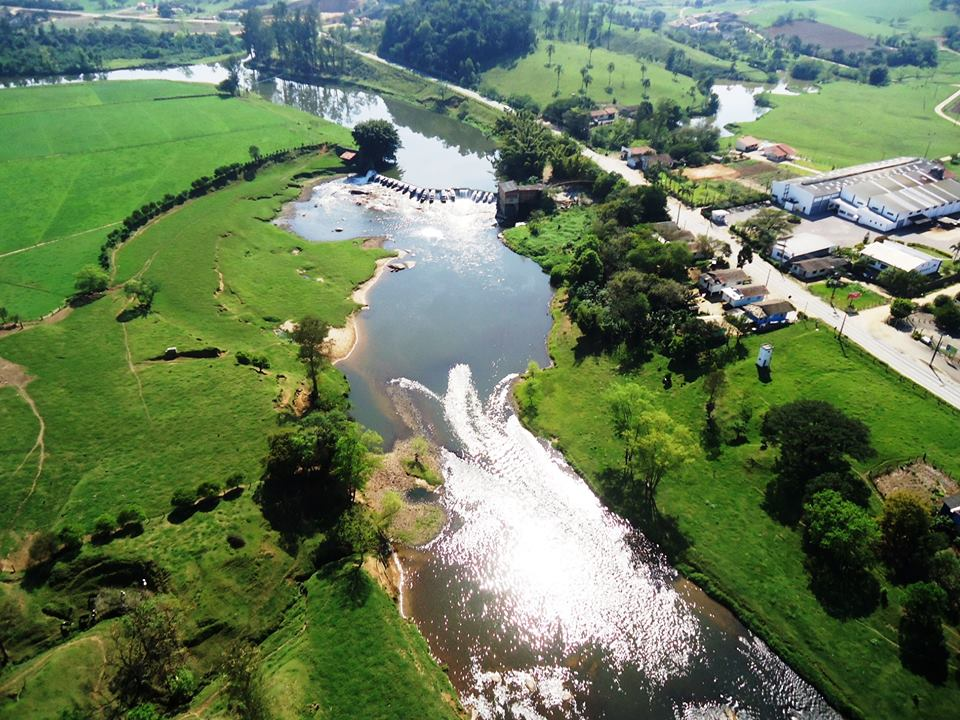

Location
- Country: Brazil

Physical characteristics
- Source
  - location: Santa Catarina state
- Mouth: Tubarão River
  - coordinates: 28°25′S 49°8′W

The Braço do Norte River is a river of Santa Catarina state in southeastern Brazil.

== See also ==
- List of rivers of Santa Catarina
