= Das Antas River (Santa Catarina) =

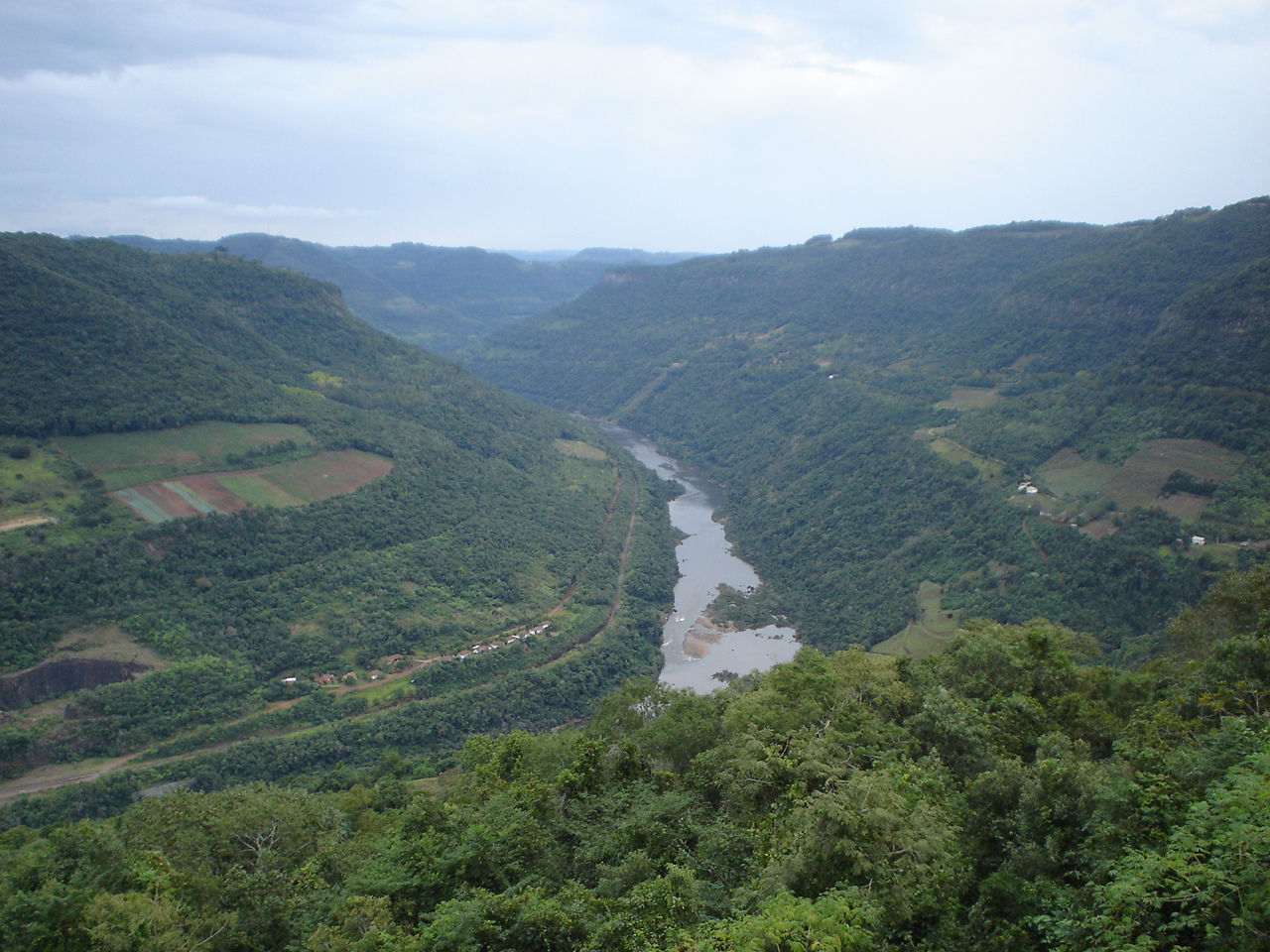

Location
- Country: Brazil

Physical characteristics
- Source
  - location: Santa Catarina state
- Mouth: Uruguay River
  - coordinates: 27°5′S 53°22′W

The Das Antas River is a river of Santa Catarina state in southeastern Brazil. It is part of the Uruguay River basin.

== See also ==
- List of rivers of Santa Catarina
