= Rio Negro (Paraná) =

River in Brazil

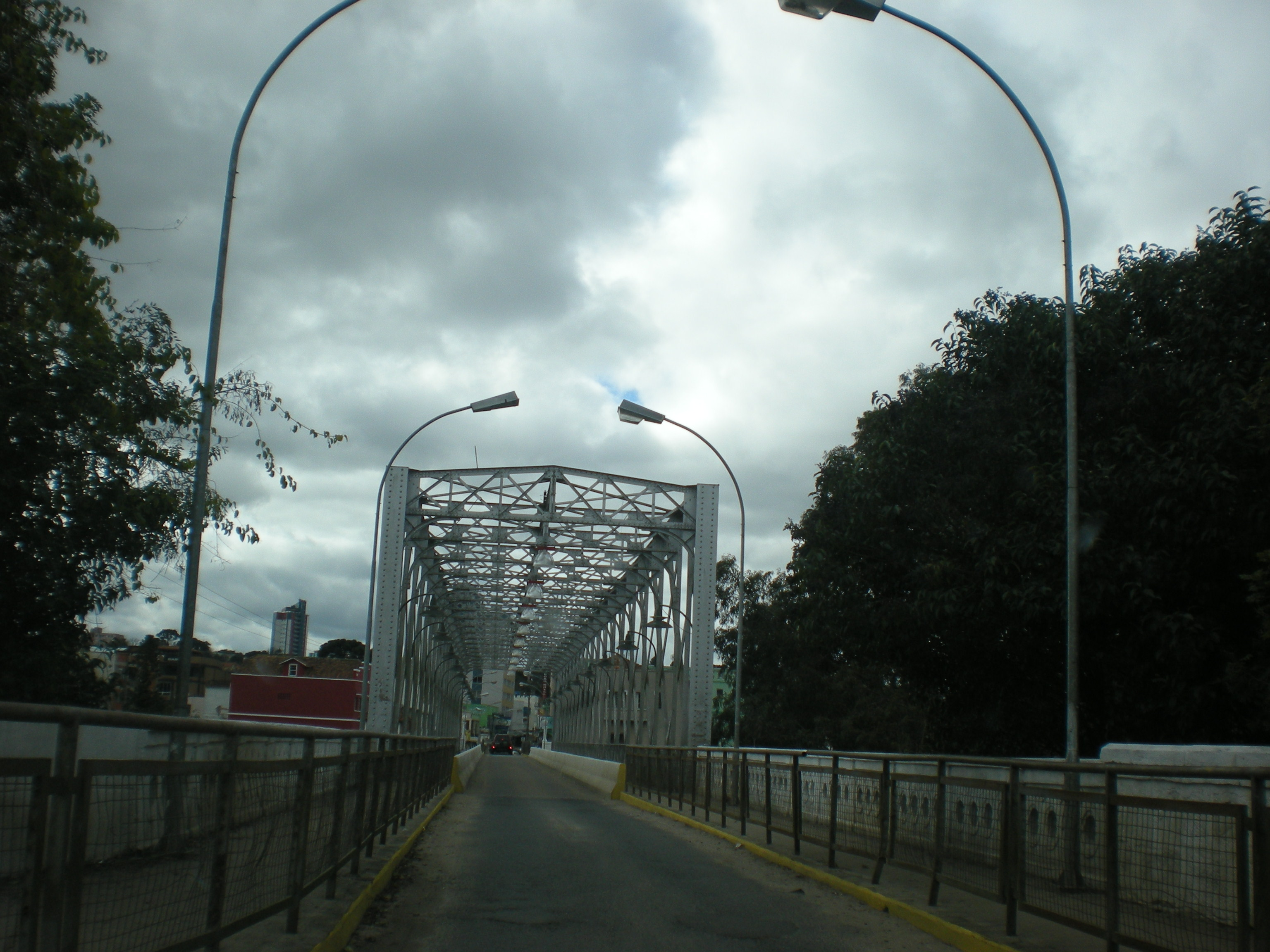

Location
- Country: Brazil

Physical characteristics
- Source
  - location: Santa Catarina state
- Mouth: Iguazu River
  - coordinates: 26°2′S 50°29′W

Rio Negro (Portuguese for "black river") is a river on the border between Paraná and Santa Catarina states in southeastern Brazil. It is part of the Paraná River basin, and a tributary of the Iguazu River.

== See also ==
- List of rivers of Santa Catarina
- List of rivers of Paraná
