= Do Peixe River (Santa Catarina) =

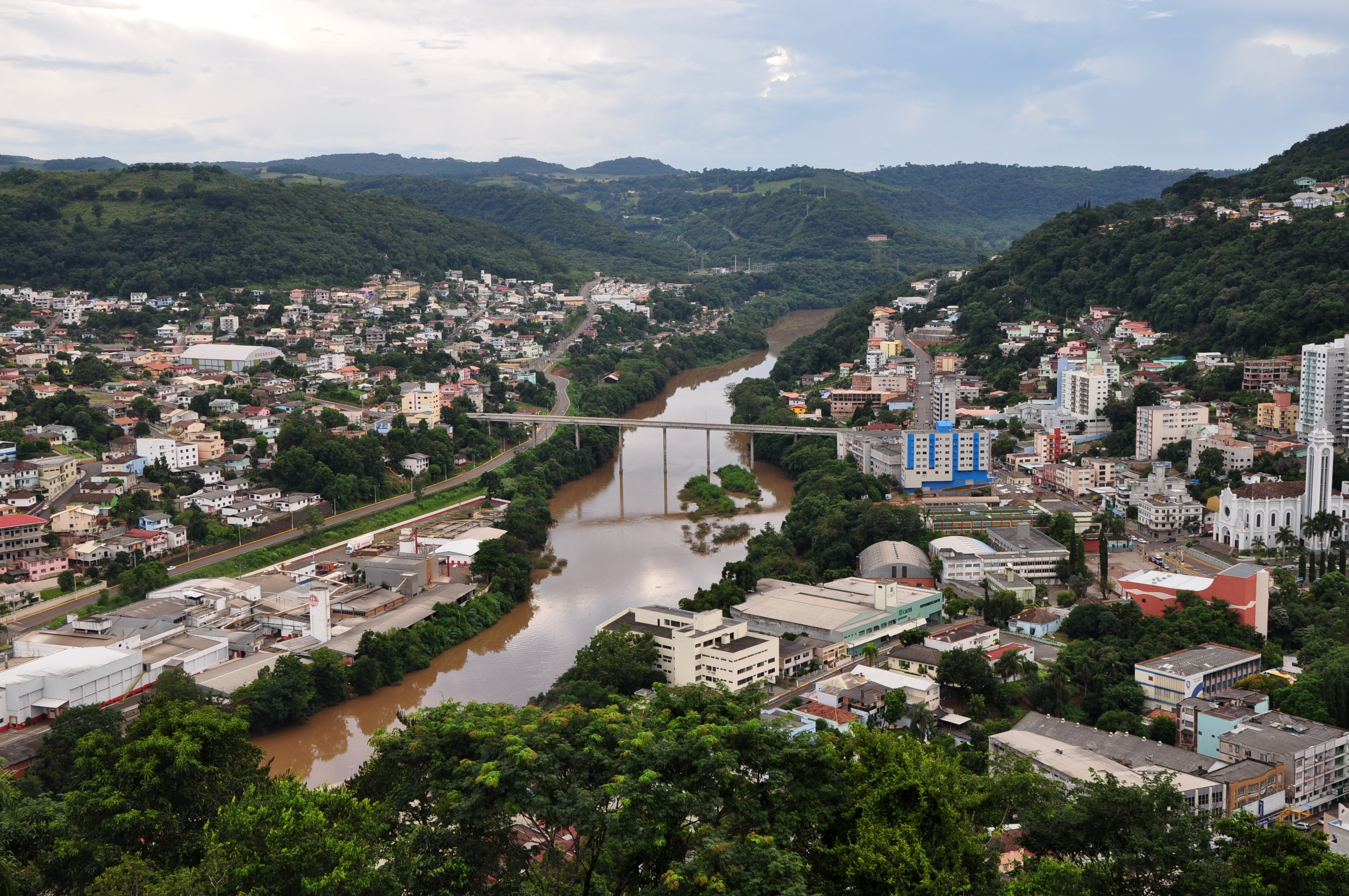

Location
- Country: Brazil

Physical characteristics
- Source
  - location: Santa Catarina state
  - elevation: 1,250 m (4,100 ft)
- Mouth: Uruguay River
  - coordinates: 27°28′S 51°54′W
  - elevation: 387 m (1,270 ft)
- Length: 249 km (155 mi)
- Basin size: 5,277 km^{2} (2,037 sq mi)

The Do Peixe River is a river of Santa Catarina state in southeastern Brazil. It is part of the Uruguay River basin.

== See also ==
- List of rivers of Santa Catarina
