= Chapecó River =

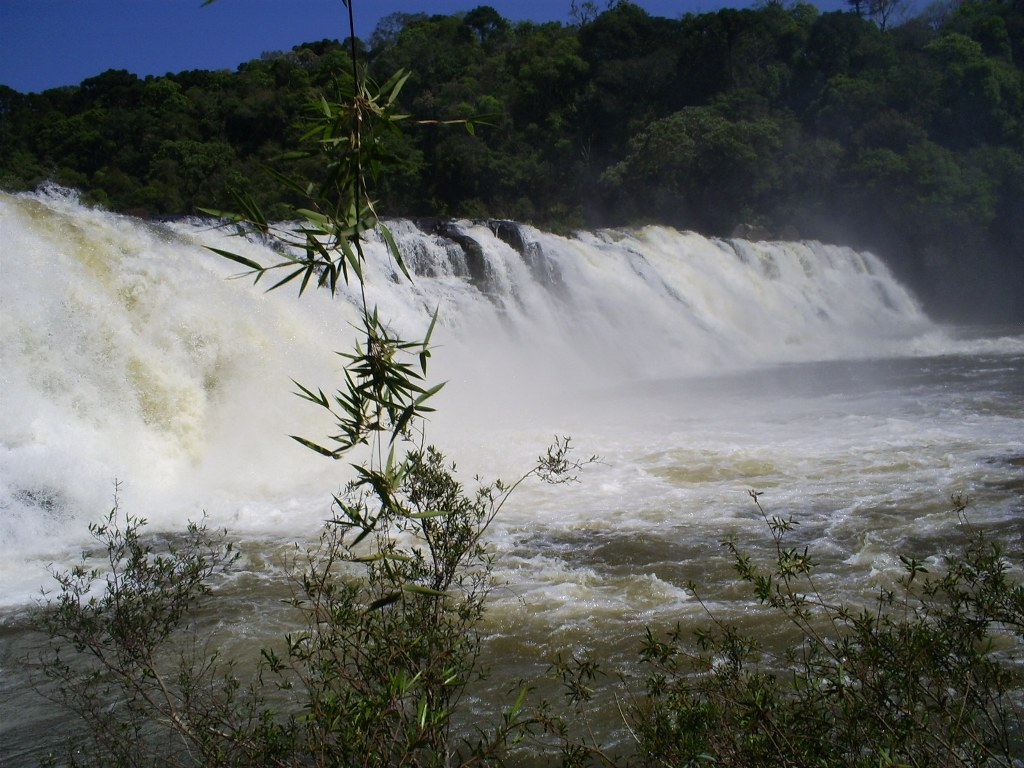

- Location within Brazil
- Native name: Rio Chapecó (Portuguese)

Location
- Country: Brazil

Physical characteristics
- Source
  - location: Santa Catarina state
- Mouth
  - location: Uruguay River
  - coordinates: 27.095256°S 53.015777°W

Basin features
- River system: Uruguay River

The Chapecó River (Portuguese, Rio Chapecó) is a river of Santa Catarina state in southeastern Brazil. It is a tributary of the Uruguay River.

The river is fed by streams rising in the Araucárias National Park, a 12,841 hectares (31,730 acres) conservation unit created in 2005. Other headwaters rise in the 6,566 hectares (16,220 acres) Mata Preta Ecological Station, a fully protected area created in 2005. The river supplies water to the municipality of Abelardo Luz, Santa Caterina. The Chapecó River Falls are one of the main attractions of the region.

== See also ==
- List of rivers of Santa Catarina
- Tributaries of the Río de la Plata
