= Timbó River =

Location
- Country: Brazil

Physical characteristics
- Source
  - location: Santa Catarina state
- Mouth
  - location: Iguazu River
  - coordinates: 26.2905°S 50.8981°W

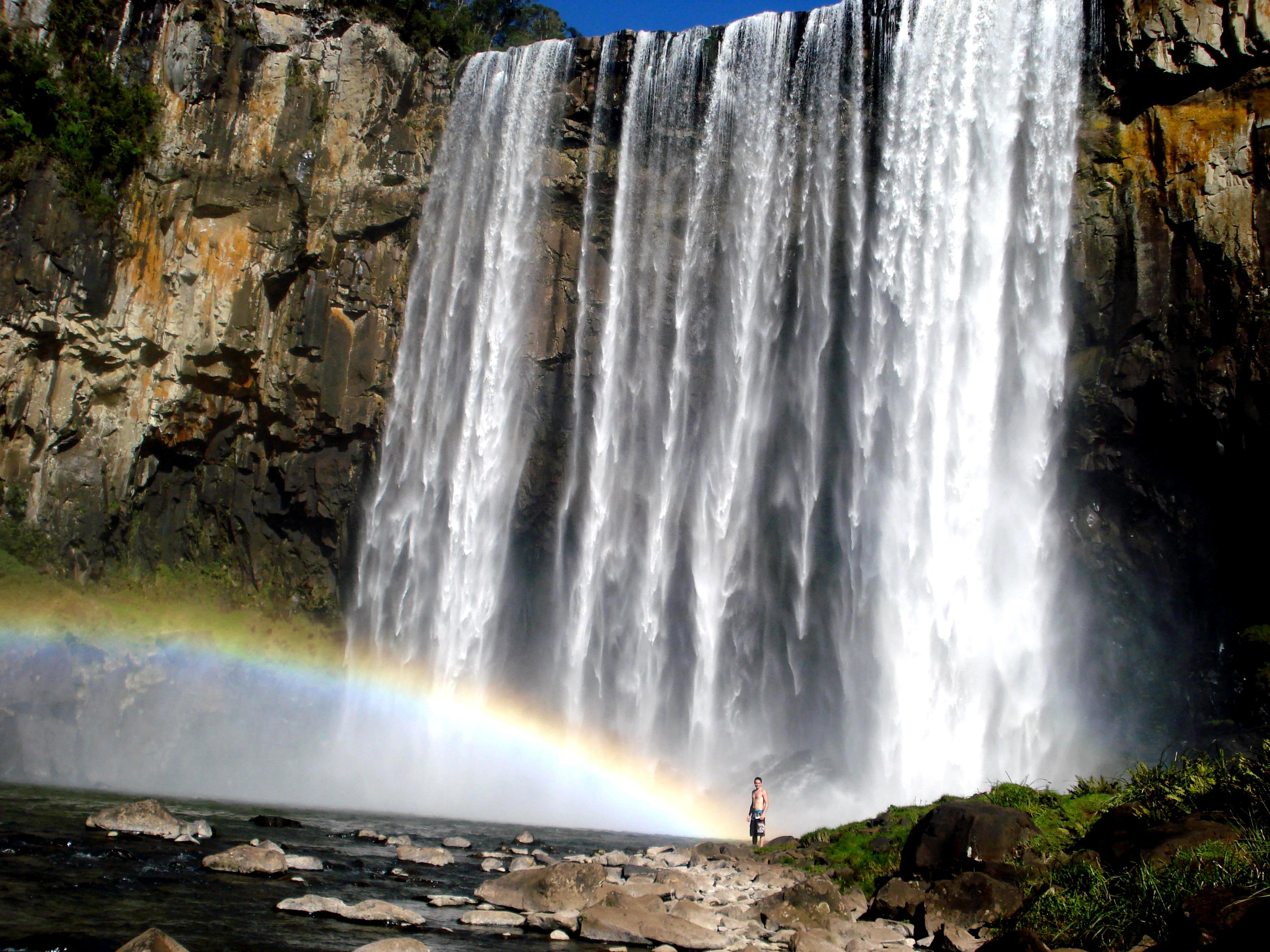
Panoramic view of Timbo River

The Timbó River is a river of Santa Catarina state in southeastern Brazil. It is part of the Paraná River basin and a tributary of the Iguazu River. It flows into the Iguazu near Irineópolis.

== See also ==
- List of rivers of Santa Catarina
