= Itajaí-Açu river =

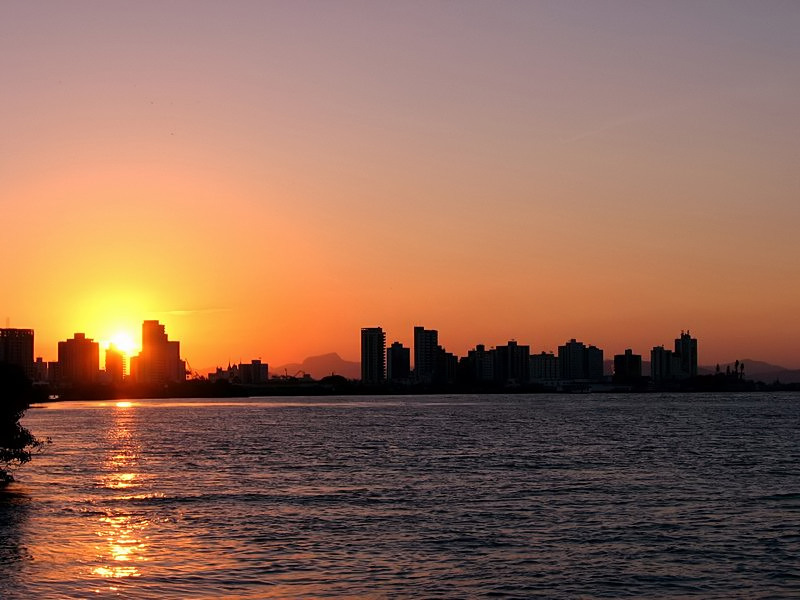
- Sunset on the Itajaí-Açu River at Itajaí

- Location within Brazil
- Native name: Rio Itajaí-Açu (Portuguese)

Location
- Country: Brazil

Physical characteristics
- Source
  - location: Santa Catarina state
- Mouth
  - location: Atlantic Ocean
  - coordinates: 26.912°S 48.642°W

The Itajaí-Açu River is a river in the state of Santa Catarina in southeastern Brazil. It flows into the Atlantic Ocean near the city Itajaí.

The river basin includes part of the 1,899 hectares (4,690 acres) Canela Preta Biological Reserve, a full protected area.

== See also ==
- List of rivers of Santa Catarina
