= List of tributaries of the Río de la Plata =

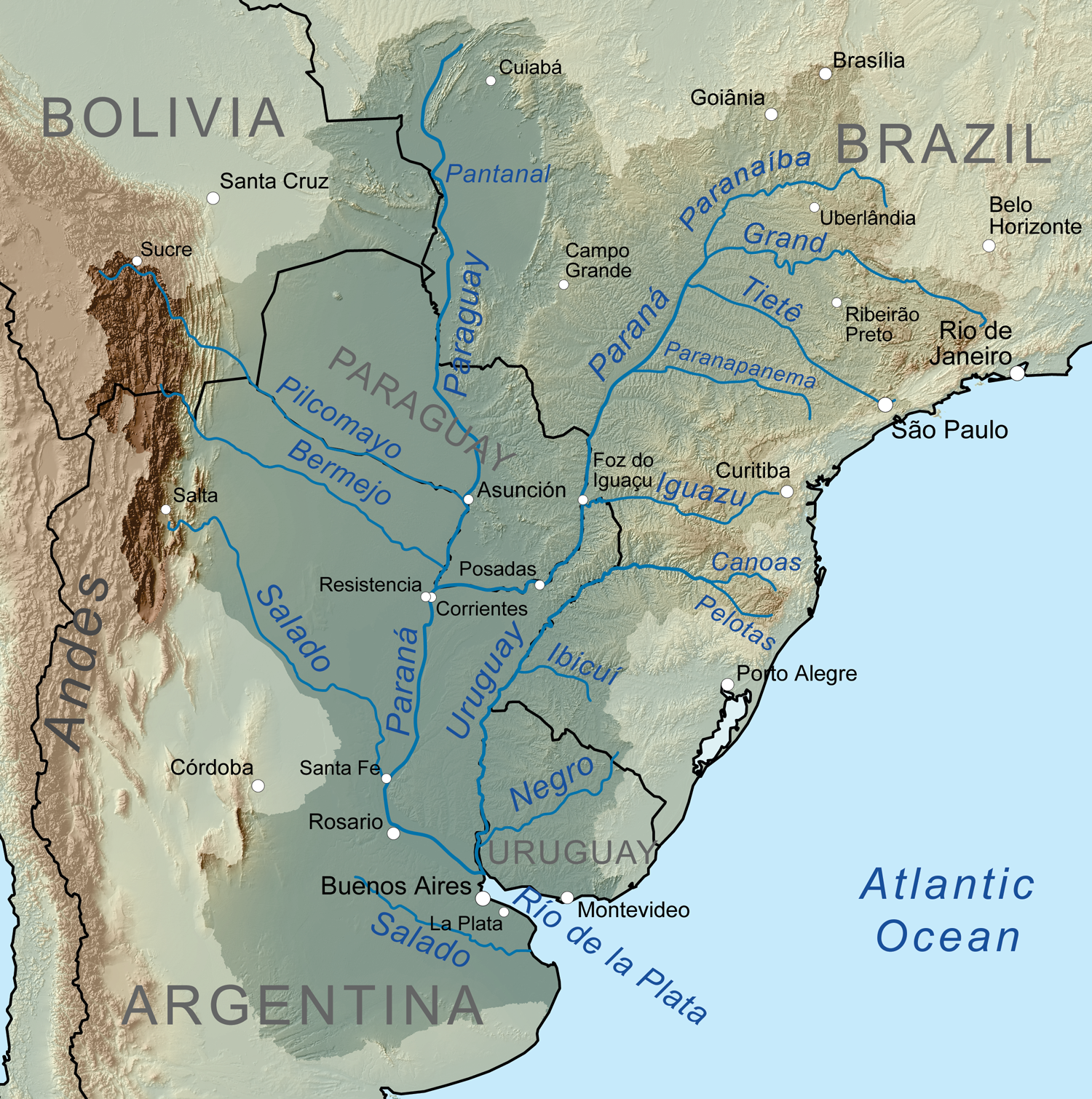
Map showing the Río de la Plata drainage basin and major tributaries

This is a list of tributaries of the Río de la Plata, or rivers of the La Plata Basin. Tributaries and sub-tributaries are hierarchically listed in order from the mouth of the Río de la Plata upriver. The terms "right" and "left" indicate on which side of the main stem river a tributary is located, from the perspective of looking downriver, following standard river bank terminology usage. Countries are identified in abbreviated form: AR for Argentina, UY for Uruguay, PY or PA for Paraguay, BR for Brazil, and BO for Bolivia. Major dams are also noted.

- Salado River: right; AR; 35°44′44″S 57°21′51″W (Samborombón Bay); Río Salado at GEOnet Names Server.
  - Rio Vallimanca: right; AR.
- Samborombón River: right; AR; 35°43′0″S 57°20′50″W (Samborombón Bay); GNS: Río Samborombón at GEOnet Names Server.
- Santa Lucía River: left; UR.
- Matanza River (Riachuelo): right; AR; 34°37′57″S 58°20′46″W; Río Matanza at GEOnet Names Server.
- Luján River: right; AR; 34°25′55″S 58°32′28″W; Río Luján at GEOnet Names Server.
  - Reconquista River: right; AR
- San Juan River (Uruguay): left; UR; 34°16′26″S 57°59′21″W; Río San Juan at GEOnet Names Server.

- Uruguay River: left; AR, UY, BR; 35°43′0″S 57°20′50″W; GNS: Uruguay River at GEOnet Names Server, Río Uruguay at GEOnet Names Server, Rio Uruguai at GEOnet Names Server.
  - San Salvador River (Uruguay): left; UY.
  - Río Negro (Uruguay): left; UY; 33°25′S 58°25′W; GNS: Rio Negro at GEOnet Names Server.
    - Yí River: left; UY; 33°6′50″S 57°6′46″W; Río Yi at GEOnet Names Server.
      - Porongos River: left; UY.
      - Chamangá River: left; UY.
  - Gualeguaychú River: right; AR; 33°4′45″S 58°25′0″W; Río Gualeguaychú at GEOnet Names Server.
  - Queguay Grande River: right; UY.
    - Queguay Chico River: right; UY.
  - Daymán River: right; UY; 31°30′16″S 58°1′56″W; Río Daymán at GEOnet Names Server.
  - Salto Grande Dam: AR, UY.
  - Arapey Grande River: right; UY
    - Arapey Chico River: right; UY.
  - Mocoretá River: right; AR.
  - Miriñay River: right; AR; 30°10′12″S 57°37′59″W; Miriñay Río at GEOnet Names Server.
  - Quaraí River (Spanish Río Cuareim, Portuguese Rio Quaraí): left; UY, BR (border); 30°11′5″S 57°36′18″W; Río Cuareim at GEOnet Names Server.
  - Ibicuí River: left; BR; 29°25′16″S 56°46′20″W; Rio Ibicuí at GEOnet Names Server.
    - Itu River: right; BR; 29°24′37″S 55°51′2″W; Rio Itu at GEOnet Names Server.
    - Santa Maria River (Rio Grande do Sul): left Ibicuí source; BR; 29°48′13″S 54°55′20″W; Rio Santa Maria at GEOnet Names Server.
    - Ibicuí-Mirim River: right Ibicuí source; BR; 29°48′14″S 54°55′16″W; Rio Ibicuí-Mirim at GEOnet Names Server.
  - Aguapey River: right; AR; 29°6′39″S 56°35′6″W; Río Aguapey at GEOnet Names Server.
  - Icamaquã River: left; BR; 28°34′2″S 56°0′13″W; Rio Icamaquã at GEOnet Names Server.
  - Ijuí River: left; BR; 27°58′3″S 55°20′1″W; Rio Ijuí at GEOnet Names Server.
  - Santa Rosa River (Rio Grande do Sul): left; BR; 27°33′28″S 54°39′57″W; Rio Santa Rosa at GEOnet Names Server.
  - Pepiri-Guazu River (Spanish Río Pepirí Guazú, Portuguese Rio Peperi Guaçu): right; AR, BR (border); 27°10′S 53°50′W; Río Pepirí Guazú at GEOnet Names Server, Rio Peperi Guaçu at GEOnet Names Server.
  - Guarita River: left; BR.
  - Das Antas River (Rio Grande do Sul): right; BR.
  - Da Várzea River (Rio Grande do Sul): left; BR; 27°12′48″S 53°19′33″W; Rio da Várzea at GEOnet Names Server.
  - Chapecó River: right; BR; 27°5′43″S 53°0′57″W; Rio Chapecó at GEOnet Names Server.
    - Chapecozinho River: left; BR.
  - Passo Fundo River: left; BR; 27°17′8″S 52°41′26″W; Rio Passo Fundo at GEOnet Names Server.
  - Irani River: right; BR; 27°14′23″S 52°32′38″W; Rio Irani at GEOnet Names Server.
  - Do Peixe River (Santa Catarina): right; BR.
  - Forquetinha River: left; BR.
  - Canoas River (Santa Catarina): right Uruguay source; BR; 27°36′21″S 51°27′20″W; Rio Canoas at GEOnet Names Server.
    - Campos Novos Dam: BR (Santa Catarina).
    - Caveiras River: left; BR.
    - Marombas River: right; BR (Santa Catarina); 27°25′18″S 50°45′16″W; Rio Marombas at GEOnet Names Server.
  - Pelotas River: left Uruguay source; BR; 27°36′31″S 51°27′22″W; Rio Pelotas at GEOnet Names Server.
    - Vacas Gordas River: BR
    - Pelotinhas River: BR
    - Lava-Tudo River: BR
      - São Mateus River (Santa Catarina): BR
      - Antoninha River: BR
      - Da Divisa River: BR
      - Sumidouro River: BR
    - Púlpito River: BR

- Paraná River: right; AR, PA, BR; 34°0′5″S 58°23′37″W; GNS: ??.
  - Arrecifes River: right; AR; 33°45′19″S 59°34′11″W; Río Arrecifes at GEOnet Names Server.
  - Gualeguay River: left; AR; 33°19′0″S 59°38′0″W; Río Gualeguay at GEOnet Names Server.
  - Nogoya River: left; AR; 32°55′S 59°59′W; Arroyo Nogoyá at GEOnet Names Server, Río Nogoyá at GEOnet Names Server.
  - Arroyo del Medio; right; AR.
  - Saladillo Stream (Arroyo Saladillo or Río Saladillo): right; AR; 32°59′54″S 60°36′42″W; Arroyo Saladillo at GEOnet Names Server, Río Saladillo at GEOnet Names Server.
  - Ludueña Stream: right; AR; 32°54′23″S 60°40′34″W; Arroyo Ludueña at GEOnet Names Server.
  - Carcarañá River: right; AR; 32°26′32″S 60°48′13″W; Río Carcarañá at GEOnet Names Server.
    - Tercero River (Calamuchita River): left Carcarañá source; AR; 32°54′54″S 62°19′29″W; Río Tercero at GEOnet Names Server.
    - Cuarto River (Saladillo River, Chocancharava River): right Carcarañá source; AR; 32°54′55″S 62°19′29″W; Río Cuarto at GEOnet Names Server.
  - Salado River (Argentina) (also Salado del Norte, Juramento River, Pasaje River, Calchaquí River): right; AR; 31°41′2″S 60°44′33″W; Río Salado at GEOnet Names Server, Río Pasaje at GEOnet Names Server, Río Juramento at GEOnet Names Server.
    - Horcones River (variant: Río Rosario): right; AR (Santiago Estero and Salta); 26°35′S 63°58′W; Río Horcones at GEOnet Names Server, Río Rosario at GEOnet Names Server.
      - Urueña River: right; AR (Santiago Estero and Salta); 26°14′S 64°30′W; Río Urueña at GEOnet Names Server.
    - Arenales River
    - Rosario River
    - Guasamayo River
  - Feliciano River: left; AR; 31°5′25″S 59°53′46″W; Arroyo Feliciano at GEOnet Names Server.
  - Guayquiraró River: left; AR; 30°24′46″S 59°34′47″W; Río Guayquiraró at GEOnet Names Server.
  - Corrientes River: left, AR; 30°0′38″S 59°33′21″W; Río Corrientes at GEOnet Names Server.
  - Paraná Miní River: right; AR; 29°5′9″S 59°24′21″W; Río Paraná Miní at GEOnet Names Server.
    - Tapenagá River: right; AR; 28°4′46″S 59°9′18″W; Río Tapenagá at GEOnet Names Server.
    - Palometa River: right; AR; 27°55′56″S 59°6′8″W; Riacho Palometa at GEOnet Names Server.
  - Santa Lucía River: left; AR; 29°4′43″S 59°14′9″W; Río Santa Lucía at GEOnet Names Server.
  - Negro River (Chaco): right; AR (Chaco); 27°28′8″S 58°53′48″W; Río Negro at GEOnet Names Server.
  - Guaycurú River: right; AR (Chaco).

  - Paraguay River: right; AR, PA, BR; 27°17′21″S 58°36′29″W; GNS: Río Paraguay at GEOnet Names Server.
    - Río de Oro: right; AR; 27°4′S 58°34′W; Río de Oro at GEOnet Names Server.
    - Bermejo River (Teuco River): right; AR, BO; 26°52′S 58°23′W; GNS: Río Bermejo at GEOnet Names Server.
      - Bermejito River: right (anabranch); AR; 25°39′S 60°11′W; GNS: Río Bermejito at GEOnet Names Server.
        - Dorado River
      - Teuquito River
      - Seco River
      - San Francisco River: right; AR (Salta, Jujuy); 23°18′15″S 64°4′45″W; Río San Francisco at GEOnet Names Server.
        - Grande River
        - Mojotoro River (Lavayén River)
      - Pescado River: right; AR; 22°59′48″S 64°20′12″W; Río Pescado at GEOnet Names Server.
        - Iruya River: left; AR; 22°20′12″S 64°5′52″W; Río Itaú at GEOnet Names Server.
      - Río Grande de Tarija: left; AR; 22°55′37″S 64°20′11″W; Río Grande de Tarija at GEOnet Names Server.
        - Itaú River: left; AR and BO; 22°20′12″S 64°5′52″W; Río Itaú at GEOnet Names Server.
      - Lipeo River: right; AR; 22°26′28″S 64°31′33″W; Río Lipeo at GEOnet Names Server.
    - Tebicuary River; left; PY; 26°36′16″S 58°11′34″W; Río Tebicuary at GEOnet Names Server.
    - Pilcomayo River: right; AR, BO: 25°21′S 57°40′W; Río Pilcomayo at GEOnet Names Server.
      - Pilaya River (Bolivia)
        - San Juan del Oro River (Bolivia)
          - Río Grande de San Juan
    - Confuso River: right, PA; 25°7′57″S 57°32′31″W; Río Confuso at GEOnet Names Server.
    - Salado River (Paraguay): left; PA; 25°6′26″S 57°28′38″W; Río Salado at GEOnet Names Server.
    - Piribebuy River: left; PY.
    - Manduvirá River: left; PY; 24°57′30″S 57°18′28″W; Río Salado at GEOnet Names Server.
    - Aguaray-Guazú River (Paraguay River): right; PY
    - Negro River (Paraguay): PY
    - Jejuí Guazú River: left; PA.
    - Monte Lindo River: PY
    - Ypané River: left; PY; 23°28′39″S 57°26′32″W; Río Ypané at GEOnet Names Server.
    - Aquidabán River: left; PY
    - Verde River (Paraguay): PY
    - Apa River: left, PA, BR (border); 22°5′26″S 57°59′24″W; Rio Apa at GEOnet Names Server.
      - Perdido River (Mato Grosso do Sul): right; BR (Mato Grosso do Sul).
      - Caracol River (Mato Grosso do Sul): right; BR (Mato Grosso do Sul).
    - Amanguijá River: left; BR (Mato Grosso do Sul).
    - Tarunã River: left; BR (Mato Grosso do Sul).
    - Tererê River: left; BR (Mato Grosso do Sul).
    - Branco River (Mato Grosso do Sul): left; BR (Mato Grosso do Sul).
    - Aquidabã River (Mato Grosso do Sul): left; BR (Mato Grosso do Sul).
    - Novo River (Paraguay River): right; BR (Mato Grosso do Sul).
    - Miranda River (Brazil): left; BR (Mato Grosso do Sul); 19°24′46″S 57°19′55″W; Rio Miranda at GEOnet Names Server.
      - Aquidauana River: right; BR (Mato Grosso do Sul).
      - Salobra River: left; BR (Mato Grosso do Sul).
    - Negro River (Mato Grosso do Sul): left; BR (Mato Grosso do Sul); 19°14′20″S 57°13′15″W; Rio Negro at GEOnet Names Server.
      - Taboco River: left; BR (Mato Grosso do Sul).
      - Inhumas River (Mato Grosso do Sul): right; BR (Mato Grosso do Sul).
    - Taquari-Mirim River (Mato Grosso do Sul): left; BR (Mato Grosso do Sul).
    - Cuiabá River: BR; 17°9′10″S 56°38′57″W; Rio Cuiabá at GEOnet Names Server.
    - Paraguazinho River: left; BR (MG, Pantanal)
    - Cassanje River: left; BR (Mato Grosso, Pantanal);
    - Jauru River (Mato Grosso): right; BR; 16°20′41″S 57°46′55″W; Rio Jauru at GEOnet Names Server.
      - Aguapeí River: right; BR (Mato Grosso); 15°52′23″S 58°23′55″W; Rio Aguapeí at GEOnet Names Server.
    - Cabaçal River: right; BR (Mato Grosso); 15°59′52″S 57°42′19″W; Rio Cabaçal at GEOnet Names Server.
    - Vermelho River (Mato Grosso): right; BR (MG).
      - Sepotuba River: left; BR (MG).

- (Paraná River above Paraguay confluence)
  - Yacyretá Dam: AR, PY.
  - Iguazu River (Portuguese Rio Iguaçu, Spanish Río Iguazú, also Rio Iguassu): left; BR, AR (partially border); 25°35′33″S 54°35′27″W; Rio Iguaçu at GEOnet Names Server, Río Iguazú at GEOnet Names Server
    - San Antonio River: left; BR, AR (border).
    - Chopim River: left; BR.
    - Salt Santiago Dam
    - Jordão River (Paraná): right; BR.
    - Iratim River: left; BR.
  - São Francisco River (Paraná): left; BR (Paraná).
  - Piquiri River: left; BR (Paraná); 24°1′37″S 54°5′37″W; Rio Piquiri at GEOnet Names Server.
    - Goio-Erê River: right; BR.
    - Cantú River: right; BR.
    - Do Cobre River: left; BR.
  - Ivaí River: left; BR (Paraná); 23°18′17″S 53°41′49″W; Rio Ivaí at GEOnet Names Server.
    - Ligeiro River: left; BR.
    - Corumbataí River (Paraná): left; BR.
  - Ivinhema River: right; BR (Mato Grosso do Sul).
  - Paranapanema River: left; BR (Paraná and São Paulo border); 22°39′30″S 53°5′23″W; Rio Paranapanema at GEOnet Names Server.
    - Rosana Dam
    - Taquaruçu Dam
    - Capivara Dam
    - Tibagi River: left; BR (Paraná); 22°47′55″S 51°0′18″W; Rio Tibagi at GEOnet Names Server.
      - Iapó River: right; BR (Paraná).
    - Das Cinzas River: left; BR (Paraná).
      - Laranjinha River: left; BR (Paraná).
    - Salto Grande Dam
    - Pardo River (Paranapanema River): right; BR (São Paulo); 22°54′43″S 49°57′57″W; Rio Pardo at GEOnet Names Server.
    - Xavantes Dam
    - Itararé River: left: BR (Paraná and São Paulo border).
    - Taquari-Guaçu River: left; BR (São Paulo).
    - Apiai-Guaçu River: left; BR (São Paulo).
    - Itapetininga River: right; BR (São Paulo); 23°36′1″S 48°26′33″W; Rio Itapetininga at GEOnet Names Server.
  - Sérgio Motta Dam
  - Pardo River (Mato Grosso do Sul): right; BR; 21°39′51″S 52°13′27″W; Rio Pardo at GEOnet Names Server.
    - Anhanduí River: right; BR.
  - Do Peixe River (Paraná River): left; BR (São Paulo).
  - Verde River (Mato Grosso do Sul): right; BR.
    - São Domingos River (Mato Grosso do Sul): left; BR.
  - Aguapeí River (São Paulo): right; BR.
  - Eng Souza Dias (Jupiá) Dam
  - Sucuriú River: right; BR (Mato Grosse do Sul); 20°42′43″S 51°39′36″W; Rio Sucuriú at GEOnet Names Server.
  - Tietê River: left; BR (São Paulo); 20°37′40″S 51°33′54″W; Rio Tietê at GEOnet Names Server.
    - Três Irmãos Dam
    - Nova Avanhandava Dam
    - Promissão Dam
    - Ibitinga Dam
    - Bariri Dam
    - Barra Bonita Dam
    - Piracicaba River: right; BR (São Paulo); 22°36′53″S 48°19′12″W; Rio Piracicaba at GEOnet Names Server.
    - Anhembi Dam
    - Laras Dam
    - Sorocaba River: left; BR; 22°58′56″S 47°48′24″W; Rio Sorocaba at GEOnet Names Server.
      - Ituparanga Dam
      - Sarapuí River (São Paulo): left; BR.
    - Capivari River (Tietê River): right; BR; 22°59′3″S 47°45′51″W; Rio Capivari at GEOnet Names Server.
    - Jundiaí River (upper Tietê River): right; BR; 23°12′41″S 47°17′34″W; Rio Jundiaí at GEOnet Names Server.
    - Pinheiros River: left; BR (São Paulo state and São Paulo city); 23°31′36″S 46°45′0″W; Rio Pinheiros at GEOnet Names Server.
      - Rio Grande (Pinheiros River): left; São Paulo City.
        - Guarapiranga (reservoir): São Paulo City.
      - Billings Reservoir: São Paulo City.
  - Ilha Solteira Dam
  - São José dos Dourados River: left; BR (São Paulo); 20°22′22″S 51°19′22″W; Rio São José dos Dourados at GEOnet Names Server.
  - Grande River: left Paraná source; BR (São Paulo and Minas Gerais border); 20°4′41″S 50°59′41″W; Rio Grande at GEOnet Names Server.
    - Água Vermelha Dam
    - Turvo River (Grande River): left; BR (São Paulo); 19°56′59″S 49°53′54″W; Rio Turvo at GEOnet Names Server.
    - Marimbondo Dam
    - Pardo River (São Paulo): left; BR; 20°10′12″S 48°38′40″W; Rio Pardo at GEOnet Names Server.
      - Moji-Guaçu River: left; BR (São Paulo); 20°53′16″S 48°10′39″W; Rio Moji-Guaçu at GEOnet Names Server.
      - Moji-Mirim River: left?; BR.
    - Porto Colõmbia Dam
    - Volta Grande Dam
    - Igarapava Dam
    - Jaguará Dam
    - Luiz Barreto (Estreito) Dam
    - Furnas Dam
    - Camargos Dam
  - Paranaíba River: right Paraná source; BR (Minas Gerais and Goiás, border in part); 20°4′43″S 51°0′22″W; Rio Iguaçu at GEOnet Names Server, Rio Paranaíba at GEOnet Names Server.
    - Aporé River: right; BR (Goiás and Mato Grosse do Sul border); 19°27′29″S 50°56′26″W; Rio Aporé at GEOnet Names Server.
    - Corrente River (Paranaíba River): right; BR (Goiás); 19°18′42″S 50°50′19″W; Rio Corrente at GEOnet Names Server.
    - Claro River (Paranaíba River): right; BR (Goiás); 19°7′56″S 50°38′40″W; Rio Claro at GEOnet Names Server.
      - Doce River (Goiás): left; BR; 18°21′24″S 51°14′17″W; Rio Doce at GEOnet Names Server.
    - São Simão Dam
    - Tijuco River: left; BR (Minas Gerais); 18°40′49″S 50°4′8″W; Rio Tijuco at GEOnet Names Server.
      - Da Prata River (Tijuco River): left; BR.
    - Dos Bois River (Paranaíba River): right; BR (Goiás).
      - Rio Verdão: right; BR.
    - Meia Ponte River: right; BR (Goiás); 18°32′39″S 49°35′48″W; Rio Meia Ponte at GEOnet Names Server.
    - Cachoeira Dourada Dam
    - Itumbiara Dam
    - Araguari River (Minas Gerais) (also Das Velhas River): left; BR; 18°20′42″S 48°38′5″W; Rio Araguari at GEOnet Names Server
      - Uberabinha River:
      - Quebra-Anzol River:
    - Emborcação Dam
    - São Marcos River: right; BR; 18°14′44″S 47°36′44″W; Rio São Marcos at GEOnet Names Server.
    - Verde River (upper Paranaíba River): right; BR; 23°36′1″S 48°26′33″W; Rio Verde at GEOnet Names Server.
