= Itapeva, São Paulo =

Itapeva
- Municipality
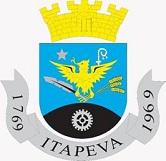
- Flag Coat of arms

- Location in São Paulo state

- Location in Brazil
- Coordinates: 23°58′56″S 48°52′32″W
- Country: Brazil
- Region: Southeast
- State: São Paulo

Area
  - Total: 1,826.26 km^{2} (705.12 sq mi)

Population (2022)
  - Total: 89.728
  - Density: 49.13/km^{2} (127.2/sq mi)
- Time zone: UTC-03:00 (BRT)
  - Summer (DST): UTC-02:00 (BRST)

Itapeva is a city in the state of São Paulo, Brazil. The population is 94,804 (2020 est.) in an area of 1826.26 km^{2}.

== History ==
The city was founded as a village in the beginning of the 18th century. In 1769 the municipality was created, by separating it from Sorocaba. Named Itapeva da Faxina until 1910 and Faxina until 1938. In Tupi language, Itapeva means “flat stone”.

Founder: Antônio Furquim Pedroso.

In Itapeva is located the Wall of the Slaves, which is a tourist point, in addition to the Vila Isabel Station, the Pilão D’Agua and the Dr. Pinheiro Promenade.

== Geography ==
Itapeva is located at an elevation of 684 meters.

=== HDI ===
HDI (HDI-M): 0,745 (Fonte: IPEADATA)

=== Hydrography ===
- Apiaí-Guaçu River
- Taquari River
- Pirituba River
- Taquari-Mirim River
- Taquari-Guaçu River

=== Highways ===
- SP-249
- SP-258 Francisco Alves Negrão Highway

=== Districts ===
Itapeva has three districts

- Guarizinho
- Alto da Brancal
- Areia Branca

=== Climate ===
The coldest month is June (mean temperature 15.1 °C, 59°F), and the hottest is January (mean 22.7 °C, 73 °F). Rainfall averages 1254 mm.

Climate data for Itapeva, elevation 743 m (2,438 ft), (1995–2017 normals, extremes 1969–1993, 2006–present)
Month	Jan	Feb	Mar	Apr	May	Jun	Jul	Aug	Sep	Oct	Nov	Dec	Year
Record high °C (°F)	36.5 (97.7)	36.4 (97.5)	35.1 (95.2)	33.1 (91.6)	31.3 (88.3)	30.3 (86.5)	30.3 (86.5)	32.2 (90.0)	37.1 (98.8)	37.5 (99.5)	37.0 (98.6)	34.8 (94.6)	37.5 (99.5)
Mean daily maximum °C (°F)	28.9 (84.0)	29.3 (84.7)	29.5 (85.1)	27.6 (81.7)	24.0 (75.2)	22.7 (72.9)	22.8 (73.0)	25.4 (77.7)	25.6 (78.1)	27.1 (80.8)	27.9 (82.2)	28.7 (83.7)	26.6 (79.9)
Daily mean °C (°F)	24.0 (75.2)	24.1 (75.4)	24.0 (75.2)	22.0 (71.6)	18.4 (65.1)	17.2 (63.0)	16.9 (62.4)	18.8 (65.8)	19.6 (67.3)	21.4 (70.5)	22.2 (72.0)	23.3 (73.9)	21.0 (69.8)
Mean daily minimum °C (°F)	19.0 (66.2)	18.9 (66.0)	18.5 (65.3)	16.4 (61.5)	12.9 (55.2)	11.7 (53.1)	11.0 (51.8)	12.3 (54.1)	13.6 (56.5)	15.8 (60.4)	16.5 (61.7)	17.9 (64.2)	15.4 (59.7)
Record low °C (°F)	11.2 (52.2)	12.0 (53.6)	7.8 (46.0)	2.4 (36.3)	2.2 (36.0)	−2.1 (28.2)	−1.7 (28.9)	−1.1 (30.0)	2.1 (35.8)	6.0 (42.8)	6.2 (43.2)	9.4 (48.9)	−2.1 (28.2)
Average precipitation mm (inches)	263.1 (10.36)	191.0 (7.52)	141.7 (5.58)	76.3 (3.00)	74.4 (2.93)	68.4 (2.69)	75.5 (2.97)	54.7 (2.15)	120.4 (4.74)	145.0 (5.71)	114.6 (4.51)	182.0 (7.17)	1,507.1 (59.33)
Average relative humidity (%)	73	73	74	74	75	75	72	70	74	74	73	79	74
Mean monthly sunshine hours	198.0	179.7	191.3	183.0	185.4	174.4	205.8	196.2	163.5	200.2	186.6	177.8	2,241.9
Source 1: Centro Integrado de Informações Agrometeorológicas
Source 2: INMET (humidity and sun 1961–1990)

== Demography ==
Historical population (municipality)
Year	Population	%±
1920	22,025
1940	25,455	15.6%
1950	23,546	−7.5%
1960	33,860	43.8%
1970	49,122	45.1%
1980	65,546	33.4%
1991	81,858	24.9%
2000	82,866	1.2%
2010	87,753	5.9%
2022	89,728	2.3%

== Governance ==
- Mayor: falcão got de Itapeva sp( PSDB ) 2021-2025

== Higher education ==
- Faculdade Metodista do Sul Paulista
- FAIT
- UNESP - São Paulo State University
- UNIGRAN NET
- FATEC Internacional
- FACINTER

== Media ==
In telecommunications, the city was served by Companhia Telefônica Brasileira until 1973, when it began to be served by Telecomunicações de São Paulo. In July 1998, this company was acquired by Telefónica, which adopted the Vivo brand in 2012.

The company is currently an operator of cell phones, fixed lines, internet (fiber optics/4G) and television (satellite and cable).

== See also ==
- List of municipalities in São Paulo
