= Itatín =

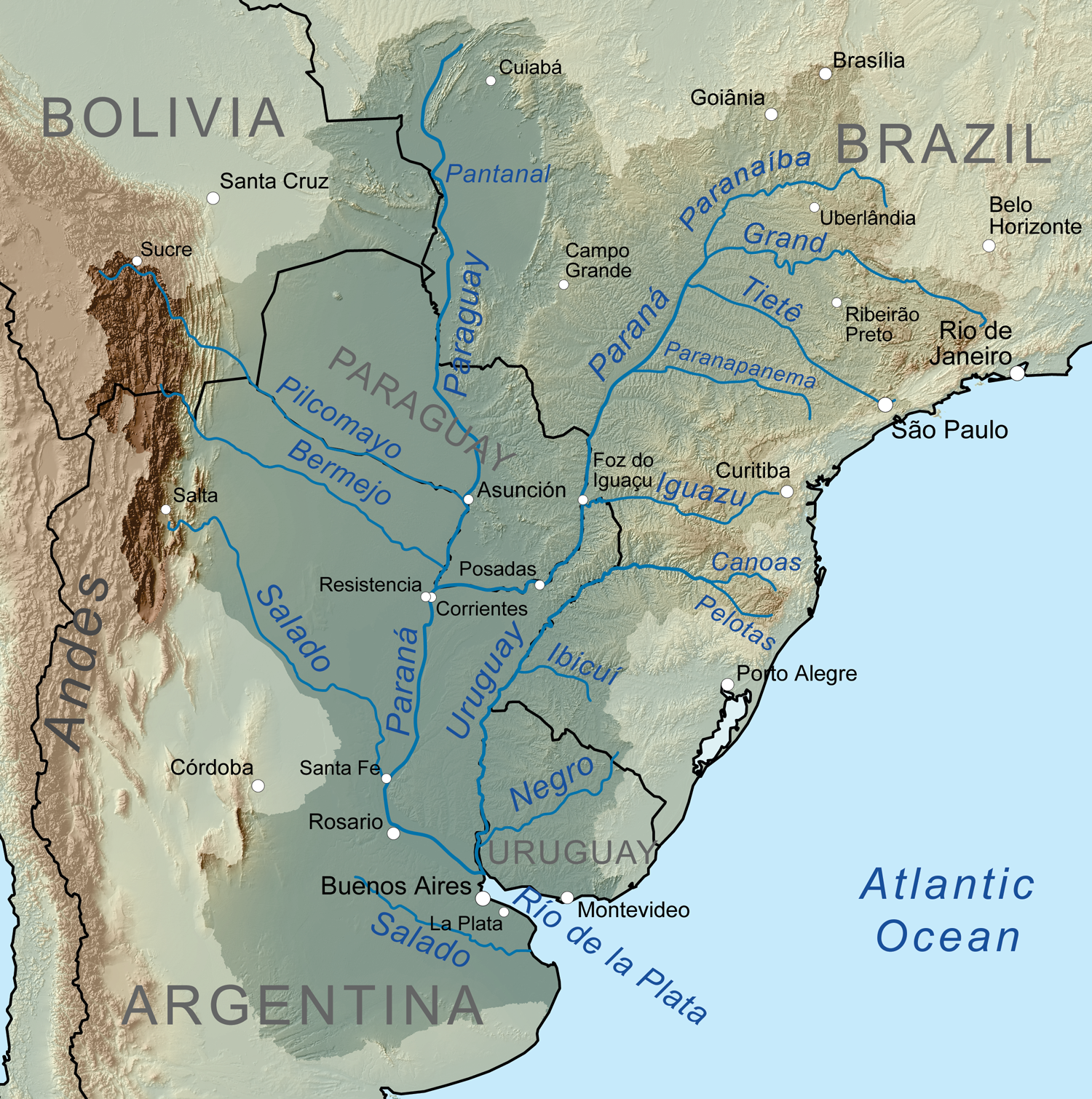
Itatín is in Brazil, east of the Paraguay River and south of the Pantanal.

Itatín (Portuguese: Itatim) was a 17th century region, corresponding to the western half of the 21st century Brazilian state of Mato Grosso do Sul. The Indigenous people (Indians or Indios) inhabiting the region gave their name to Itatín. The Itatínes were related to the Guaraní who lived to their south in Paraguay. In 1631, the Jesuit Order of the Roman Catholic church began founding missions in Itatín but the missions failed in 1648 because of slave raids by the Bandeirantes of Brazil and revolts against the Jesuits. Considered part of colonial Paraguay, Itatín was ceded to Brazil in 1750 by the Treaty of Madrid. The name has fallen out of use.

== Geography ==
The Itatín region is roughly 300 km (190 miles) from north to south and the same distance from east to west. It is bordered by the Paraguay River on the west, the Maracaju Mountains on the east, the vast Pantanal wetland to the north, and the Apa River on the south. The climate is tropical and the vegetation ranges from tropical rain forest to savannah grassland.

The Itatín was important for the existence of a ford across the Paraguay River about 55 km (34 miles) south of the present day city of Corumbá. Called the Jesuit's Ford (Paso de las Jesuitas) the river dropped to a depth of only 2 m (6.6 ft) during the dry season months of November to January. Use of this ford by the Itatínes and other Indians pre-dated the Jesuits. The ford marked the beginning of the easiest route across the Gran Chaco region to Chiquitos in Bolivia and to the Andes, the homeland of the Inca Empire in Peru and Bolivia. The ford was first used by Europeans in 1524 when Aleixo Garcia joined a party of Guaraní journeying westwards to pillage the wealth of the Incas. Jesuits missions in Itatín near the ford had the objectives of facilitating access to their missions in Peru and Bolivia and enabling them to evangelize the Chiquitos people.

== Jesuit missions ==
Early Spanish explorations of the Itatín were prompted by an objective of finding a route to Peru. In 1609 the Jesuits began establishing missions in the Guayrá region of Brazil, 800 km (500 miles) southeast of Itatín. Slave raids by Bandeirantes from Brazil made those missions untenable. Looking for alternatives the Jesuits moved the Guayrá missions southwest and explored new mission fields. In 1631, a Jesuit priest named Jacobo Ransonnier journeyed to Itatín where a small Spanish settlement existed at Santiago de Jerez (near present-day Aquidauana). The Itatínes were suspicious; they had been raided previously by Bandeirantes, apparently with the assistance of Portuguese priests, or laymen impersonating priests. Nevertheless, Ransonnier with other Jesuits succeeded in establishing missions along the Miranda River, by gaining the confidence of a local cacique, Nianduabusuvius (Nanduabuçu). Bandeirantes raids continued, however, often with the assistance of Spanish colonists who also desired Indian slave labor. Nainduabusuvius himself was captured in 1642 along with 1,000 Christianized Indians who were taken away to work as slaves in coastal Brazil.

In 1644, the Itatínes revolted and threatened and abused several Jesuits. The Jesuits lured Nianduabusuvius' son and two nephews into a trap and executed them, but the Jesuits could not recoup their position in Itatín. In 1648, the prominent Bandeirante Antonio Raposo Tavares completed the destruction of the Jesuit missions and the expulsion of the Spanish from Itatín.

Moreover, the Jesuit objective of opening a route from Itatín to Peru failed. Two Jesuits crossed the Paraguay River in 1645 and headed west across the Gran Chaco. They were captured and executed by the Guaycurus, probably the people later known as the Mbayá who were becoming nomadic horsemen. Some Itatínes especially the anti-Jesuit shamans had fled the missions and assisted the Guaycurus. Many of the Itatínes and other Guaranì were migrating west during this period, a pull factor being the wealth of the former Inca Empire and a push factor being to escape the Bandeirantes and the Spanish colonists. In 1661, in a counter movement, some Mbayá migrated east of the Paraguay River and displaced many of the Itatin. For the next 100 years the expanding Mbayá and their subjects, the Guaná, plus the surviving Itatin, controlled Itatín.

Access to the Itatín region was also hindered during the 18th century by the Payagua, a riverine people related to the Mbayá who lived along the Paraguay River. The Payagua fought and won many battles with prospectors attempting to reach gold mines north of Itatín via the Paraguay River.

The 21st century survivors of the Itatín people are likely the Guarayos in Bolivia and the Guarani-Kaiowá and Pai Tavytera of Brazil and Paraguay.

== Bibliography ==
- Combes, Isabel (2015). "Itatines y Guarayos: (Oriente boliviano, siglos XVI-XVIII)". JSTOR. Anthropos.
- Gott, Richard (1993). Land without Evil. London: Verso. ISBN 0860913988.
- Hemming, John (1978). Red Gold. Cambridge, MA: Harvard University Press. ISBN 0674751078.
- Martinez, Cecilia Gabriela (2017). "Cavaleiros versus Flecheros". Americania Revista Estudios Latinoamericanos. Conicet.
- "Francisco Jose Sanchez Labrador". Real Academia de la Historia.
