= Ofayé =

Indigenous people of Central Brazil

Total population
- 60 (2010)

Regions with significant populations
- Mato Grosso do Sul, Brazil

Languages
- Ofayé language, Kaiwá, Portuguese

Religion
- Christianity

The Ofayé (also spelled as Opaié or Ofayé) are an Indigenous people of Central Brazil. They live along the Paraná River, near the mouth of the Sucuriú River into the headwaters of the Ivinhema and Vacaria Rivers.

Their traditional lands were overtaken by cattle ranchers. Most Ofayé live in a reservation located in the municipality of Brasilândia in the state of Mato Grosso do Sul.

== Language ==
The Ofaye language, a Macro-Jê language, is severely endangered, and only two people were recorded speaking it in 2005.
