= List of rivers of Mato Grosso do Sul =

List of rivers in Mato Grosso do Sul (Brazilian State).

The list is arranged by drainage basin, with respective tributaries indented under each larger stream's name and ordered from downstream to upstream. All rivers in Mato Grosso do Sul drain to the Atlantic Ocean via the Paraná River.

== By Drainage Basin ==
- Paraná River
  - Paraguay River
    - Apa River
      - Perdido River
      - Caracol River
      - Piripucu River
    - Amanguijá River
    - Tarunã River
    - Tererê River
    - Branco River
    - Aquidabã River
    - Nabileque River
    - Novo River
    - Miranda River
      - Aquidauana River
        - Taquaraçu River
        - Cachoeirão River
          - Varadouro River
      - Salobra River
      - Nioaque River
    - Abobral River
    - Negro River
      - Capivari River
      - Vazante Grande
      - Taboco River
      - Inhumas River
      - Negrinho River
    - Taquari River
      - Taquari-Mirim River
      - Coxim River
        - Jauru River
        - Novo River
      - Do Peixe River
    - Cuiabá River (São Lourenço River)
      - Piqueri River
        - Correntes River
    - Curiche Grande River (Corixa Grande River)
  - Iguatemi River
    - Jagui River
    - Pirajuí River
  - Itaquiraí River
  - Maracaí River
  - Amambaí River
  - Laranjaí River
  - Ivinhema River
    - Guareí River
    - Vacaria River
    - Brilhante River
      - Dourados River
        - São João River
      - Santa Maria River
  - Samambaia River
  - Combate River
  - Quitéro River
  - Pardo River
    - Anhanduí River
      - Anhanduìzinho River
        - Ribeirão Lontra
  - Taquaruçu River
  - Verde River
    - São Domingos River
  - Sucuriú River
    - Brioso River
    - Indaiá Grande River
  - Pântano River
  - Quitéria River
  - Paranaíba River
    - Santana River
    - Barreiros River
    - Aporé River

== Alphabetically ==
- Abobral River
- Amambaí River
- Amanguijá River
- Anhanduí River
- Anhanduìzinho River
- Apa River
- Aporé River
- Aquidabã River
- Aquidauana River
- Barreiros River
- Branco River
- Brilhante River
- Brioso River
- Cachoeirão River
- Capivari River
- Caracol River
- Combate River
- Correntes River
- Coxim River
- Cuiabá River (São Lourenço River)
- Curiche Grande River (Corixa Grande River)
- Dourados River
- Guareí River
- Iguatemi River
- Indaiá Grande River
- Inhumas River
- Itaquiraí River
- Ivinhema River
- Jagui River
- Jauru River
- Laranjaí River
- Ribeirão Lontra
- Maracaí River
- Miranda River
- Nabileque River
- Negrinho River
- Negro River
- Nioaque River
- Novo River
- Novo River
- Pântano River
- Paraguay River
- Paraná River
- Paranaíba River
- Pardo River
- Do Peixe River
- Perdido River
- Piqueri River
- Pirajuí River
- Piripucu River
- Quitéria River
- Quitéro River
- Salobra River
- Samambaia River
- Santa Maria River
- Santana River
- São Domingos River
- São João River
- Sucuriú River
- Taboco River
- Taquaraçu River
- Taquari River
- Taquari-Mirim River
- Taquaruçu River
- Tarunã River
- Tererê River
- Vacaria River
- Varadouro River
- Vazante Grande
- Verde River
