= Antônio Pedroso de Barros =

Settler in Portuguese Brazil (died 1652)

Antônio Pedroso de Barros (died 1652) was a Brazilian bandeirante. He was the brother of bandeirante Pedro Vaz de Barros.

In 1650, many farms operated in the region known as Caioçara. The bandeirantes, going around Cangica hill reached the highland where the Campo Largo station building on the Bragantina Railway was built. Nearby was the farm of Antônio Pedroso de Barros. From this property the movements leading to the exploration of the region began.

Atibaia dates back to 1665. In 1653, in the inventory of Antônio Pedroso de Barros, the boundaries of the region called Caioçara appear, whose lands today belong partly to the municipality of Jarinu and partly to Atibaia.

The lands located before Juqueri (today Caieiras, Francisco Morato, Franco da Rocha and Mairiporã) included properties of bandeirantes such as Antônio Pedroso de Alvarenga, Brás Cardoso, Paulo Pereira, Pedro Fernandes, Mateus Luís Grou, Francisco Rodrigues Velho and his brothers and other sertanistas.

The flags encompassed entire families. The Mato Grosso flags were among the ones that fought the hardest. The objective was distant and the indigenous tribes were fierce and fearless. Through the rivers Tietê, Paraná, Pardo, Coxim and Taquari, 520 leagues had to be covered. The Indians were the Paiaguás and the Guaicurus, the first were lords of the rivers ("fish Indians") and the second were the horse Indians. The "paiaguás were the walls closing the mines of Cuiabá" and "terrible bugs, the more they killed, the more they wanted to kill".

== Personal life ==
Silva Leme tells about his family in Genealogia Paulistana. As stated in the inventory in his will, he died in 1652. The will was written by brother-in-law Francisco Dias Velho, after Perdoros's death. In it he declared that he was the son of Luzia Leme, that he was the brother of captains Fernão Pais de Barros and Pedro Vaz de Barros, and that he was the son-in-law of Inês Monteiro de Alvarenga.

In 1639 in São Paulo, he married Maria Pires de Medeiros, daughter of captain Salvador Pires de Medeiros and Inês Monteiro de Alvarenga, nicknamed "the matron". He left four legitimate children and four children with other women:

=== Legitimate children ===
- Pedro Vaz de Barros – born 10 April 1644 in São Paulo
- Antônio Pedroso de Barros.
- Inês Pedroso de Barros.
- Luzia Leme de Barros.

=== Other children ===
- Sebastiana, daughter of little Maria.
- Paulo, son of little Mary.
- Pascoal, son of the Indian woman Vitorina.
- Ventura, son of the Indian woman Iria.

He died in 1652. He was boosted by the number of 600 Indians he had on his farms.

== March to the West ==
His life is narrated in March to the West, a book by Cassiano Ricardo, where the author states: "Other pioneers heading west and northwest were the Pedroso (Pedroso Xavier and Pedroso de Barros). Antônio Pedroso de Barros and Luís Pedroso de Barros, two brothers, penetrated the west of Mato Grosso by river, the first carrying a flag with 500 Indians and the second 1,200."
