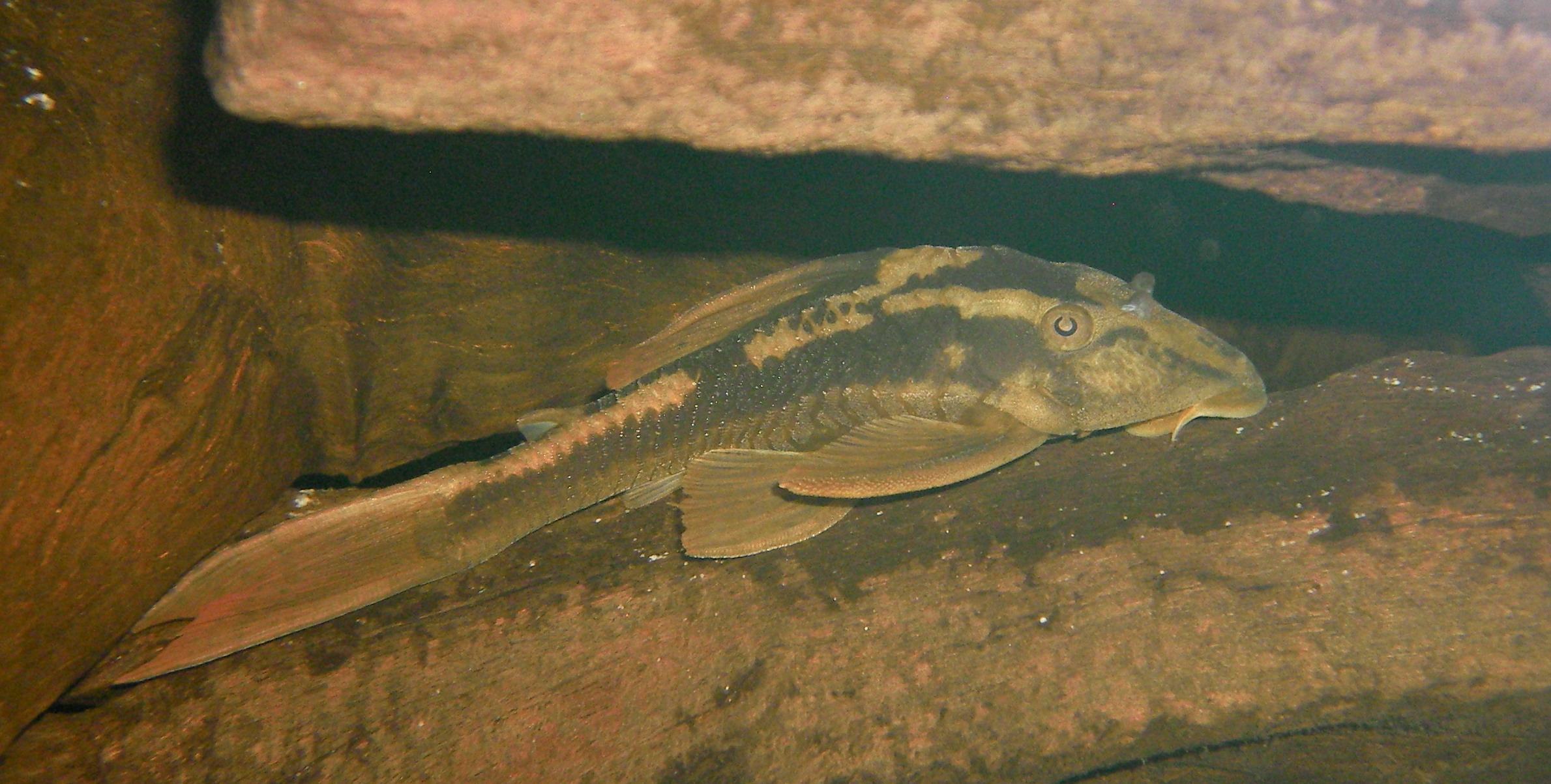

Scientific classification
- Kingdom: Animalia
- Phylum: Chordata
- Class: Actinopterygii
- Division: Teleostei
- Order: Siluriformes
- Family: Loricariidae
- Genus: Hypostomus
- Species: H. basilisko

Binomial name
- Hypostomus basilisko Tencatt, Zawadzki & Froehlich, 2014

= Hypostomus basilisko =

South American catfish species

Hypostomus basilisko, the basilisk pleco, is a species of freshwater ray-finned fish belonging to the family Loricariidae, the suckermouth armored catfishes, and the subfamily Hypostominae, the suckermouth catfishes. Tihi catfish is endemic to the Salobra River basin, which is part of the Paraguay River basin in the state of Mato Grosso do Sul in Brazil.

H. basilisko is typically found in areas with clear water and a variety of substrates. Larger individuals of the species are found lying on sand and leaf litter during the day while foraging in rocky areas at night, although feeding during the day has been occasionally observed. Smaller individuals forage during both day and night in shallower areas. The species primarily grazes on periphyton that grows on rocks and submerged wood.

H. basilisko reaches a standard length of 19.8 cm (7.8 in). It appears in the aquarium trade, where it is typically known as the basilisk pleco, a name derived from its specific epithet, which references the mythical basilisk. It was described in 2014 alongside its congener Hypostomus khimaera, which was also given a name alluding to a mythical creature, in this case the chimera.
