= Ofayé language =

Language within the Macro-Jê stock

Ofayé
- Opaye
- Ofayé
- Pronunciation: [əfajɛ]
- Native to: Brazil
- Region: Mato Grosso do Sul
- Ethnicity: 61 Ofayé people (2012)
- Native speakers: 3 (2025)
- Revival: effort underway
- Language family: Macro-Jê: Ofayé
- Dialects: Guachi (Vaccaria)

Language codes
- ISO 639-3: opy
- Glottolog: ofay1240
- ELP: Ofayé
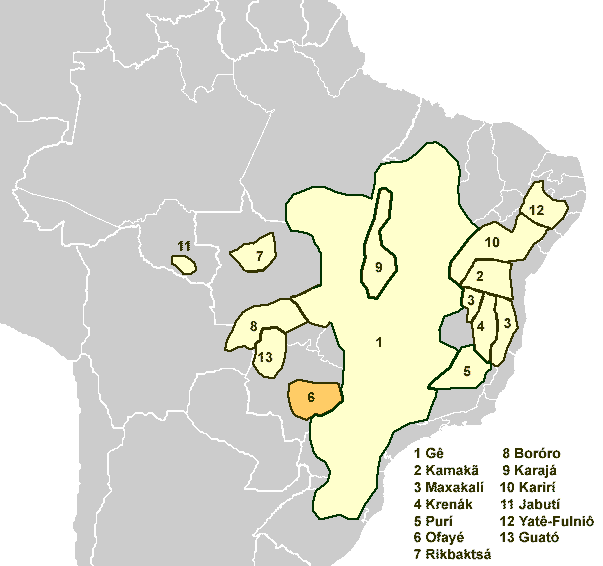
- Map of Ofayé among the Macro-Jê languages

- Ofayé is classified as Critically Endangered by the UNESCO Atlas of the World's Languages in Danger.

The Ofayé or Opaye language, also Ofaié-Xavante, Opaié-Shavante, is a Macro-Jê language spoken in Mato Grosso do Sul, Brazil, forming an independent branch of the language family. It is spoken by only three of the Ofayé people, though language revitalization efforts are underway.

== Documentation ==
Grammatical descriptions have been made by the Pankararú linguist Maria das Dores de Oliveira (Pankararu), as well as by Sarah C. Gudschinsky and Jennifer E. da Silva, from the Universidade Federal do Mato Grosso do Sul.

== Geographical distribution ==
It was spoken on the Ivinhema River, Pardo River, and Nhandú River in Mato Grosso do Sul. Guachi, spoken on the Vacaria River in Mato Grosso do Sul, is a dialect.

== Language contact ==
Jolkesky (2016) notes that there are lexical similarities with the Macro-Mataguayo-Guaykuru languages due to contact.

== Phonology ==
The consonantal inventory of Ofayé is as follows.

Consonants
		Labial	Alveolar	Postalveolar/ palatal	Velar	Labio-velar	Glottal
Nasal			n				
Stop	voiceless		t	tʃ	k	kʷ	ʔ
Stop	voiced		d	dʒ	g		
Fricative		ɸ		ʃ			h
Oral sonorant			ɾ	j		w	

The vowel inventory of Ofayé is as follows.

Vowels
	Front	Central	Back
Close	i ĩ		
Close-mid	e ẽ	ə	o õ
Open-mid	ɛ		
Open		a ã	
