= Kukurá language =

Spurious language invented in 1901

Kukurá
- Created by: Guzmán
- Date: 1901
- Setting and usage: Rio Verde, Mato Grosso do Sul, Brazil
- Ethnicity: Chavante
- Purpose: Constructed language: Fraud; Kukurá
- Sources: Guaraní (partially)

Language codes
- ISO 639-3: None (mis)
- Glottolog: kuku1286 (retired)

Kukurá (Cucurá, Kokura) is a spurious language, supposedly spoken in the state of Mato Grosso do Sul in Brazil, but fabricated by an interpreter in 1901 and subsequently erroneously presented as a distinct language. The language was first reported to exist in 1931 in a paper published by the Czech linguist Čestmír Loukotka; its existence was debunked a year later by the German-Brazilian anthropologist Curt Nimuendajú. Nevertheless, the language continued to appear in classifications until 2007.

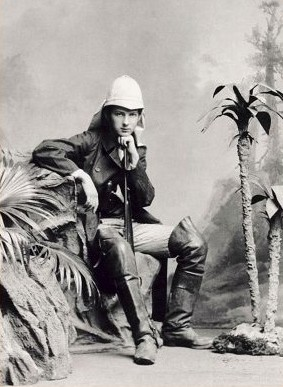
Alberto Vojtěch Frič

== History ==
When the Czech explorer Alberto Vojtěch Frič visited the Rio Verde in Brazil in 1901, he took with him a Kainguá man named Guzmán, who said he spoke the language of the local Chavante people, who were reported to have resided along the Rio Verde. A word list was subsequently published for the so-called Kukurá language, thought to be an isolate, in 1931, by Loukotka. He also compared it with vocabulary from the Ofayé, Otí, and a number of Tupi–Guarani languages. Due to the high incidence of words of Tupi-Guarani origin, he believed that they were loaned from the nearby Kaiwá language, a member of the Tupi-Guarani language family.

In 1932, Nimuendajú, who had visited the Rio Verde in 1909 and 1913, showed that Guzmán's wordlist consisted half of made-up words and half of mispronounced Guaraní, and that a language distinct from those which were actually spoken there could not have possibly existed. There was no resemblance to the Ofayé language that was actually spoken in the region, excepting the "Kukurá" word kaulalo 'black' with Ofayé kaõrá 'id.'. He thus concluded that the vocabulary had been fabricated by Guzmán. Guzmán had also falsified other vocabularies for which he was the informant.

Despite the debunking of the language's existence, it was still reported by Loukotka and the French linguist Paul Rivet's 1952 classification, grouping "Kukurá" as one of their 109 independent families, Antonio Tovar's 1961 classification, Loukotka's subsequent (1968) classification, in which he classified "Kukurá" as a language isolate, one of his 117 language isolates and families, Joseph Greenberg's (1987) Language in the Americas, which classified "Kukurá" as a "Macro-Carib" language, along with the real Andoque, Boran, Witotoan, Peba–Yaguan, and Cariban languages, in the "Ge-Pano-Carib" subgroup of his univerally rejected Amerind language family, and in American linguist Terrence Kaufman's (1994, 2007) classifications of South American languages, in which he also presented "Kukurá" as a language isolate.

== Vocabulary ==
The original 31-word vocabulary published by Loukotka (1931) is presented below.

| gloss | Kukura |
|---|---|
| to attach | auguka |
| chief | maravisá |
| cotton | mandadiu |
| finger | tikua |
| pain | timarasahia |
| enemy | kuarema |
| sparrowhawk | zumbi |
| face | tiravua |
| woman | monše |
| ant | tain |
| boy | uhdinambú |
| people, we | kukura |
| hammock, bed | holto |
| man | tiemé |
| tongue | kasti |
| long | lar |
| moon | malahan |
| house | aul |
| honey | lipeta |
| mosquito | inape |
| nose | šapingua |
| black | kaulalo |
| to speak | imahgeta |
| stone | tatahü |
| red | tipoil |
| tapir | murari |
| toucan | tukan |
| to kill | adžika |
| vulture | uruhua |
| old | zari |
| come here! | kaiem |

According to Nimuendajú (1932), words number 2 to 5, 8, 10, 14, 18, 21, 23, and 26 to 30 were derived from poorly pronounced Guarani, and the rest were all fabricated.

== See also ==
- Oti language
- Ofayé language
- Xavante language
- Uamué language, with a vocabulary similarly fabricated by informants
