= Taquaraçu River =

There are two rivers named Taquaraçu River in Brazil:

- Taquaraçu River (Mato Grosso do Sul)
- Taquaraçu River (Espírito Santo)

== See also ==
- Taquaruçu River, Mato Grosso do Sul, Brazil
- Taquaruçu River (São Paulo), Brazil
