= Chiripa =

Chiripa may refer to:

- Chiripa culture, an archaeological culture of Bolivia
- Chiripá people, a Guaraní subgroup of Paraguay, Argentina and Brazil
- Chiripá language, their language
