= Jauru River =

There are two rivers named Jauru River in Brazil:

- Jauru River (Mato Grosso do Sul)
- Jauru River (Mato Grosso)

== See also ==
- Jaru River, a river of Rondônia, Brazil
- Jauaru River, a river of Pará, Brazil
- Jauru, a city in Mato Grosso, Brazil
