= Perdido River (disambiguation) =

The Perdido River is a river in the U.S. states of Florida and Alabama.

Perdido River may also refer to:

- Perdido River (Paraná), a river in the Brazilian state of Paraná
- Perdido River (Mato Grosso do Sul), a river in the Brazilian state of Mato Grosso do Sul
