= Guareí River =

There are two rivers named Guareí River in Brazil:

- Guareí River (Mato Grosso do Sul)
- Guareí River (São Paulo)

== See also ==
- Guareí, a municipality in São Paulo, Brazil
- Guara River (Parana)
