= Vazante Grande =

River in Mato Grosso do Sul, Brazil

Location
- Country: Brazil

Physical characteristics
- Source
  - location: Mato Grosso do Sul state
- Mouth: Rio Negro
  - coordinates: 19°21′S 56°53′W

The Vazante Grande is a river of Mato Grosso do Sul state in southwestern Brazil.

== See also ==
- List of rivers of Mato Grosso do Sul
