= Coxim =

- Municipality
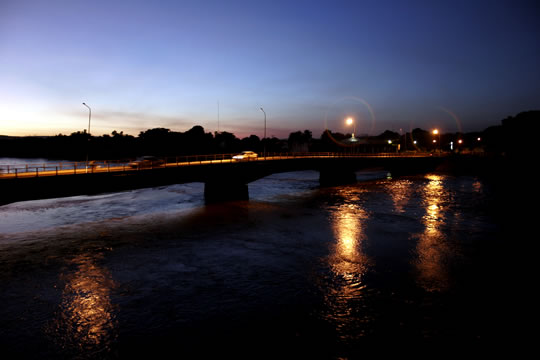

- Flag Coat of arms

- Location in Brazil
- Coordinates: 18°30′25″S 54°45′36″W
- Country: Brazil
- State: Mato Grosso do Sul
- Region: Center-West

Government
  - Mayor: Edilson Magro

Area
  - Total: 6,411.552 km^{2} (2,475.514 sq mi)
- Elevation: 238 m (781 ft)

Population (2020)
  - Total: 33,459
  - Density: 5.2185/km^{2} (13.516/sq mi)
- Demonym: Coxinenses
- Time zone: UTC−4 (AMT)
- Postal Code: 79400-000
- Area code: +55 67
- Website: Official website

Coxim is a municipality located in the Brazilian state of Mato Grosso do Sul. Its population was 33,459 (2020) and its area is 6,412 km^{2} (2,476 sq mi). It was founded in 1729.

It is located at the confluence of the Coxim and Taquari rivers. Its economy is based on tourism, fishing and animal husbandry.
