= Jagui River =

Location
- Country: Brazil

Physical characteristics
- Source
  - location: Mato Grosso do Sul state
- Mouth: Iguatemi River
  - coordinates: 23°43′S 54°39′W

The Jagui River is a river in the state of Mato Grosso do Sul in southwestern Brazil.

== See also ==
- List of rivers of Mato Grosso do Sul
