= Indaiá Grande River =

Location
- Country: Brazil

Physical characteristics
- Source
  - location: Mato Grosso do Sul state
- Mouth: Sucuriú River
  - coordinates: 19°33′S 52°32′W

The Indaiá Grande River is a river of Mato Grosso do Sul state in southwestern Brazil.

== See also ==
- List of rivers of Mato Grosso do Sul
