= Ribeirão Lontra =

Location
- Country: Brazil

Physical characteristics
- Source
  - location: Mato Grosso do Sul state
- Mouth: Anhanduìzinho River
  - coordinates: 21°28′S 53°37′W

The Ribeirão Lontra is a river of Mato Grosso do Sul state in southwestern Brazil.

== See also ==
- List of rivers of Mato Grosso do Sul
