= Nioaque River =

Coordinates: 20°45′54″S 56°05′04″W

Location
- Country: Brazil

Physical characteristics
- Source
  - location: Mato Grosso do Sul state
- Mouth: Miranda River

The Nioaque River is a river of Mato Grosso do Sul state in southwestern Brazil. It is a tributary of the Miranda River, and part of the Paraguay River basin.

== See also ==
- List of rivers of Mato Grosso do Sul
