= Varadouro River =

Location
- Country: Brazil

Physical characteristics
- Source
  - location: Mato Grosso do Sul state
- Mouth: Cachoeirão River
  - coordinates: 20°25′S 55°25′W

The Varadouro River is a river of Mato Grosso do Sul state in southwestern Brazil, and a tributary of Cachoeirão River.

== See also ==
- List of rivers of Mato Grosso do Sul
