= Gymnocalycium marsoneri =

Conservation status
- Least Concern (IUCN 3.1)

Scientific classification
- Kingdom: Plantae
- Clade: Tracheophytes
- Clade: Angiosperms
- Clade: Eudicots
- Order: Caryophyllales
- Family: Cactaceae
- Subfamily: Cactoideae
- Genus: Gymnocalycium
- Species: G. marsoneri

Binomial name
- Gymnocalycium marsoneri Frič ex Y.Itô, 1957

Synonyms
- Gymnocalycium delaetii subsp. marsoneri (Frič ex Y.Itô) H.Till & Amerh., 2008

Species of plant

Gymnocalycium marsoneri is a species of succulent flowering plant in the genus Gymnocalycium, within the family Cactaceae. It is native to northern Argentina, Bolivia, west-central Brazil (specifically, in the state of Mato Grosso do Sul), and Paraguay.

== Description ==
Gymnocalycium marsoneri is a species of small cactus with a primarily solitary habitat, although in cultivation it often produces pups (offsets) from the base and forms clumps. The stem is only slightly higher than the level of the soil; it is globose-flattened in shape. It can reach 7 cm in height (taller in cultivation) and up to 14 cm in diameter. The epidermis is gray-green or olive green in color, and can display dark coppery tinting when exposed to intense sunlight.

The stem has 9 to 21 ribs, divided into large, prominent, rounded tubercles which are arranged in a spiral pattern. On the tubercles are areoles, which usually have 0 central spines and 5 to 7 radial spines. The radial spines are straight or slightly recurved, and reach 2 to 3 cm in length. They are brown towards the apex and lighter in color towards the base when younger, and darken with age.

The flowers are campanulate to infundibuliform in shape. They measure 3 to 3.5 cm in length and 3 to 4.5 cm in diameter. They are variable in color, and may be pale green-white, white, or yellow. The fruit is spherical to slightly ovoid in shape. It is red, puple, or blue-green in color, depending on ripeness. The seeds are almost spherical, with a diameter of approximately 1 mm (including the hilum, which is not very visible). They are light brown in color.

== Distribution and habitat ==
Gymnocalycium marsoneri is native to northern Argentina, Bolivia, west-central Brasil (specifically, in the state of Mato Grosso do Sul), and Paraguay.

It is primarily found in subtropical biomes at altitudes of 500 to 1500 meters above sea level. It grows in the undergrowth of the arid western Chaco.

== Taxonomy ==
Gymnocalycium marsoneri was described by the botanists Alberto Vojtěch Frič and Yoshi Itô, who published the name in the scientific journal in the scientific journal Explanatory Diagram of Austroechinocactinae: 293 in 1957.

Etymology

- Gymnocalycium: The genus name is derived from the Greek terms gymnos (meaning "naked") and kalyk (meaning "chalice"). This references the naked (without hair, bristles, or spines) floral tubes of the flowers of this genus.
- marsoneri: the specific epithet honors the Argentinian cactus collector Oreste Marsoner.

=== Subspecies ===
Currently, two subspecies are recognized by Plants of the World Online:

Image	Subspecies	Description	Distribution
	Gymnocalycium marsoneri subsp. marsoneri	9 to 15 ribs. Fruits are purple or red.	Northern Argentina (Chaco)
	Gymnocalycium marsoneri subsp. matoense (Buining & Brederoo) P.J.Braun & Esteves, 1995	Approximately 21 ribs. Fruits are blue-green.	Bolivia, west-central Brazil (Mato Grosso do Sul), Paraguay

Synonyms

Synonyms of Gymnocalycium marsoneri subsp. marsoneri:
  - Gymnocalycium fricianum Plesník, 1964
  - Gymnocalycium hamatum F.Ritter, 1980
  - Gymnocalycium tudae Y.Itô, 1957
- Synonyms of Gymnocalycium marsoneri subsp. matoense:
  - Gymnocalycium eytianum Cárdenas, 1958
  - Gymnocalycium friedrichii subsp. eytianum (Cárdenas) H.Till & Amerh., 2008, nom. inval.
  - Gymnocalycium itatiquense H.Till & Amerh., 2009
  - Gymnocalycium matoense Buining & Brederoo, 1975
  - Gymnocalycium marsoneri subsp. megatae (Y.Itô) G.J.Charles, 2009
  - Gymnocalycium megatae Y.Itô, 1957
  - Gymnocalycium megatae var. che-guevarae Milt, 2016
  - Gymnocalycium megatae subsp. matoense (Buining & Brederoo) H.Till, 2008
  - Gymnocalycium megatae subsp. zecheri Amerh., 2010
  - Gymnocalycium onychacanthum Y.Itô, 1957
  - Gymnocalycium pflanzii var. eytianum (Cárdenas) Donald, 1971
  - Gymnocalycium pseudomalacocarpum Backeb., 1966
  - Gymnocalycium tudae var. bolivianum F.Ritter, 1980
  - Gymnocalycium tudae var. pseudomalacocarpum (Backeb.) Donald, 1971

== Conservation status ==
On the IUCN Red List, Gymnocalycium marsoneri is classified as being of Least Concern (LC), signifying that currently, the species does not face a significant risk of extinction on a global scale due to its wide distribution and local abundance, as well as the lack of known significant threats.

== Cultivation ==
This species of cactus is cultivated primarily as an ornamental; it is easy to grow. It grows relatively quickly during the summer, and can form clumps under good conditions. It does best in highly porous substrates with low pH and without an excessive amount of calcium, as well as a well-draining pot with enough room for the plant's roots. It should be transplanted every other year, or when needed.

During summer, it should be watered moderately or abundantly, although excessive watering can cause rot. Fertilize in summer with a fertilizer rich in potassium. In winter, the plant should be kept dry, with temperatures above 0 ºC (32 ºF). It tolerates light frosts if kept dry, and is hardy to -5 ºC (23 ºF) for short periods.

It grows best in well-lit conditions, although it prefers filtered light ot light shade in the hottest parts of the year; indoors, it needs high light and some direct sun. Intense sunlight induces flowering and spine production, although excessively intense sunlight may cause damage.

Under good conditions, it is not greatly affected by pests, although spider mites, mealybugs (especially root mealybugs), and occasionally scale insects can be problematic. Rot is caused by excessive watering and/or insufficient ventilation.

Gymnocalycium marsoneri may be propagated by the division of clumps or by seed. Seeds should be sown after the last frost, and cuttings should be allowed to callus for a time before planting. The seeds germinate best at temperatures of 21 - 27 ºC (69.8 - 80.6 ºF). Young plants should have ventilation, and should be protected from direct sunlight.

== Gallery ==
Growth form

Flower buds

Plant in flower

Flower

Fruits
