= São João River (Mato Grosso do Sul) =

Location
- Country: Brazil

Physical characteristics
- Source
  - location: Mato Grosso do Sul state
- Mouth: Dourados River
  - coordinates: 22°12′47″S 55°19′56″W

The São João River is a tributary of the Dourados River in Mato Grosso do Sul state, southwestern Brazil.

== See also ==
- List of rivers of Mato Grosso do Sul
