= Barreiro =

Barreiro may refer to:

== People ==
- Bruno Barreiro (born 1965), American politician
- Gustavo Barreiro (1959–2019), American politician
- Jose Carlos Barreiro, São Toméan politician
- Manu Barreiro (born 1986), Spanish footballer
- Guzmán Barreiro (born in 1982), former Uruguayan rugby union player

== Places ==
- Barreiro, Portugal
  - Barreiro railway station
- Barreiro, Cape Verde, a town in Cape Verde
- Barreiro River (disambiguation), several rivers in Brazil and Portugal

== See also ==
- Barreiros (disambiguation)
