= Ağaverdioba =

- Municipality
- Location within Azerbaijan
- Coordinates: 41°35′54″N 48°39′28″E
- Country: Azerbaijan
- Rayon: Khachmaz

Population
  - Total: 549
- Time zone: UTC+4 (AZT)
  - Summer (DST): UTC+5 (AZT)

Ağaverdioba is a village and municipality in the Khachmaz Rayon of Azerbaijan. It has a population of 549.

- Ağaverdioba at GEOnet Names Server
