= Barreiros =

Barreiros may refer to:

== People with the surname ==
- Acácio Barreiros (1943–2004), Portuguese politician
- João Barreiros (born 1952), Portuguese writer, editor, translator and critic
- Quim Barreiros (born 1947), Portuguese singer and songwriter
- Ricardo Barreiros (born 1982), Portuguese roller hockey player
- Susana Barreiros (born 1981), Venezuelan judge

== Places ==
=== Brazil ===
- Barreiros, Pernambuco, a municipality in the State of Pernambuco
- Barreiros River (Mato Grosso do Sul)
- Barreiros River (Tocantins)

=== Portugal ===
- Barreiros (Amares), a civil parish in the municipality of Amares
- Barreiros, Póvoa de Varzim
- Barreiros (Mirando do Douro), a civil parish in the municipality of Miranda do Douro
- Barreiros (Valpaços), a civil parish in the municipality of Valpaços
- Barreiros (Viseu), a civil parish in the municipality of Viseu
- Estádio dos Barreiros, a multi-purpose stadium in Funchal

=== Spain ===
- Barreiros, Lugo, a municipality of the Province of Lugo

== Other ==
- Barreiros (manufacturer), a Spanish manufacturer of tractors, trucks and cars

== See also ==
- Barreiro (disambiguation)
