= Barreiro River =

Barreiro River or Barreiros River may refer to the following rivers in Brazil:

- Barreiro River (Mato Grosso)
- Barreiro River (Paraná)
- Barreiros River (Mato Grosso do Sul)
- Barreiros River (Tocantins)
- Barreiro de Baixo River
