= Cachoeirão River =

Location
- Country: Brazil

Physical characteristics
- Source
  - location: Mato Grosso do Sul state
- Mouth: Aquidauana River
  - coordinates: 20°27′S 55°23′W

The Cachoeirão River is a river of Mato Grosso do Sul state in southwestern Brazil. It is a tributary of the Aquidauana River.

== See also ==
- List of rivers of Mato Grosso do Sul
