= Pântano River =

Coordinates: 20°22′S 51°20′W

Location
- Country: Brazil

Physical characteristics
- Source
  - location: Mato Grosso do Sul state

The Pântano River is a river of Mato Grosso do Sul state in southwestern Brazil.

== See also ==
- List of rivers of Mato Grosso do Sul
