= Chiripá people =

Indigenous people of Argentina, Brazil and Paraguay

Chiripá
Total population
- 42,600

Regions with significant populations
- Argentina: 19,000
- Paraguay: 14,500
- Brazil: 9,100

Languages
- Ava Guarani • Portuguese • Spanish

The Chiripá (Note: Also called the Avá-Guaranies of Paraguay, Avakatuetés, Avá Katú etés, Avá Chiripás, Tsiripá and/or Apytaré self-proclaimed Ñandéva in Brazil.) are a Guaraní indigenous people who live mainly in Paraguay in the area bounded by the Paraná River and the Acaray and Jejuí Rivers, while in Brazil they coexist with other Guaraní groups in villages in the states of Mato Grosso do Sul (where they are simply called Guaraní), Paraná and São Paulo. In Argentina they are found in small groups living among the Mbyas in the province of Misiones. They are highly acculturated there but maintain their dialects and religious traditions.

== Demographics ==
In Paraguay, around 2002, there were 6918 people of this ethnic group (and 1900 speakers of the language). According to the results of the III National Population and Housing Census for Indigenous Peoples of 2012, there were 17,697 Avá Guaranis, 9,448 in whom live in the Canindeyú Department, 5,061 in the Alto Paraná Department, 1,524 in the San Pedro Department, 946 in the Caaguazú Department, 379 in Asunción and the Central Department, and 142 in the Concepción Department.

In Argentina, the Avá Guaraní live in small groups among the Mbyá in Misiones Province. In the village of Fortín Mbororé, near Puerto Iguazú, there is an important group that lives with a Mbyá majority. They are highly adapted but retain their dialects and religious traditions. The 2010 Argentina census revealed the existence of 422 people who identified themselves as Avá Guaraní in the province of Misiones and 104 in the province of Corrientes, but it is impossible to distinguish how many of them may belong to the Chiriguano group.

There are still about 4,900 Avá Chiripá (also Avakatueté or Avá katú eté), Tsiripá or Apytaré (also Ñandéva) in Brazil. The Ñandéva language is spoken in the Brazilian states of Mato Grosso do Sul and Paraná, on the Iguatemi River and its tributaries, equally near the confluence of the Paraná and Iguatemi Rivers.
