= Nabileque River =

Coordinates: 20°56′00″S 57°50′05″W

Location
- Country: Brazil

Physical characteristics
- Source
  - location: Mato Grosso do Sul state

The Nabileque River is a river of Mato Grosso do Sul state in southwestern Brazil.

== See also ==
- List of rivers of Mato Grosso do Sul
