= Santana River (Mato Grosso do Sul) =

Location
- Country: Brazil

Physical characteristics
- Source
  - location: Mato Grosso do Sul state
- Mouth: Paranaíba River
  - coordinates: 19°43′S 51°3′W

The Santana River is a river of Mato Grosso do Sul state in southwestern Brazil.

== See also ==
- List of rivers of Mato Grosso do Sul
