= Combate River =

Coordinates: 22°22′S 52°48′W

Location
- Country: Brazil

Physical characteristics
- Source
  - location: Mato Grosso do Sul state

The Combate River is a river of Mato Grosso do Sul state in southwestern Brazil. It is a constituent of the Paraná River basin.

== See also ==
- List of rivers of Mato Grosso do Sul
