= Hypostomus khimaera =

Scientific classification
- Kingdom: Animalia
- Phylum: Chordata
- Class: Actinopterygii
- Division: Teleostei
- Order: Siluriformes
- Family: Loricariidae
- Genus: Hypostomus
- Species: H. khimaera

Binomial name
- Hypostomus khimaera Tencatt, Zawadzki & Froehlich, 2014

Species of fish

Hypostomus khimaera is a species of catfish in the family Loricariidae. It is native to South America, where it occurs in the Paraguay River basin in Brazil. It is typically seen in small streams, including the Aquidauana River basin, where it is known from the margins of deeper, sandy areas. It is known to be syntopic with Hypostomus cochliodon in several parts of its range. The species reaches 16.4 cm (6.5 inches) SL and is believed to be a facultative air-breather. Its specific epithet, khimaera, derives from Greek and refers to the mythical chimera, as H. khimaera possesses features normally associated with multiple distinct species.
