= Quitéria River =

Location
- Country: Brazil

Physical characteristics
- Source
  - location: Mato Grosso do Sul state
- Mouth: Paraná River
  - coordinates: 20°16′S 51°8′W

The Quitéria River is a river of Mato Grosso do Sul state in southwestern Brazil.

== See also ==
- List of rivers of Mato Grosso do Sul
