= Taquaraçu River (Mato Grosso do Sul) =

Location
- Country: Brazil

Physical characteristics
- Source
  - location: Mato Grosso do Sul state
- Mouth: Aquidauana River
  - coordinates: 20°29′S 55°47′W

The Taquaraçu River is a river of Mato Grosso do Sul state in southwestern Brazil. A tributary of the Aquidauana River, the Taquaraçu is part of the Paraguay River basin.

== See also ==
- List of rivers of Mato Grosso do Sul
