= Jordão River (Paraná) =

River in Brazil

Coordinates: 25°46′27″S 52°7′23″W

Location
- Country: Brazil

Physical characteristics
- Source
  - location: Paraná state
- Mouth
  - location: Iguazu River

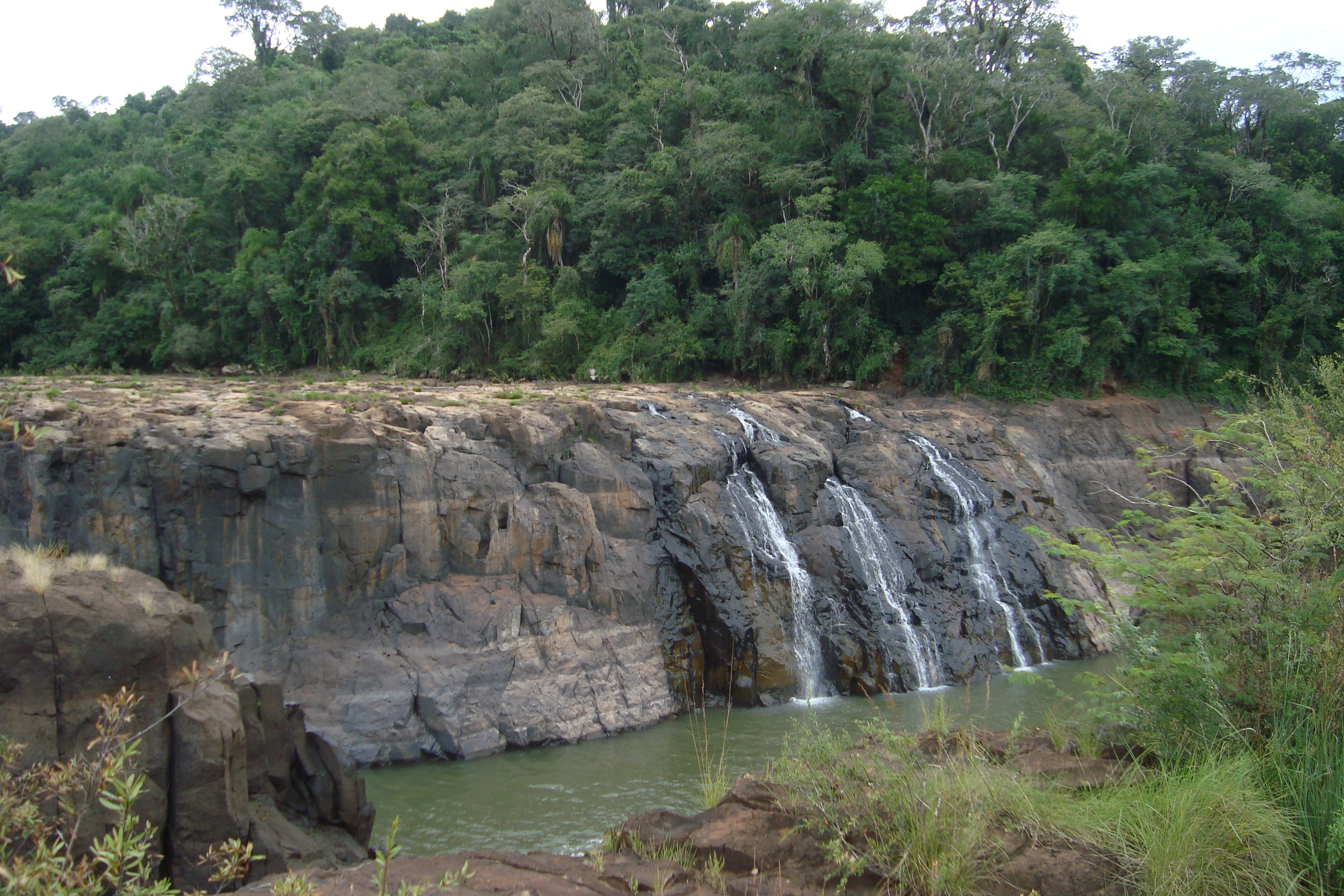
River mouth of Jordão river

The Jordão River (Portuguese, Rio Jordão) is a river of Paraná state in southern Brazil. It is a tributary of the Iguazu River.

== See also ==
- List of rivers of Paraná
- Tributaries of the Río de la Plata
