= Piripucu River =

Coordinates: 22°14′30″S 56°47′20″W

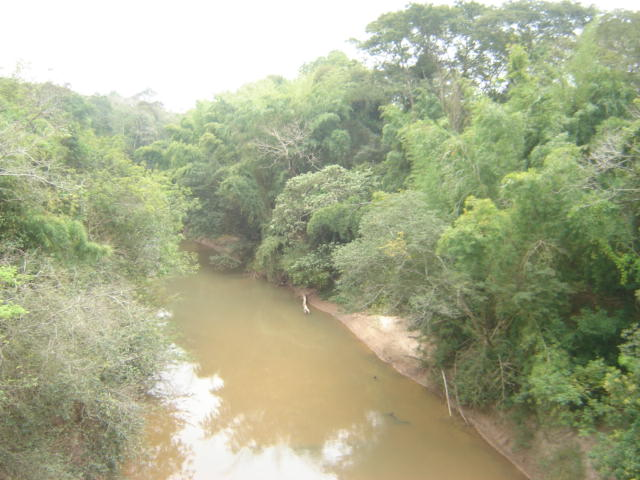

Location
- Country: Brazil

Physical characteristics
- Source
  - location: Mato Grosso do Sul state

The Piripucu River is a river of Mato Grosso do Sul state in southwestern Brazil.

== See also ==
- List of rivers of Mato Grosso do Sul
