= Maria Pankararu =

Brazilian linguist

- Born: Maria das Dores de Oliveira; 1964 (age 61–62); Brejo dos Padres, Tacaratu (Pernambuco, Brazil)
- Other name: Maria Pankararu
- Occupation: linguist

Academic background
- Education: Universidade Federal de Alagoas
- Thesis: Ofayé, a língua do Povo do Mel. Fonologia e Gramática (2006)
- Doctoral advisor: Januacele Francisca da Costa, Adair Pimentel Palácio

Academic work
- Institutions: FUNAI, Ilhéus
- Main interests: Ofayé language

Maria das Dores de Oliveira (born 1964), better known as Maria Pankararu, is a Pankararú linguist. She is best known as the first indigenous scholar to have obtained a doctoral degree in Brazil. Her research has focused on the description of the moribund Ofayé language of the Macro-Jê language family, spoken in Brasilândia, Mato Grosso do Sul.

== Biography ==
Born in Tacaratu (Pernambuco), Pankararu accompanied her family to São Paulo in 1970, where she studied until the seventh grade before returning to Tacaratu. She obtained a BA in History at Autarquia de Ensino Superior de Arco Verde in Arcoverde (1990), as well as a second BA in Pedagogy (1997), an MA and a PhD in Linguistics at Universidade Federal de Alagoas in Maceió.

== Awards ==
- Medalha do Mérito Universitário "UFAL 45 Anos" (2006)
- Heliônia Ceres Prize (2005)

== Selected works ==
=== Dissertations ===
- Ofayé, a língua do Povo do Mel. Fonologia e Gramática (2006)
- A Variação Fonética da Vibrante /r/ na Fala Pankararu. Análise Lingüística e Sociolingüística (2001)

=== Articles ===
- O verbo em Ofayé: aspectos morfológicos. In: Eliane Barbosa da Silva; Helson Flávio da Silva Sobrinho (orgs.). Língua Falada e Ensino. Reflexões e análises. 1ª ed. Maceió/AL: EDUFAL, 2014, p. 17-19.
- As políticas públicas de educação superior para indígenas e afrodescendentes no Brasil: Perspectivas e Desafios. In: MATO, Daniel (Coord.). Educación Superior y Pueblos Indígenas y Afrodescendientes en América Latina. Normas, Políticas y Prácticas. 2ª ed. Caracas: IELSAC-UNESCO, 2012, p. 177-210.
- A morfologia nominal da língua Ofayé. In: LUCIANO, Gersem José dos Santos; HOFFMANN, Maria Barroso; OLIVEIRA, Jô Cardoso (Orgs.). Olhares indígenas contemporâneos. 1ª ed. Brasília: Centro Indígena de Estudos e Pesquisa - CINEP, 2012, v. II, p. 22-56.
- A classe verbo em Ofaié: aspectos sintáticos. Leitura. Revista do Programa de Pós-Graduação em Letras (UFAL), v. 35, p. 109-131, 2007.
- Notas sobre o povo Ofayé e aspectos da fonologia da língua Ofayé. Coletânia AXÉUVYRU, Ed. Universitária da UFPE, p. 141-158, 2005.
- Da invisibilidade para a visibilidade: estratégias Pankararu. Índios do Nordeste: Temas e Problemas 4, EDUFAL, v. 4, p. 05-24, 2004.
- Variação fonética da vibrante /r/ na fala Pankararu: Análise de fatores lingüísticos. Leitura. Revista do Programa de Pós-Graduação em Letras (UFAL), Maceió - Alagoas, n.25, p. 47-60, 2000.
- A variação do /s/ na fala Pankararu - fatores lingüísticos e sociais. In: Maria Denilda Moura. (Org.). Os múltiplos usos da língua. 1ª ed. Maceió: Edufal, 1999, p. 237-239.
