= Tarunã River =

Location
- Country: Brazil

Physical characteristics
- Source
  - location: Mato Grosso do Sul state
- Mouth: Paraguay River
  - coordinates: 21°35′09″S 57°54′44″W

The Tarunã River is a river of Mato Grosso do Sul state in southwestern Brazil.The Rio Tarumã is part of the Rio Paraná watershed, and a tributary of the Paraguay River.

== See also ==
- List of rivers of Mato Grosso do Sul
