= Novo River (Paraguay River tributary) =

Location
- Country: Brazil

Physical characteristics
- Source
  - location: Mato Grosso do Sul state
- Mouth: Paraguay River
  - coordinates: 19°35′S 57°26′W

The Novo River is a river of Mato Grosso do Sul state in southwestern Brazil. It is a tributary of the Paraguay River.

== See also ==
- List of rivers of Mato Grosso do Sul
