= Alberto Vojtěch Frič =

Czech botanist, ethnographer, writer and explorer

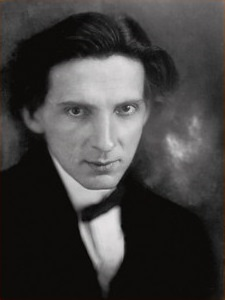

Alberto Vojtěch Frič (Czech pronunciation: [ˈalbɛrto ˈvojcɛx ˈfrɪtʃ], 8 September 1882 Prague – 4 December 1944 Prague) was a Czechoslovak botanist, ethnographer, writer and explorer. He undertook 8 voyages to America, discovered, described and catalogued many species of cactus. South American Indians called him Karaí Pukú 'Long Man'; in Europe he became known as Cactus Hunter.

== Credited ==
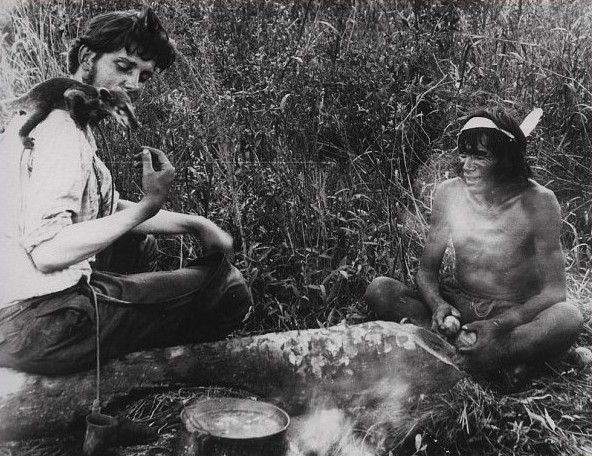
Alberto Frič (Brasil, 1906)

- Lophophora alberto-vojtechii
- Lophophora fricii
- Stenocereus fricii
- Cleistocactus strausii var. fricii
- Notocactus fricii synonymum Malacocarpus fricii, Wigginsia fricii
- Airampoa
- Chaffeyopuntia
- Pseudotephrocactus
- Salmiopuntia
- Subulatopuntia
- Weberiopuntia

== See also ==
- Kukurá language
