= Taboco River =

Coordinates: 19°40′S 55°49′W

Location
- Country: Brazil

Physical characteristics
- Source
  - location: Mato Grosso do Sul state

The Taboco River is a river of Mato Grosso do Sul state in southwestern Brazil.

== See also ==
- List of rivers of Mato Grosso do Sul
