= Salobra River =

- Location within Brazil

Location
- Country: Brazil

Physical characteristics
- Source
  - location: Mato Grosso do Sul state
- Mouth: Miranda River
  - coordinates: 20°02′00″S 56°48′33″W

The Salobra River is a river of Mato Grosso do Sul state in Midwest Brazil. It is a tributary of the Miranda River, itself a part of the Paraguay River basin.

The vegetation surrounding the Salobra is mainly evergreen deciduous forest growth. The area surrounding the river is sparsely populated, with 4 inhabitants/km². The climate of the area is predominantly Savanna. The average annual temperature in the area is 24°C. The warmest month is November, when the average temperature is 26°C, and the coldest is July, with 20°C. The average annual rainfall is 1.6 meters. The wettest month is November, with an average of 201 mm of precipitation, and the driest is August, with 2 mm of precipitation.

== See also ==
- List of rivers of Mato Grosso do Sul

== Sources ==
- Brazilian Ministry of Transport
- Rand McNally, The New International Atlas, 1993.
