= Dourados River (Mato Grosso do Sul) =

Location
- Country: Brazil

Physical characteristics
- Source
  - location: Mato Grosso do Sul state
- Mouth: Brilhante River
  - coordinates: 21°57′15″S 54°13′54″W

The Dourados River is a tributary of the Brilhante River in Mato Grosso do Sul state, southwestern Brazil.
