= Anhanduìzinho River =

Coordinates: 21°34′S 53°36′W

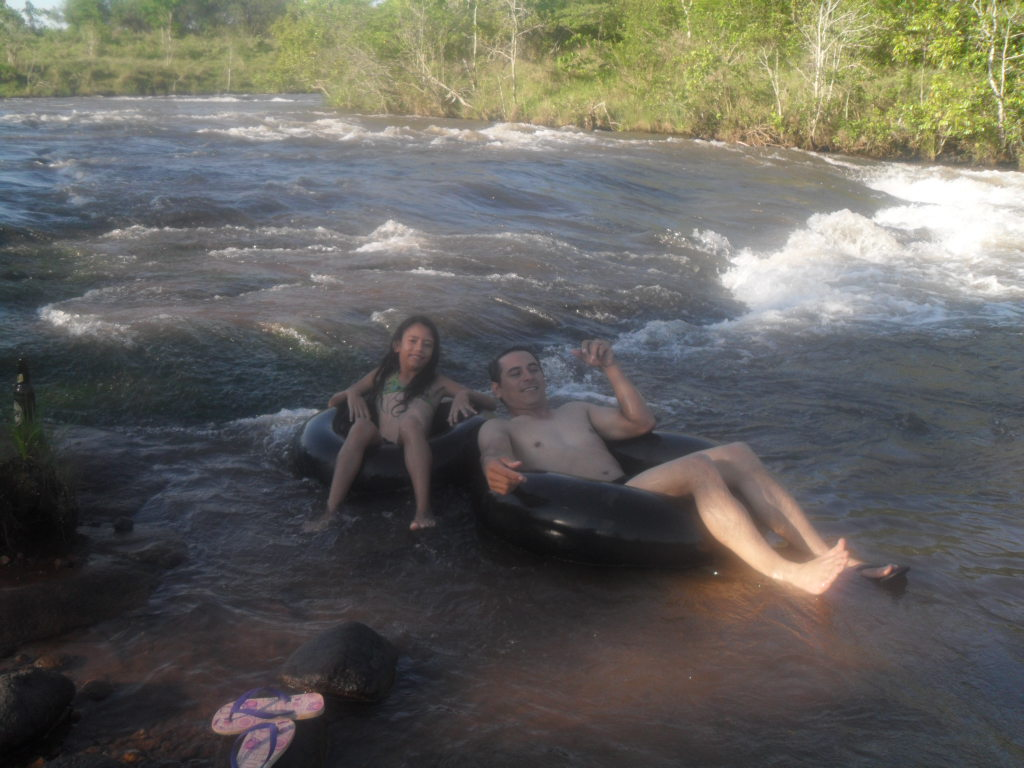

Location
- Country: Brazil

Physical characteristics
- Source
  - location: Mato Grosso do Sul state

The Anhanduìzinho River is a river of Mato Grosso do Sul state in southwestern Brazil.

== See also ==
- List of rivers of Mato Grosso do Sul
