= Aquidabã River (Mato Grosso do Sul) =

Location
- Country: Brazil

Physical characteristics
- Source
  - location: Mato Grosso do Sul state
- Mouth: Paraguay River
  - coordinates: 20°58′S 57°50′W

The Aquidabã River is a river of Mato Grosso do Sul state in southwestern Brazil.

== See also ==
- List of rivers of Mato Grosso do Sul
