= GEOnet Names Server =

U.S. database of geographical objects

The GEOnet Names Server (GNS), sometimes also referred to in official documentation as Geographic Names Data or geonames in domain and email addresses, is a service that provides access to the United States National Geospatial-Intelligence Agency's (NGA) and the US Board on Geographic Names's (BGN) database of geographic feature names and coordinates for locations outside the US. The database is the official repository for the US federal government on foreign place-name decisions approved by the BGN. Approximately 20,000 of the database's features are updated monthly. Names are not deleted from the database, "except in cases of obvious duplication". The database contains search aids such as spelling variations and non-Roman script spellings in addition to its primary information about location, administrative division, and quality. The accuracy of the database had been criticized.

== Accuracy ==
US forces serving in Afghanistan in 2004 reported numerous instances of incorrect place-names, and incorrectly placed or absent place-names that were sourced ultimately to the Geographic Names Database.

A 2008 survey of South Korea toponyms on GNS found that roughly 1% of them were actually Japanese names that had never been in common usage, even during the period of Japanese colonial rule in Korea, and had come from a 1946 US military map that had apparently been compiled with Japanese assistance. In addition to the Japanese toponyms, the same study noted that "There are many spelling errors and simple mis-understanding of the place names with similar characters" amongst South Korea toponyms on GNS, as well extraneous names of Chinese and English origin.

== See also ==
- Geographic Names Information System (GNIS), a similar database for locations within the United States
- United Nations Conference on the Standardization of Geographical Names
