= Apiai-Guaçu River =

Coordinates: 23.5822°S 48.6095°W

Location
- Country: Brazil

Physical characteristics
- Source
  - location: São Paulo state

The Apiai-Guaçu River is a river of São Paulo state in southeastern Brazil.

== See also ==
- List of rivers of São Paulo
