= Barreiros River (Mato Grosso do Sul) =

Location
- Country: Brazil

Physical characteristics
- Source
  - location: Mato Grosso do Sul state
- Mouth: Paranaíba River
  - coordinates: 19°37′S 51°0′W

The Barreiros River (Mato Grosso do Sul) is a river of Mato Grosso do Sul state in southwestern Brazil.

== See also ==
- List of rivers of Mato Grosso do Sul
