= Taquari-Guaçu River =

Taquari-Guaçu River Taquari River
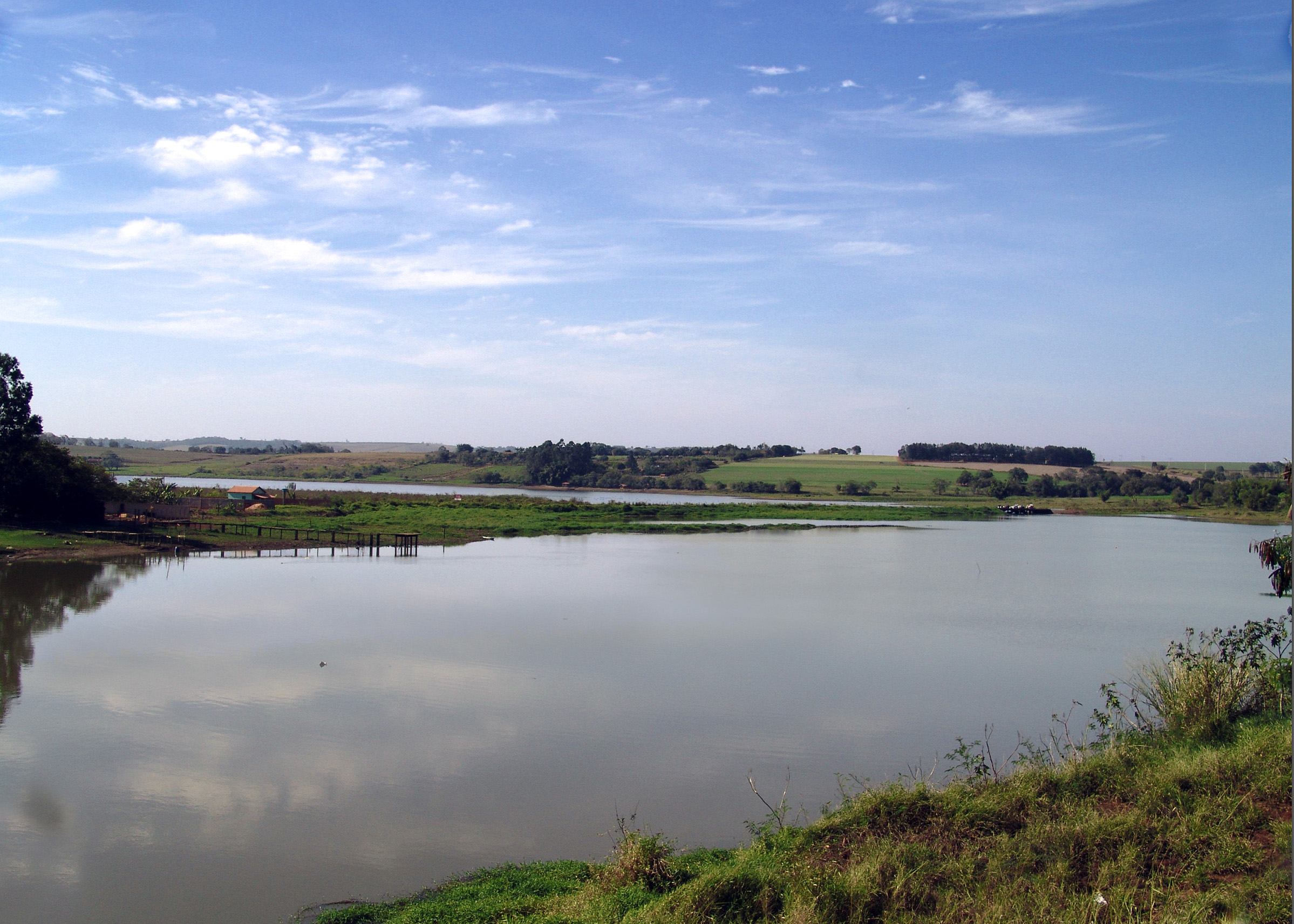

Location
- Country: Brazil

Physical characteristics
- Source
  - location: São Paulo state
- Mouth: Paranapanema River
  - coordinates: 23°16′S 49°12′W

The Taquari-Guaçu or simply Taquari River is a river of São Paulo state in southeastern Brazil.

== See also ==
- List of rivers of São Paulo
