= Maracaju Mountain Range =

Mountain range in Brazil

Maracaju Mountain Range (Portuguese: Serra de Maracaju) is located in Mato Grosso do Sul.
