= Coxim River =

Coordinates: 18°31′42″S 54°44′20″W

Location
- Country: Brazil

Physical characteristics
- Source
  - location: Mato Grosso do Sul state
- Mouth
  - location: Taquari River

The Coxim River is a river of Mato Grosso do Sul state in southwestern Brazil. It is a tributary of the Taquari River.

== See also ==
- List of rivers of Mato Grosso do Sul
