= Aquidauana River =

Coordinates: 19°44′S 56°50′W

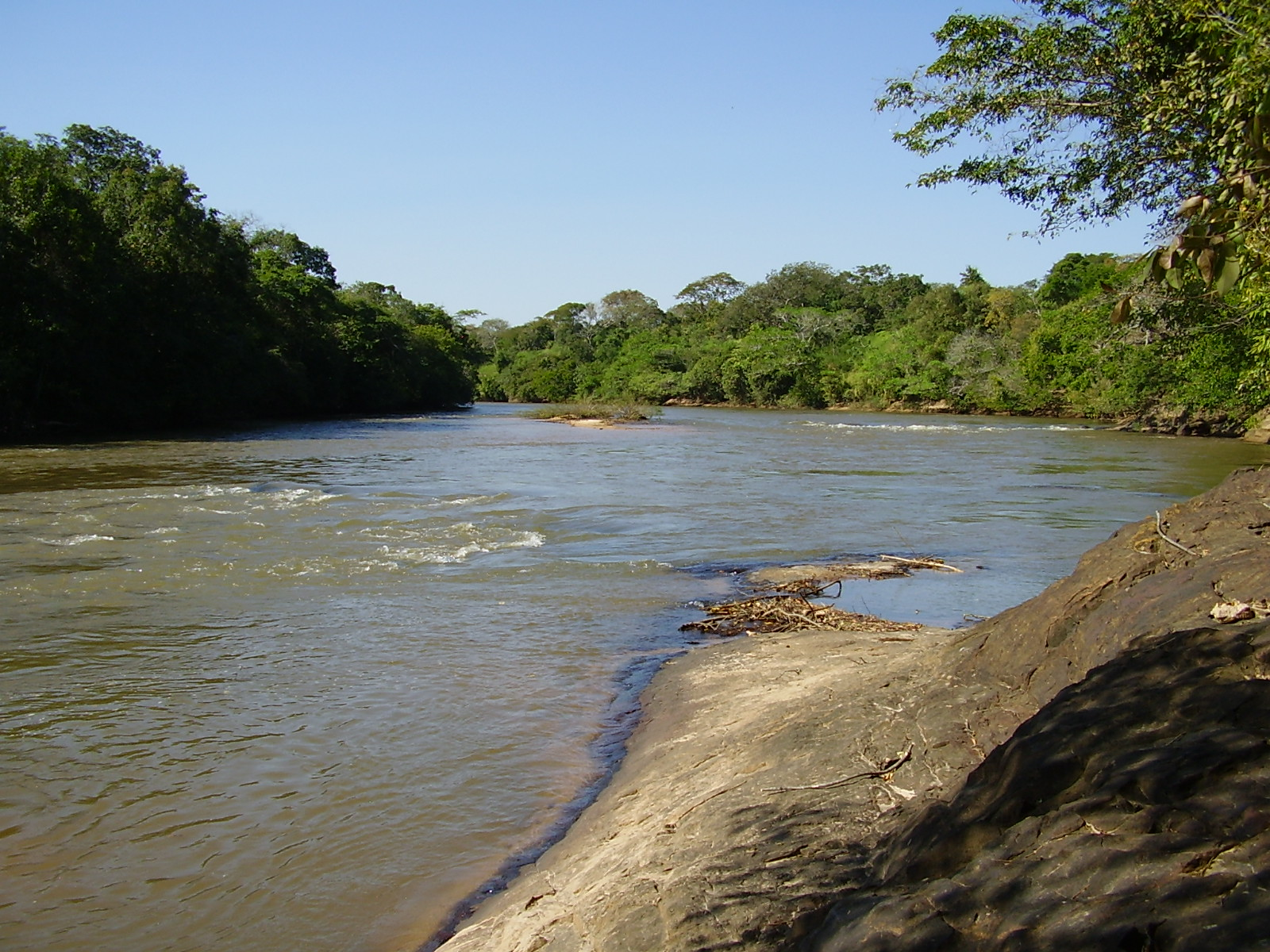

Location
- Country: Brazil

Physical characteristics
- Source
  - location: Maracaju Mountain Range, Mato Grosso do Sul
- Mouth
  - location: Miranda River, Mato Grosso do Sul
- Length: 1,200 km (750 mi)

The Aquidauana River is a river of Mato Grosso do Sul state in southwestern Brazil. It is a tributary of the Miranda River, itself a part of the Paraguay River basin.

== See also ==
- List of rivers of Mato Grosso do Sul
