= Sucuriú River =

Coordinates: 20°42′43″S 51°39′36″W

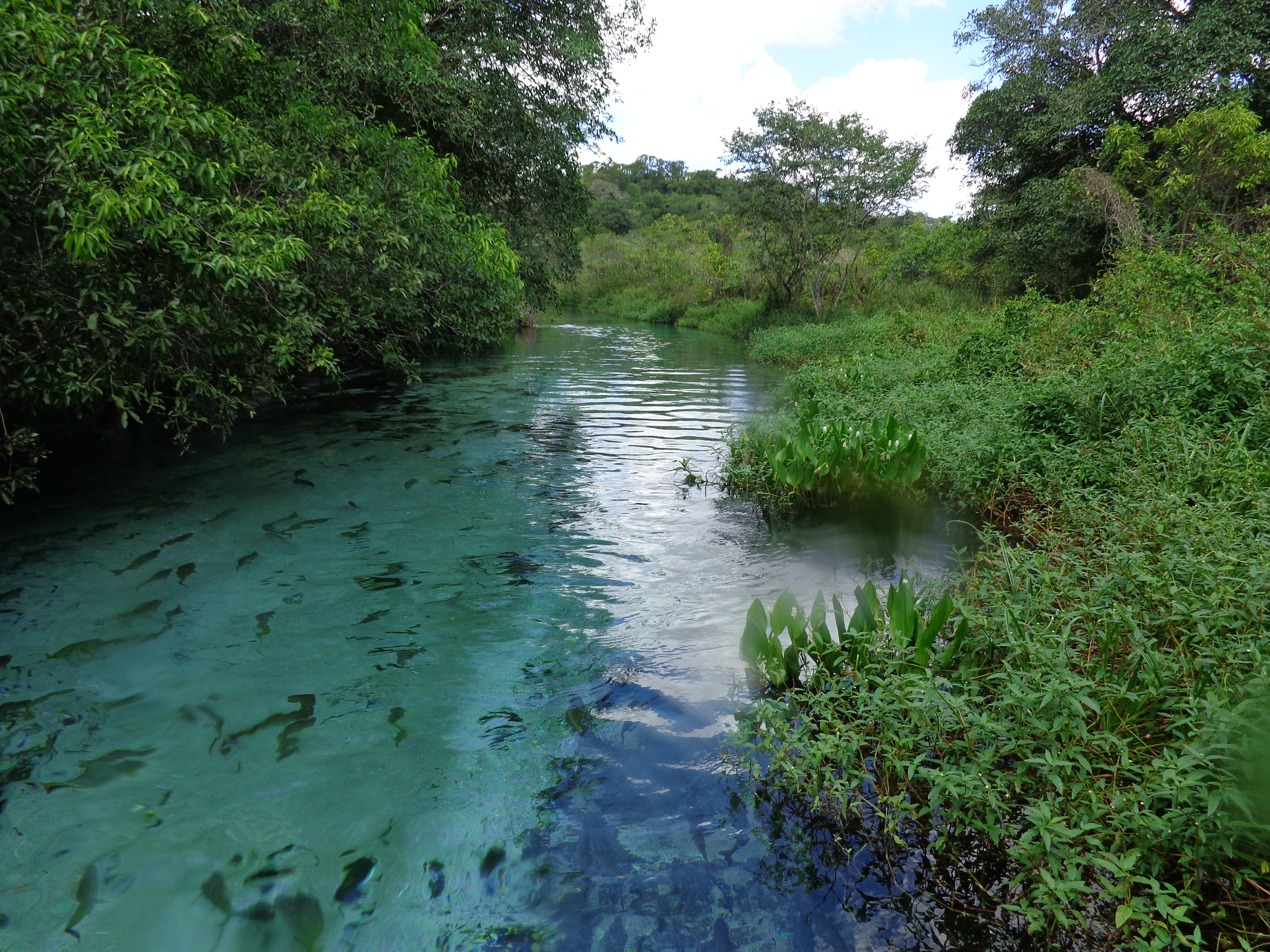

Location
- Country: Brazil

Physical characteristics
- Source
  - location: Mato Grosso do Sul state
- Mouth
  - location: Paraná River

The Sucuriú River (Portuguese, Rio Sucuriú) is a river located in the Mato Grosso do Sul state in southwestern Brazil. It is a tributary of the Paraná River, which it joins just upriver of Eng Souza Dias (Jupiá) Dam.

== See also ==
- List of rivers of Mato Grosso do Sul
- Tributaries of the Río de la Plata
