= Pardo River (Mato Grosso do Sul) =

Coordinates: 21°39′51″S 52°13′27″W

Location
- Country: Brazil

Physical characteristics
- Source
  - location: Mato Grosso do Sul state
- Mouth
  - location: Paraná River
- Length: 600 km (370 mi)
- Basin size: 39,419.36 km^{2} (15,219.90 sq mi)
- Discharge
  - average: 529 m^{3}/s (18,700 cu ft/s)

The Pardo River (Portuguese, Rio Pardo) is a river of Mato Grosso do Sul state in southwestern Brazil. It is a tributary of the Paraná River, which it enters in the reservoir of Sérgio Motta Dam.

== See also ==
- List of rivers of Mato Grosso do Sul
- Tributaries of the Río de la Plata
