= Rio Verde (Mato Grosso do Sul) =

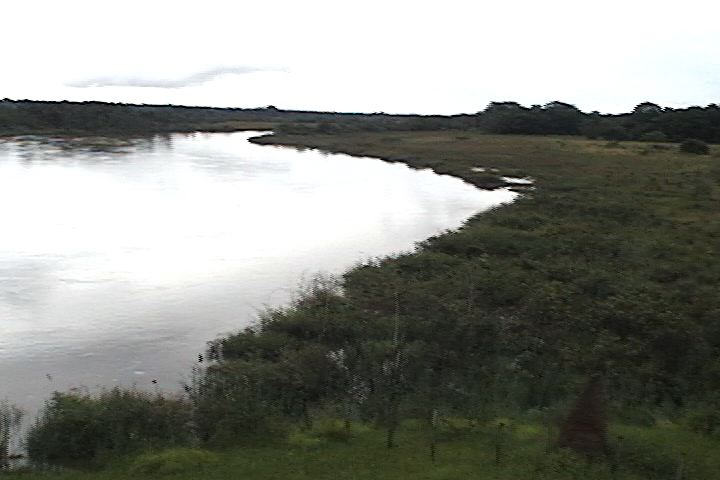
- Rio Verde between Três Lagoas and Brasilândia

- Location within Brazil

Location
- Country: Brazil

Physical characteristics
- Source
  - coordinates: 18.766913°S 53.728398°W
- Mouth
  - coordinates: 21.181545°S 51.896687°W

Basin features
- River system: Paraná River

The Rio Verde is a river in the state of Mato Grosso do Sul, Brazil. It is a tributary of the Paraná River.

The Cisalpina Private Natural Heritage Reserve protects the region where the Rio Verde and Paraná River converge, and contains a complex system of interconnected lagoons, streams and channels connected to the channel of the Paraná, which has shifted its bed to the east over time. There are traces of old channels of the Paraná dating back 10,000 to 40,000 years.

== See also ==
- List of rivers of Mato Grosso do Sul

== Sources ==
- Brazilian Ministry of Transport
- Rand McNally, The New International Atlas, 1993.
- Unidades de Conservação (in Portuguese), CSEP: Companhia Energética de São Paulo, archived from the original on 2014-05-02
