= Iguatemi River =

Coordinates: 23°55′27″S 54°09′20″W

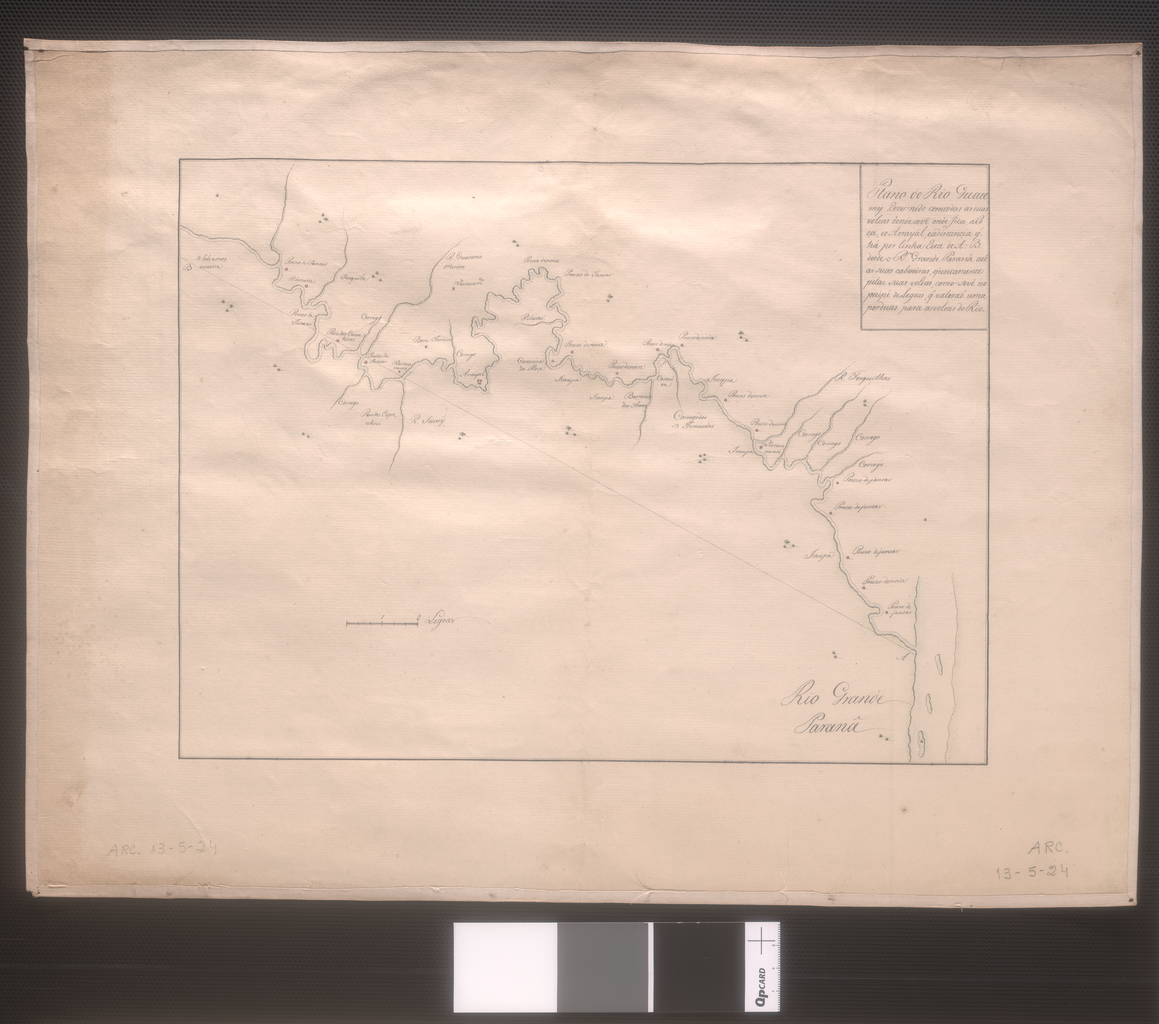

Location
- Country: Brazil

Physical characteristics
- Source
  - location: Mato Grosso do Sul state

The Iguatemi River is a river of Mato Grosso do Sul state in southwestern Brazil.

== See also ==
- List of rivers of Mato Grosso do Sul
