= Rio Negro (Mato Grosso do Sul) =

Coordinates: 19°14′20″S 57°13′15″W

Negro River
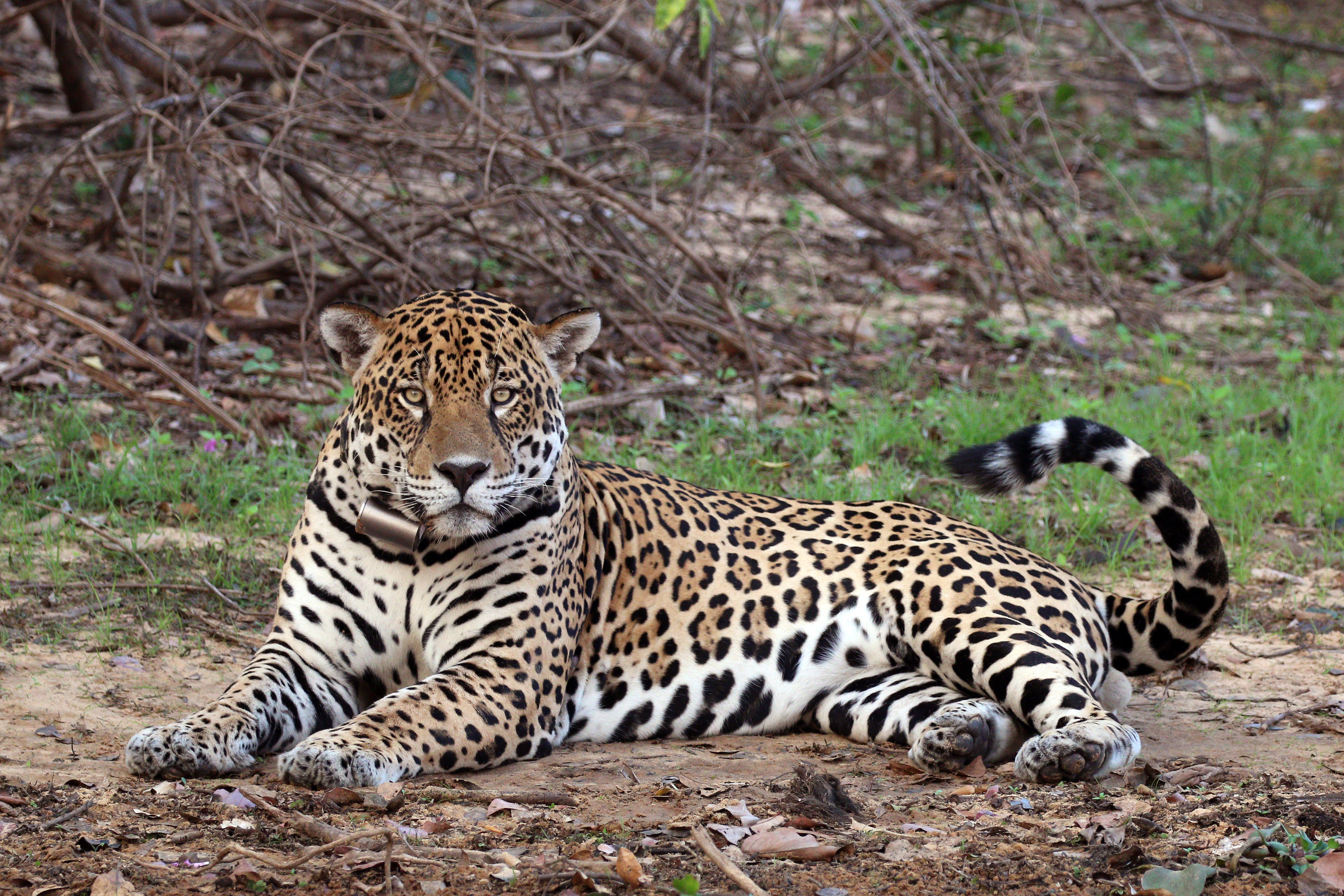
- A male Pantanal jaguar near Rio Negro

Location
- Country: Brazil

Physical characteristics
- Source
  - location: Mato Grosso do Sul State
- Mouth
  - location: Paraguay River

The Rio Negro (Portuguese for "black river") is a river of Mato Grosso do Sul state in southwestern Brazil.

== See also ==
- List of rivers of Mato Grosso do Sul
- Pantanal jaguar
