= Apa River =

Coordinates: 22°5′26″S 57°59′24″W

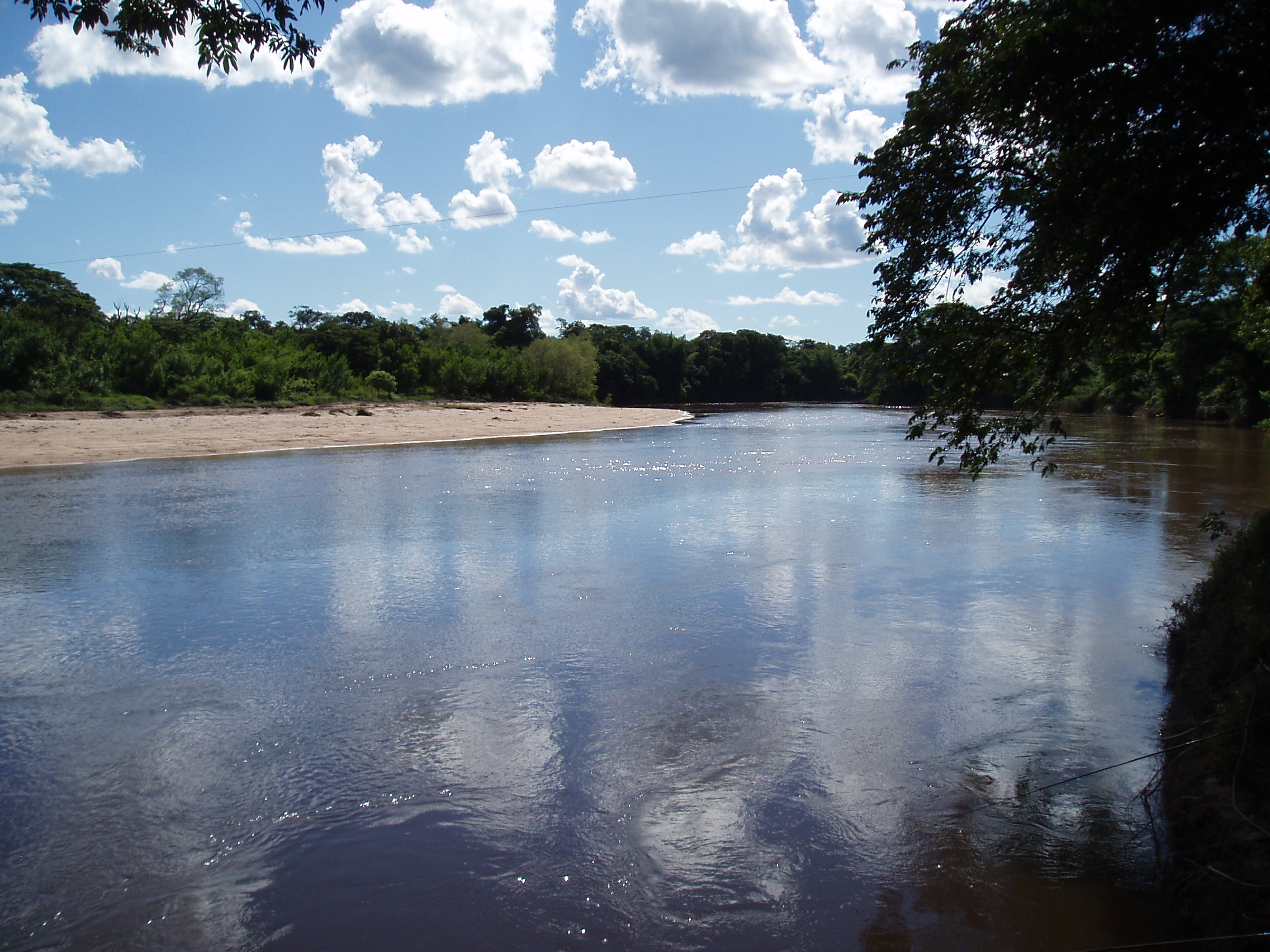
- Rio Apa

- Location of mouth in Brazil

Location
- Country: Paraguay, Brazil

Physical characteristics
- Mouth
  - location: Paraguay River
- Length: 380 km (240 mi)

The Apa River (Spanish: Río Apa, Portuguese: Rio Apa) is a river of Paraguay and Brazil. It is a tributary of the Paraguay River, which in turn is a tributary of the Paraná River. It starts in the Amambai Mountains of the Brazilian state of Mato Grosso do Sul. The Apa forms part of the border between Paraguay and Brazil beginning at the twin cities of Bella Vista Norte and Bela Vista.

Its principle tributaries flow from the right, the most notable being the Arroyo Estrella, and the Pirapucu, Caracol, and Perdido rivers which flow from the Serra da Bodoquena.

== See also ==
- List of rivers of Paraguay
