= Taquari River =

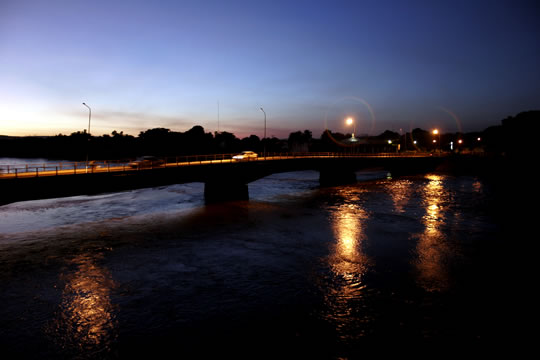

- Location within Brazil
- Native name: Rio Taquari (Portuguese)

Location
- Country: Brazil

Physical characteristics
- Mouth
  - coordinates: 19.242095°S 57.224655°W

Basin features
- River system: Paraguay River

The Taquari River (Portuguese: Rio Taquari) is a river in the states of Mato Grosso and Mato Grosso do Sul in Brazil. It is a left tributary of the Paraguay River. The town of Coxim is situated on the Taquari.

The Taquari River is considered the most degraded river in the pantanal basin of Mato Grosso do Sul. The headwaters of the river are protected by the 30,619 hectares (75,660 acres) Nascentes do Rio Taquari State Park, created in 1999.

The Taquari river complex has over recent decades been subject to various course changes and avulsions, partly through faults and crevasses in natural levees. Extensive and complex changes in water pathways have caused large scale redistribution of sediment and flooding of previously cultivated land. These processes, which are ongoing, have forced many farmers to abandon the region and hampered planning of future development over a very large area. In fact, the whole of the Pantanal wetland undergoes large changes in water flow characteristics on a range of timescales and the changes in the Taquari are part of a larger pattern of instability, which may be subject to effects of climate change.

== See also ==
- Taquari
- List of rivers of Mato Grosso do Sul
