= Miranda River =

Coordinates: 19°24′46″S 57°19′55″W

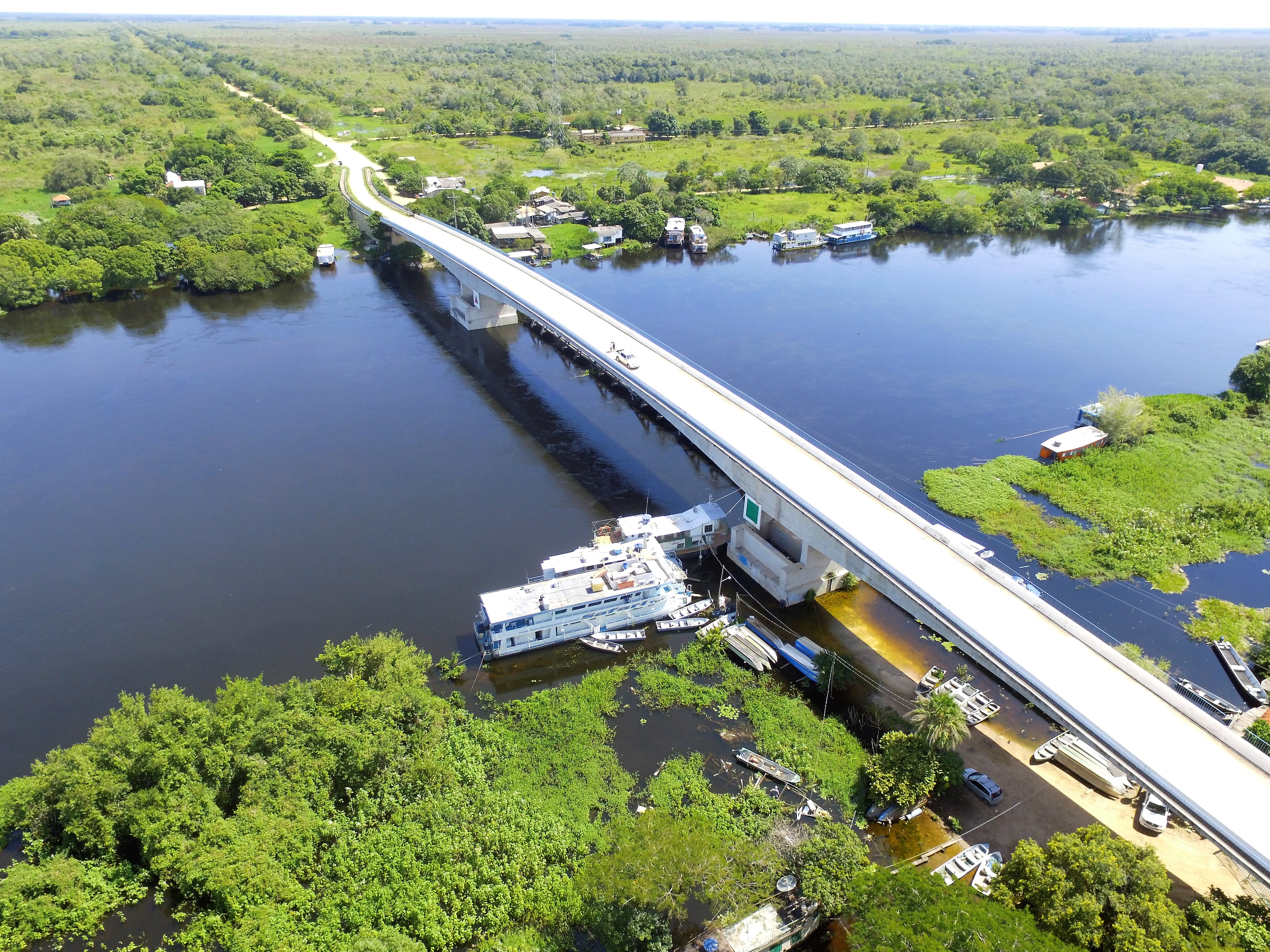
- Miranda River at Passo Lontra

Location
- Country: Brazil

Physical characteristics
- Source
  - location: Mato Grosso do Sul state
- Mouth
  - location: Paraguay River

The Miranda River (Portuguese, Rio Miranda, variant name Rio Mondego) is a river of Mato Grosso do Sul state in southwestern Brazil. It is a tributary of the Paraguay River.

== See also ==
- List of rivers of Mato Grosso do Sul
