= Ivinhema River =

Ivinhema River Rio Ivinhema (Portuguese)
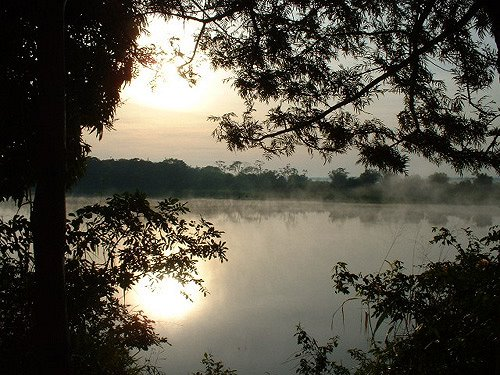

- Location within Brazil

Location
- Country: Brazil

Physical characteristics
- Source
  - location: Mato Grosso do Sul state
- Mouth: Paraná River
  - coordinates: 23°15′S 53°43′W
- Length: 595 km (370 mi)
- Basin size: 38,200 km^{2} (14,700 mi^{2})
- Discharge
  - location: mouth
  - average: 544.5 m^{3}/s (19,230 cu ft/s)

Basin features
- River system: Paraná River

The Ivinhema River (Portuguese: Rio Ivinhema) is a river of Mato Grosso do Sul state in southwestern Brazil. It is one of the main tributaries of the western part of the Paraná River.

Forty-six different species of fish were found in seven streams in the river basin. The lower reaches are protected by the 73,345 hectares (181,240 acres) Rio Ivinhema State Park, created in 1998.

== See also ==
- List of rivers of Mato Grosso do Sul
