= Ourinhos =

- Municipality
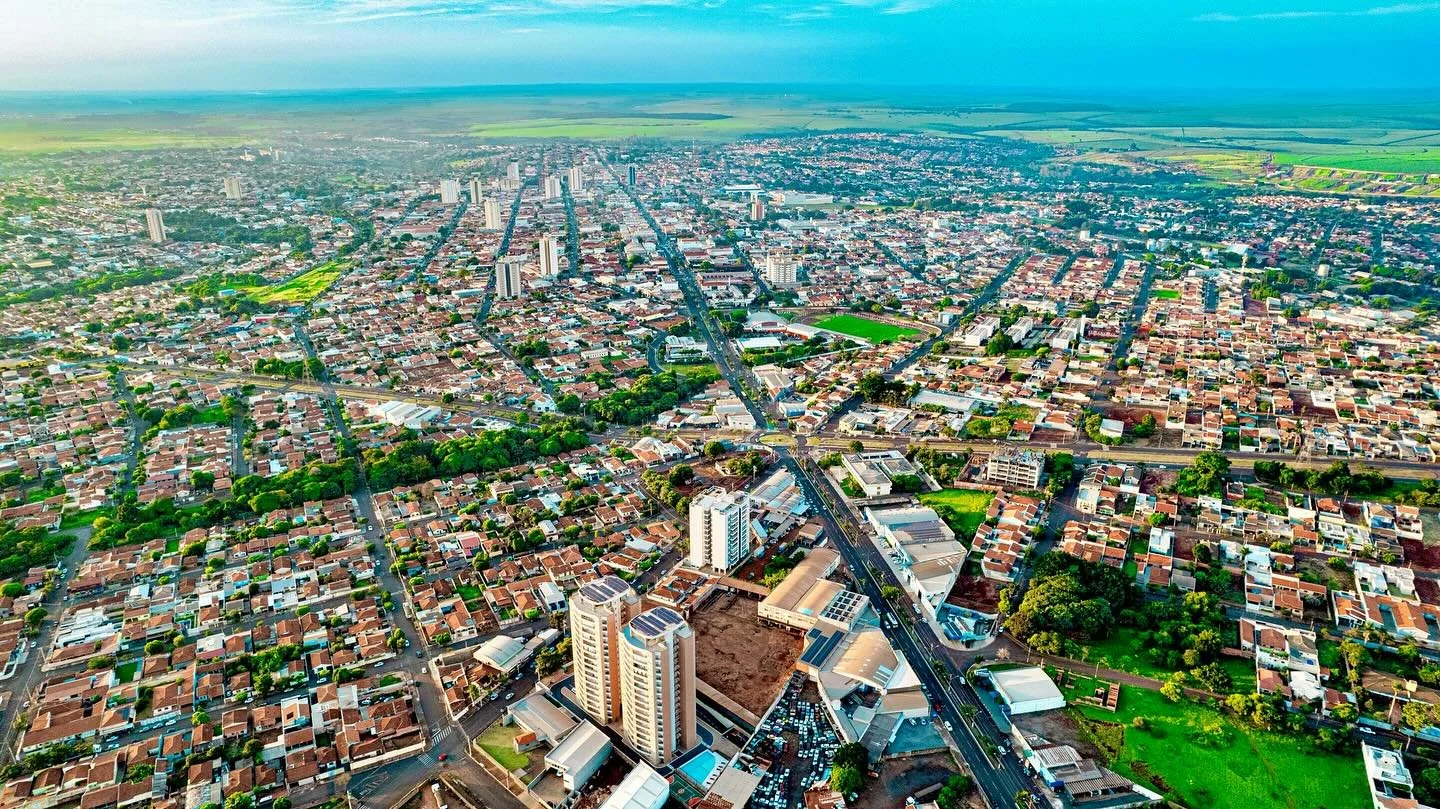
- View of the city

- Flag Coat of arms
- Motto: Terra populusque aurei "Golden land and people"
- Location in São Paulo state

- Location in Brazil
- Coordinates: 22°58′28″S 49°52′19″W
- Country: Brazil
- Region: Southeast
- State: São Paulo
- Intermediate Region: Marília
- Immediate Region: Ourinhos
- Neighboring municipalities: North: São Pedro do Turvo; South: Jacarezinho (PR); East: Santa Cruz do Rio Pardo and Canitar; West: Salto Grande
- Founded: 13 December 1918

Government
  - Mayor: Guilherme Gonçalves (PODE)
  - Term ends: 2028

Area
  - Municipality: 296.203 km^{2} (114.365 sq mi)
  - Urban (Embrapa/2015): 42.346 km^{2} (16.350 sq mi)
- Elevation: 492 m (1,614 ft)

Population (2022 Census)
  - Municipality: 103,970
  - Estimate (2025): 106,911
  - Rank: SP: 73rd
- Demonym: Ourinhense
- Climate classification: Am
- HDI (UNDP/2010): 0.778
- GDP (IBGE/2011): 1,760,987 thousand
- GDP per capita (IBGE/2011): 16975.17
- Climate: Tropical monsoon climate
- Website: www.ourinhos.sp.gov.br
- Distance from state capital: 370 km

Ourinhos is a Brazilian municipality in the interior of the state of São Paulo. Located west of the state capital, it is approximately 370 km away. Covering an area of 296 km^{2} (114 sq mi), its population according to the 2022 Brazilian census by the Brazilian Institute of Geography and Statistics (IBGE) was 103,970, making it the 76th most populous in São Paulo. It is 994 km from Brasília, the federal capital.

The municipality was emancipated from Salto Grande in the 1910s, and its name refers to the former municipality of Ourinho, now Jacarezinho, in the state of Paraná. Currently, it consists of the city of Ourinhos, with its seat being its only district, further subdivided into approximately 120 neighborhoods. It is also one of the main cities in the region, with commerce as its primary economic activity. In agriculture, the cultivation of sugarcane, soybean, and maize stands out.

The municipality also boasts a rich cultural tradition, encompassing handicrafts, theater, music, and sports. The city is notable for events often organized by the Ourinhos city hall, sometimes in partnership with local businesses. One of the main events is the Ourinhos Agricultural and Industrial Fair, held annually in June and considered one of the largest events of its kind in the country.

== History ==
=== Before emancipation ===
Until the late 19th century, the area that is now the municipality of Ourinhos was a pristine forest, inhabited by the Kaingang Indians. During this period, monocultures of coffee and cotton reached the hinterlands along the Paranapanema River, accompanied by the onset of Italian immigration, which rapidly populated the area. This led Jacinto Ferreira de Sá, originally from Santa Cruz do Rio Pardo, to acquire a vast tract of land from Escolástica Melchert da Fonseca. He subdivided the central portion and donated land for the construction of a school, an administrative headquarters, and a Methodist church.

In 1906, a small settlement with a limited number of houses began to form. In 1908, a railway post was established, which, four years later, was transformed into a railway station belonging to the Sorocaba Railway. The station served as a transfer point for passengers heading to the neighboring settlement of Ourinhos (now Jacarezinho, Paraná). From this time onward, the future city’s development was driven by the fertility of its lands and its advantageous geographical position, making it a strategic economic location due to its connection with northern Paraná and its position between Assis and Avaré, key cities in the Paranapanema Valley. The small settlement became a district under Salto Grande de Paranapanema in 1915. Three years later, it was elevated to the status of municipality on 13 December 1918, with its official establishment on 20 March 1919.

=== Administrative formation and etymology ===
It was elevated to a district under the name Ourinhos by State Law No. 1484 on 13 December 1915, belonging to the municipality of Salto Grande. It was then elevated to municipality status under the same name by Law No. 1618 on 13 December 1918, separated from Salto Grande. It consisted of the seat district, with its establishment occurring on 20 March 1919. By State Decree-Law No. 9073 of 31 March 1938, the Municipality of Ourinhos was part of the sub-district of Salto Grande, within the Salto Grande judicial district. Under the framework established by State Decree No. 9775 of 30 November of the same year, it became the sole sub-district of the Ourinhos judicial district.

The name "Ourinhos" was used even before its political emancipation. A 1908 map shows a city named Ourinho (singular) in Paraná, where Jacarezinho now stands. In fact, the Paraná Ourinho was also called Nova Alcântara, chosen by its founder, Antônio Alcântara da Fonseca, a miner who settled there in 1888. State Law No. 352 of 2 April 1900 established that Nova Alcântara (or Ourinho) and the Jacarezinho police district be incorporated into the Jacarezinho sub-district, with the appointment of a judge and deputy prosecutor. Law No. 525 of 9 March 1904 created the Jacarezinho judicial district, effectively dissolving the Paraná Ourinho, though maps continued to use the old name for some time. The Sorocaba Railway formalized the São Paulo Ourinhos, which inherited the name through oral tradition. Thus, Ourinhos was already referred to by this name regionally, as Ourinho was sometimes called Nova Alcântara, causing confusion among residents who often referred to the current Ourinhos even before its official designation. Like many Brazilian cities, Ourinhos was already a city in practice before its official political emancipation.

=== After emancipation ===
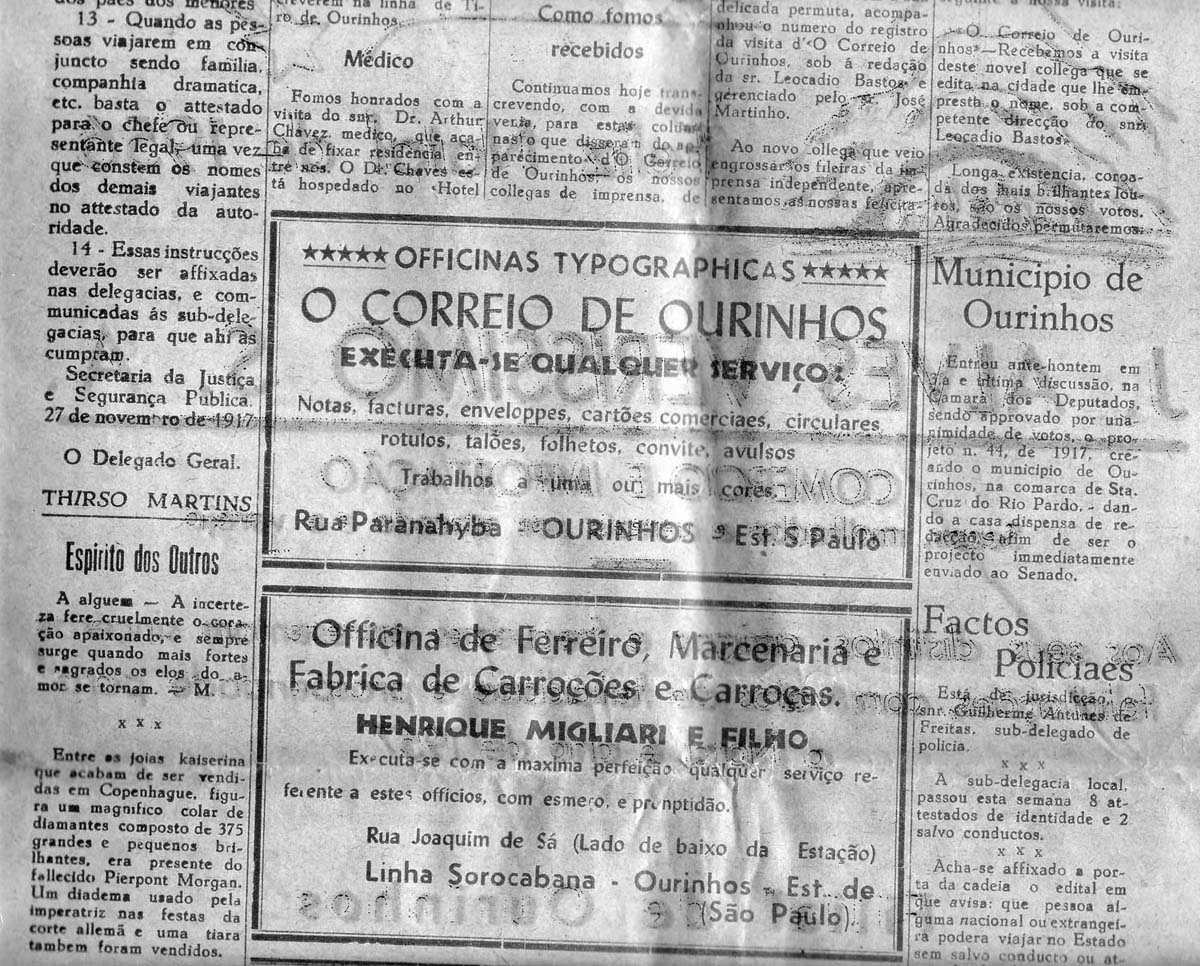
Image of one of the first publications of the Correio de Ourinhos.

With the resumption of the railway and deforestation, fertile lands facilitated coffee cultivation for export, which was highly profitable for landowners at the time. Concurrently, merchants and professionals from various regions arrived, contributing to the municipality’s growth and development. During this period, immigrants from Japan, Italy, and other countries were attracted to Ourinhos, primarily to cultivate lands along the railway. Another railway, the São Paulo-Paraná Railway, built in 1922, connected São Paulo and Paraná, making Ourinhos a significant economic hub and junction.

The city’s urban development required improvements in urban infrastructure. In the 1910s, the first newspaper was published. The Ourinhos Water and Sewage Superintendency (SAE) was established by Law No. 808 on 13 April 1967, during the administration of Mayor Domingos Camerlingo Caló.

Due to the growth of Ourinhos and neighboring cities, the Ourinhos Microregion was created, encompassing Ourinhos and 18 other municipalities, including Santa Cruz do Rio Pardo, Piraju, Fartura, Ipaussu, Chavantes, Taguaí, Bernardino de Campos, Manduri, Salto Grande, São Pedro do Turvo, Tejupá, and Ribeirão do Sul. In 2006, its population was estimated by the Brazilian Institute of Geography and Statistics at approximately 294,902 inhabitants across a total area of 5,568.472 km². Its average HDI was 0.792, and the average GDP per capita was R$9,501.74 in 2003. It is located in the Assis Mesoregion.

== Demographics ==
Historical population
Year	Pop.	±%
1920	4,273	—
1925	6,390	+49.5%
1934	7,724	+20.9%
1937	8,257	+6.9%
1940	13,123	+58.9%
1946	16,104	+22.7%
1950	21,085	+30.9%
1958	29,830	+41.5%
1960	34,293	+15.0%
1970	49,221	+43.5%
1980	59,738	+21.4%
1991	76,923	+28.8%
2000	93,868	+22.0%
2010	103,035	+9.8%
2022	103,970	+0.9%
2024 (est.)	106,877	+2.8%
Source: IBGE Demographic Censuses and SEADE Estimates

In the 2022 census conducted by the Brazilian Institute of Geography and Statistics (IBGE), the population of the municipality was 103,970 inhabitants, with a population density of 351.47 inhabitants/km².

In the 2010 census, the population was recorded by the Brazilian Institute of Geography and Statistics (IBGE) as 103,026 inhabitants. According to that census, 49,972 inhabitants were men, and 53,054 were women. Additionally, 100,368 inhabitants lived in the urban area, and 2,658 in the rural area. According to statistics released in 2013, the municipal population was 108,674 inhabitants, making it the 73rd most populous in the state. Of the total population in 2010, 21,941 inhabitants (21.29%) were under 15 years old, 71,779 inhabitants (69.66%) were aged 15 to 64, and 9,315 people (9.04%) were over 65. The life expectancy at birth was 76.5 years, and the total fertility rate per woman was 1.7.

The Municipal Human Development Index (HDI-M) of Ourinhos is considered high by the United Nations Development Programme (UNDP), with a value of 0.778 (the 145th highest in Brazil). The city has most indicators close to the national average according to the UNDP. The education index is 0.727, the longevity index is 0.859, and the income index is 0.753.

=== Poverty and inequality ===
According to the IBGE, in 2003, the Gini coefficient, which measures social inequality, was 0.46, where 1.00 is the worst and 0.00 is the best. The incidence of poverty, as measured by the IBGE, was 14.92%, with the lower poverty threshold at 14.56%, the upper at 14.92%, and subjective poverty at 18.12%.

According to IBGE data published by the Ministry of Social Development, Ourinhos has 1,256 families below the poverty line, or 3,768 people (3.65% of the population). In March 2013, the municipality had 2,426 families enrolled in the Bolsa Família Program, representing 65.89% of the estimated total families eligible for the program (65.89% coverage). Of the Bolsa Família beneficiaries, 6,986 people lived in families with a per capita income below R$70.00 and would be in extreme poverty without the program’s benefits.

=== Religion ===
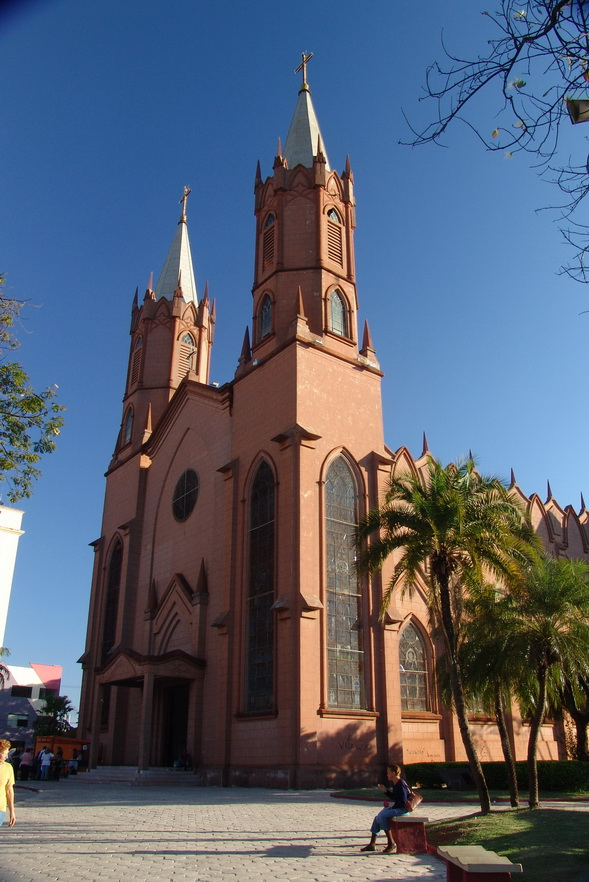
Cathedral of Senhor Bom Jesus, seat of the Diocese of Ourinhos.

Reflecting the cultural diversity in Ourinhos, the city is home to a variety of religious traditions. While it developed on a predominantly Catholic social foundation, dozens of different Protestant denominations can now be found. The growth of evangelicals has also been notable, reaching nearly 26.00% of the population.

According to the 2010 census conducted by the Brazilian Institute of Geography and Statistics, the population of Ourinhos consists of: Catholics (67.57%), evangelicals (25.56%), people with no religion (3.76%), Spiritists (1.02%), and 2.16% divided among other religions.

Christianity is present in the city as follows:

==== Catholic Church ====
Ourinhos is located in the country with the largest Catholic population in absolute numbers. The Catholic Church had its legal status recognized by the federal government in October 2009, although Brazil is currently an officially secular state. The city is the seat of the Diocese of Ourinhos.

==== Evangelical churches ====
The city is home to a variety of Protestant or reformed denominations, such as:

- Assembly of God.
- Christian Congregation in Brazil.
- Foursquare Church.

== Geography ==
According to the regional division in effect since 2017, established by the IBGE, Ourinhos belongs to the homonymous immediate geographic region and the Marília intermediate region. Previously, under the division into microregions and mesoregions, it was part of the Ourinhos microregion, which was included in the Assis mesoregion. It borders the municipalities of São Pedro do Turvo to the north; Jacarezinho, in the state of Paraná, to the south; Santa Cruz do Rio Pardo and Canitar to the east; and Salto Grande to the west. It is intersected east-west by the parallel 49° 52' 15" and north-south by the meridian 22° 58' 44". The municipality’s area is 296.203 square kilometers (km²), representing 0.12% of the São Paulo territory, 0.03% of the Southeast region, and 0.004% of the entire Brazilian territory. The urban perimeter area is 42.346 km² (2015).

Ourinhos is located within the Paraná River hydrographic basin, at an average altitude of 492 meters, with several sub-basins of small and medium streams playing significant roles in its configuration. Its main rivers are the Paranapanema, Pardo, and Turvo, all of which flow through the city’s urban perimeter. The topography is slightly rugged but predominantly flat.

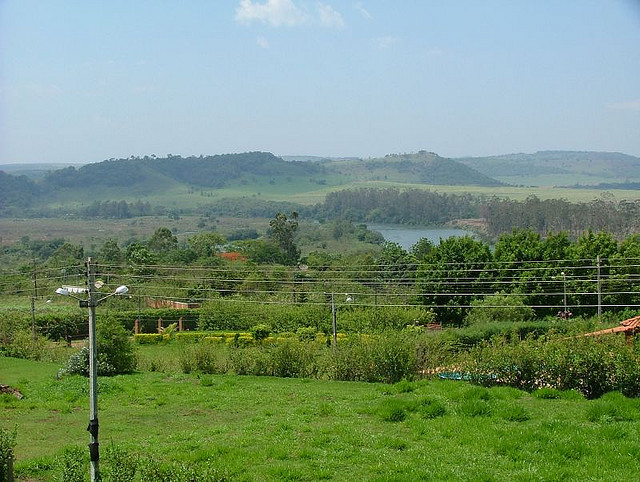
Forested areas amidst pasture in the rural area

The native vegetation of the municipality belongs to the Atlantic Forest domain, featuring a variety of fauna and flora species. One of the city’s main environmental reserves is the Biologist Tânia Mara Netto Silva Ecological Park, preserving the last stretch of native Atlantic Forest in the municipality, covering about 122,000 m² of wildlife and native plants.

This park also plays a significant role in municipal tourism, hosting activities such as trail walks, meditation, and various sports. To preserve local fauna and flora and improve air quality in various neighborhoods, tree-planting initiatives are carried out across the municipality, using native species such as aroeira, myrcia oblongata, ipê, and pitanga.

=== Climate ===
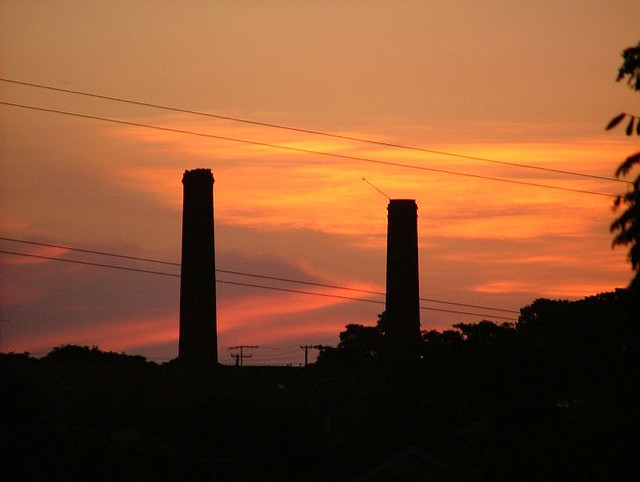
Sunset in Ourinhos

According to a study by the State University of Campinas (UNICAMP), Ourinhos has a tropical savanna climate (type Am in the Köppen climate classification), with an average temperature above 18 °C in the coldest month and precipitation below 60 millimeters (mm) in the driest month. During the summer months, convective rains are frequent, helping to mitigate significant thermal and humidity contrasts compared to days without precipitation. The annual pluviometric index is approximately 1,300 mm, with a notable decrease during the winter.

According to data from the Integrated Center for Agrometeorological Information (CIIAGRO-SP), since May 2000, the lowest temperature recorded in Ourinhos was −2.5 °C in July 2000, on the 16th and 21st. Sub-zero temperatures were also recorded on 28 June 2011 (−1.8 °C) and 17 July 2000 (−1 °C). The highest temperature reached 42.3 °C on 7 October 2020. The highest 24-hour rainfall accumulation was 171.5 mm on 20 June 201 Odysseys, followed by 120 mm on 15 December 2002 and 105.2 mm on 11 January 2009.

Climate data for Ourinhos, elevation 450 m (1,480 ft), (2000–2020 normals, extremes 2000–2022)
Month	Jan	Feb	Mar	Apr	May	Jun	Jul	Aug	Sep	Oct	Nov	Dec	Year
Record high °C (°F)	39.5 (103.1)	40.0 (104.0)	40.0 (104.0)	39.5 (103.1)	36.0 (96.8)	36.0 (96.8)	35.0 (95.0)	37.7 (99.9)	40.5 (104.9)	42.3 (108.1)	41.0 (105.8)	40.0 (104.0)	42.3 (108.1)
Mean daily maximum °C (°F)	31.7 (89.1)	32.1 (89.8)	31.8 (89.2)	30.6 (87.1)	26.8 (80.2)	26.1 (79.0)	26.3 (79.3)	28.5 (83.3)	30.3 (86.5)	31.1 (88.0)	31.4 (88.5)	31.9 (89.4)	29.9 (85.8)
Daily mean °C (°F)	25.8 (78.4)	25.9 (78.6)	25.4 (77.7)	23.9 (75.0)	20.0 (68.0)	18.9 (66.0)	18.7 (65.7)	20.4 (68.7)	22.6 (72.7)	24.3 (75.7)	24.8 (76.6)	25.7 (78.3)	23.0 (73.5)
Mean daily minimum °C (°F)	20.0 (68.0)	19.8 (67.6)	19.1 (66.4)	17.1 (62.8)	13.1 (55.6)	11.8 (53.2)	11.1 (52.0)	12.2 (54.0)	14.9 (58.8)	17.5 (63.5)	18.3 (64.9)	19.5 (67.1)	16.2 (61.2)
Record low °C (°F)	13.0 (55.4)	14.0 (57.2)	14.1 (57.4)	7.2 (45.0)	3.0 (37.4)	−1.8 (28.8)	−2.5 (27.5)	0.4 (32.7)	1.0 (33.8)	8.9 (48.0)	12.0 (53.6)	11.0 (51.8)	−2.5 (27.5)
Average precipitation mm (inches)	239.5 (9.43)	124.7 (4.91)	129.0 (5.08)	80.7 (3.18)	92.1 (3.63)	65.2 (2.57)	48.1 (1.89)	45.8 (1.80)	75.8 (2.98)	119.9 (4.72)	115.6 (4.55)	171.1 (6.74)	1,307.5 (51.48)
Average precipitation days (≥ 1.0 mm)	16.3	12.4	10.8	7.1	7.4	6.8	4.7	4.9	7.6	10.0	9.6	12.0	109.6
Source: Centro Integrado de Informações Agrometeorológicas

=== Subdivisions ===
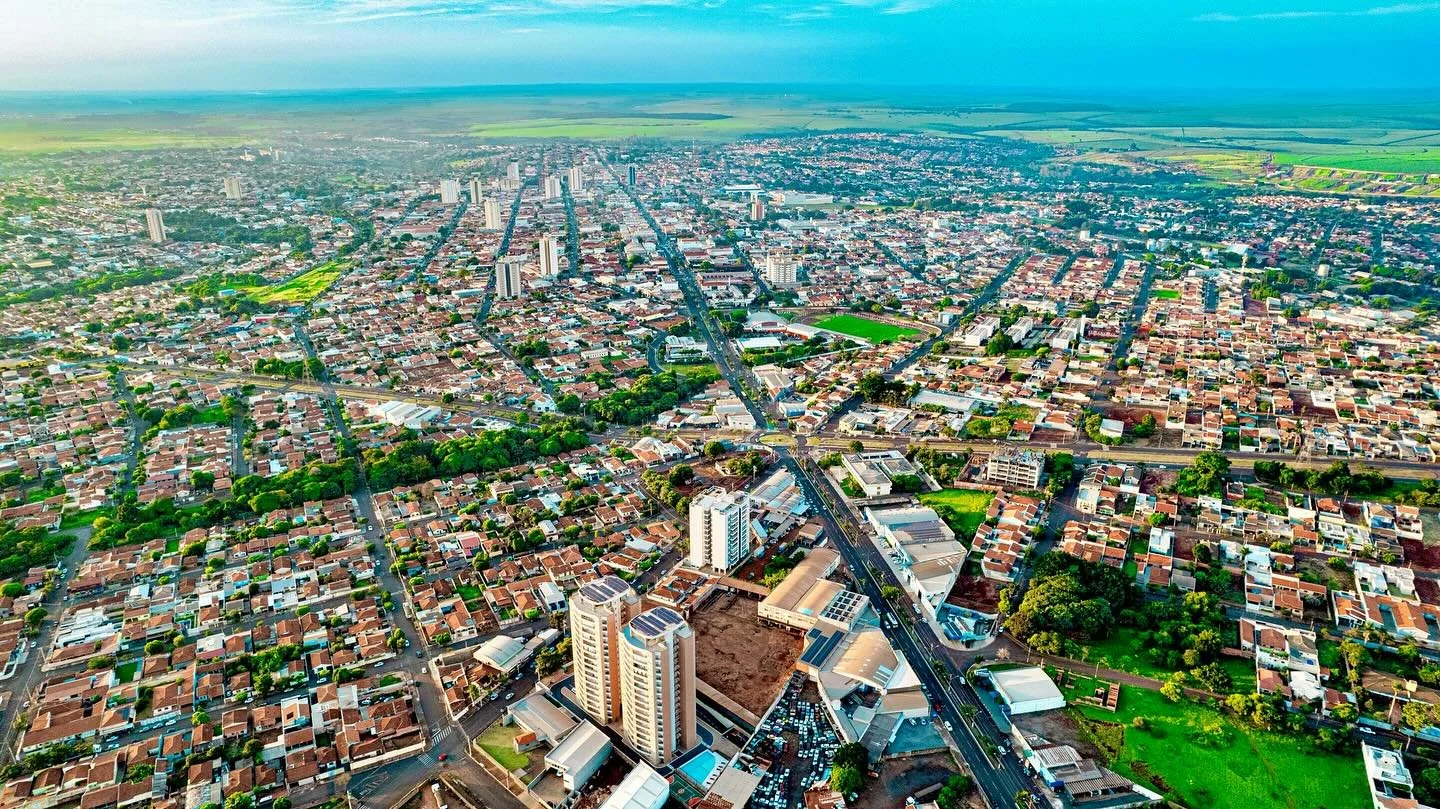
Aerial view of Ourinhos

Ourinhos is officially subdivided into a single district, the Seat, established on 20 March 1919. This subdivision has existed since the city’s political emancipation. By State Decree-Law No. 9073 of 31 March 1938, the Municipality of Ourinhos was part of the Salto Grande sub-district, within the Salto Grande judicial district. Under the framework established by State Decree No. 9775 of 30 November of the same year, it became the sole sub-district of the Ourinhos judicial district. The city is also divided into approximately 120 neighborhoods.

== Politics and administration ==
Municipal administration is carried out by the executive power and the legislative power. Currently, Lucas Pocay Alves da Silva, from the Social Democratic Party (PSD), is the mayor and representative of the executive, having won the 2016 municipal elections with 62.34% of the vote.

The legislative power is constituted by the municipal chamber, composed of fifteen councilors elected for four-year terms (in accordance with Article 29 of the Constitution) and is composed as follows: two seats for the Brazilian Democratic Movement Party (PMDB), two seats for the Brazilian Labour Party (PTB), two seats for the Brazilian Social Democracy Party (PSDB), two seats for the Workers' Party (PT), one seat for the Christian Social Democratic Party (PSDC), one seat for the Brazilian Republican Party (PRB), and one for the Party of the Republic (PR). The chamber is responsible for drafting and voting on fundamental laws for the administration and the executive, particularly the participatory budget (Budget Guidelines Law).

The municipality is governed by an organic law and is the seat of the Ourinhos Judicial District. It had 76,057 voters in June 2012, representing 0.241% of the total in the state of São Paulo.

=== List of mayors ===
The following is a list of individuals who have served as mayor of Ourinhos:

- Eduardo Salgueiro - 1919 to 1921
- Benicio do Espírito Santo - 1921 to 1923
- Jacintho Ferreira de Sá - 1923 to 1925
- José Felipe do Amaral - 1925 to 1926
- José Esteves Mano Filho - 1926 to 1926
- José Galvão - 1926 to 1930
- Dr. Hermelino Agnes de Leão - 1930 to 1930
- Rodopiano Leonis Pereira - 1931
- Theodureto Ferreira Gomes - 1931 to 1931
- José Felipe do Amaral - 1931 to 1933
- Mario Grandi - 1933 to 1933
- Benedito Martins de Camargo - 1934 to 1937
- José Esteves Mano Filho - 1937 to 1938
- Horácio Soares - 1938 to 1941
- José Felipe do Amaral - 1941 to 1941
- Dr. Hermelino Agnes de Leão - 1941 to 1944
- Adail Faria da Cunha - 1944 to 1945
- Dr. Hermelino Agnes de Leão - 1945 to 1945
- Dr. Antonio Rocha Paes - 1945 to 1945
- Mario Campos Pacheco - 1945 to 1946
- Alberto Bráz - 1946 to 1947
- Olímpio Coelho Tupiná - 1947
- Adail Faria da Cunha - 1947 to 1948
- Candido Barbosa Filho - 1948 to 1951
- Domingos Camerlingo Caló - 1952 to 1955
- José Maria Paschoalik - 1956 to 1958
- José del Ciel Filho - 1958
- José Maria Paschoalik - 1958 to 1959
- Antõnio Luiz Ferreira - 1960 to 1963
- Domingos Camerlingo Caló - 1964 to 1968
- Dr. João Milton César - 1968
- Domingos Camerlingo Caló - 1968 to 1969
- Dr. Lauro Migliari - 1969
- Mithuo Minami - 1969 to 1973
- Prof. Rubens Bortolocci - 1973 to 1977
- Aldo Matachana - 1977 to 1983
- Espiridião Cury - 1983 to 1988
- Dr. Clóvis Chiaradia - 1989 to 1992
- Claury Santos Alves da Silva - 1993 to 1996
- Toshio Missato - 1997 to 2000
- Claudemir Ozório Alves da Silva - 2001 to 2004
- Toshio Missato - 2005 to 2008 / 2009 to 2012
- Belkis Gonçalves Santos Fernandes - 2013 to 2016
- Lucas Pocay Alves da Silva - 2017 to 2020 / Current mayor, re-elected in 2020

== Infrastructure ==
In 2000, Ourinhos had 26,536 housing units including apartments, houses, and rooms. Of these, 18,308 were owned properties, with 14,311 fully paid (53.93%), 3,997 under acquisition (15.06%), 4,989 rented (18.80%); 3,158 properties were provided, with 1,202 by employers (4.53%) and 1,956 provided otherwise (7.37%). 81 were occupied in other ways (0.31%). The municipality has treated water, electricity, sewage, urban cleaning, fixed telephony, and mobile telephony. In 2000, 96.83% of households were served by the general water supply network; 95.84% of homes had waste collection; and 94.19% of residences had sanitary drainage.

=== Healthcare ===
In 2005, the municipality had 63 health facilities, 42 private and 21 public, including hospitals, emergency departments, health centers, and dental services. The city has 357 hospitalization beds, all private. There are three general hospitals, two private and one philanthropic. Ourinhos also has 311 nursing assistants, 187 dental surgeons, 168 general practitioners, 71 nurses, and 1,012 in other categories, totaling 1,837 health professionals. In 2007, the birth rate was 13.11%, and 6.76% of babies were born underweight. Cesarean births accounted for 55.74% of all births, and 6.81% of these births were to mothers aged 10 to 18.

Services under the Municipal Health Department include: the Central Sterilization Unit; the Central Medicine Dispensary; the Specialty Drug Dispensary (High-Cost Medications); the Mental Health and HIV/AIDS Medicine Dispensary; the Municipal Compounding Pharmacy; and Health Service Waste Management. Hospital services affiliated with the Unified Health System (SUS) include the Ourinhos Holy House of Mercy and the Ourinhos Mental Health Hospital. The city also has four municipal ambulances, two private mobile ICU ambulances, two basic transport ambulances (Holy House of Mercy/Mental Health Hospital), and one rescue unit from the São Paulo Military Police Fire Department.

=== Education ===
Education in Ourinhos by numbers
Level	Enrollments	Teachers	Schools (total)
Early childhood education	2,614	150	34
Primary education	14,854	803	35
Secondary education	4,347	326	18

Ourinhos has schools in all regions of the municipality. Due to extensive urbanization, the few rural area residents have easy access to schools in nearby urban neighborhoods. Education in state schools is slightly superior to municipal schools, but the city hall is conducting studies to improve public municipal education to achieve better results in the Basic Education Development Index. In 2008, the municipality had approximately 21,815 enrollments, 971 teachers, and 87 schools in public and private networks.

The city hall, through its Education Department in partnership with various public and private entities, promotes activities and programs to enhance educational quality, such as the Literacy Teacher Training Program (PROFA/CENP); Math Literacy Program (MEC/UNDIME); Elementary Education Reference Center (CREF)/São Paulo State University (UNESP); Read and Write (CENP); National Fiscal Education Program; Distance Training for School Managers – PROGESTÃO (UNDIME and CONSED, with cooperation from the Roberto Marinho Foundation); Training Course for Managers and Educators, Inclusive Education: Right to Diversity (MEC/Ourinhos SME); Drug Abuse Resistance Education (PROERD) in partnership with the São Paulo Military Police; Specialized Educational Care Training Course in partnership with MEC/Federal University of Ceará (UFCe); School Managers Program, Postgraduate Program in School Management, in partnership with MEC/Federal University of São Carlos (UFSCAR); and Robotics Education Training (LEGO Education). Ourinhos's education system is considered noteworthy.

=== Services and communications ===
The sewage collection and water supply services for the entire city are managed by the Ourinhos Water and Sewage Superintendency (Sae-Ourinhos). Much of the water consumed in the municipality comes from the Pardo River and small underground reservoirs and springs. 100% of the city is served by the electricity distribution network, supplied by the Companhia Paulista de Força e Luz (CPFL), headquartered in Campinas.

The automatic telephone system was introduced in the city in 1964 by the Ourinhos Telephone Company. The direct distance dialing (DDD) system was implemented in 1978 by Telecomunicações de São Paulo (TELESP) with the area code (0143). In the 1990s, the city’s DDD code was changed to (014) to standardize the telephone system with the mobile telephony being implemented across the state.

Mobile telephone services are provided by various operators. 3G access has been available in the municipality since 2009. The area code (DDD) for Ourinhos is 014, and the postal code (CEP) ranges from 19900-000 to 19919-999. On 1 September 2008, the municipality began to be served by number portability, along with other cities in São Paulo (codes 14 and 17), Espírito Santo (27), Minas Gerais (37), Paraná (43), Goiás (62), Mato Grosso do Sul (67), and Piauí (86). There are also dial-up internet, broadband (ADSL), wireless internet, and fiber optic services, offered by various free and paid Internet service providers.

The municipality also has various newspapers. The main ones are Jornal de Ourinhos, Jornal da Divisa, and Diário de Ourinhos. There are also radio stations, including Rádio de Ourinhos, Divisa FM 93.3, Itaipu FM 92.5, Rádio Clube de Ourinhos, and Rádio Sentinela de Ourinhos.

=== Transportation ===
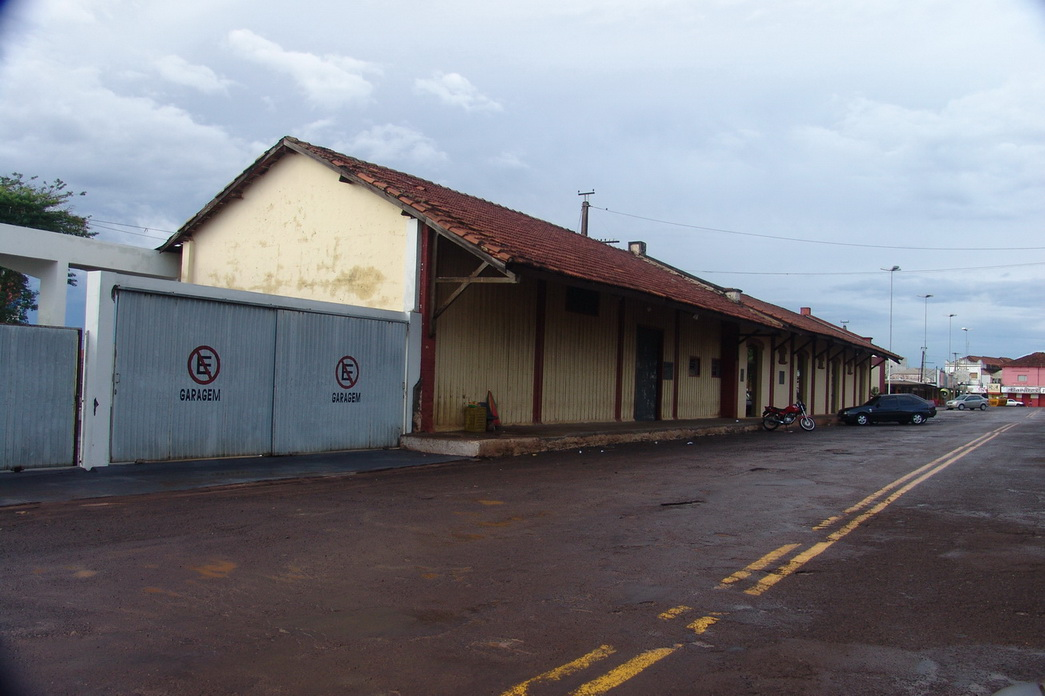
Ourinhos railway station, part of the Sorocaba Railway, deactivated since 1999.

Ourinhos is served by the Trunk Line of the former Sorocaba Railway, currently concessioned to Rumo Logística, with the Ourinhos Railway Station, inaugurated in late 1908. However, the railway and station ceased passenger services on 16 January 1999, remaining active only for tourist trips on a steam locomotive between Rubião Júnior (a district of Botucatu) and Presidente Epitácio. Ourinhos also has a railway junction between the Sorocaba line and the Cianorte Branch of the former São Paulo-Paraná Railway Company, also under Rumo’s concession. Passenger transport on this latter railway ceased in 1981, with only freight trains remaining. The municipality is crossed by the Raposo Tavares Highway (SP-270), connecting São Paulo to the border with Mato Grosso do Sul; SP-278 - Mello Peixoto State Highway - linking Ourinhos to nearby cities; SP-327 - Orlando Quagliato Highway - connecting the city to Santa Cruz do Rio Pardo; BR-153 - Transbrasiliana Highway - linking the municipality to various cities across the country (a highway stretching from Aceguá, Rio Grande do Sul, to Marabá, Pará). Additionally, it has access to regionally and nationally significant highways through paved, double-lane secondary roads. The city also has the Ourinhos State Airport (IATA: OUS, ICAO: SDOU), with a capacity for about 3,000 passengers.

The municipal fleet in 2018 consisted of 75,639 vehicles, including 39,027 cars, 2,250 trucks, 2,357 pickups, 652 buses, 16,762 motorcycles, and 5,351 mopeds. Between 2001 and 2010, a 78.5% increase in the number of vehicles was recorded, considered concerning by the municipal Traffic and Transport Coordination. Divided and paved avenues and numerous traffic lights facilitate city traffic, but the growth in vehicle numbers over the past decade has led to increasingly slow traffic, especially in the municipal seat. Additionally, finding parking spaces in the commercial center has become challenging, causing some losses to commerce.

Public transportation in Ourinhos is currently operated by Auto Viação Ourinhos Assis (Avoa), which has been responsible for the service since 1978. There are 22 urban lines available, with a fare of R$2.50, and discounts for students and people aged 60 to 65.

== Economy ==
The Gross Domestic Product (GDP) of Ourinhos is the largest in the Ourinhos Microregion and the 308th in the country. According to 2011 IBGE data, the municipality’s GDP was R$1,760,987 thousand. 102,147 thousand were from taxes on products net of subsidies at current prices, and the GDP per capita was R$16,975.17.

=== Primary sector ===
Production of sugarcane, soybean, and maize (2007)
Product	Harvested area (hectares)	Production (tons)
Sugarcane	16,500	1,650,000
Soybean	3,000	9,600
Maize	1,720	6,180

Agriculture is the least significant sector of Ourinhos’ economy. Of the total GDP, 42,279 thousand reais is the gross added value of agriculture. According to the IBGE, in 2008, the municipality had a herd of 3,905 cattle, 400 equines, 1,964 pigs, 113 goats, 383 buffaloes, seven donkeys, 24 mules, 943 sheep, and 1,104,355 poultry, including 479,669 hens and 624,686 roosters, broilers, and chicks. In 2007, the city produced 630,000 liters of milk from 1,086 cows. It produced 9,114 thousand dozen eggs and 60 kilograms of honey. In temporary agriculture, the main crops are sugarcane (1,650,000 tons), soybean (9,000 tons), and maize (6,180 tons). In 2006, there were 133 agricultural establishments covering a total of 5,796 hectares.

=== Secondary sector ===
The industry is currently the second most relevant sector for Ourinhos’ economy. 340,980 reais of the municipal GDP comes from the gross added value of the industrial sector.

=== Tertiary sector ===
1,206,435 thousand reais of the municipal GDP comes from the tertiary sector, which in 2011 was the largest contributor to Ourinhos’ GDP. According to the IBGE, in 2008, the city had 3,511 companies and commercial establishments and 41,703 workers, employing a total of 22,985 people and 18,718 salaried employees. Wages and other remunerations totaled 260,212 reais, with an average monthly salary of 2.6 minimum wages. There are also 13 financial agencies in the city. As in the rest of the country, the peak sales period in the municipality is Christmas.

== Culture and leisure ==
=== Arts and crafts ===
Within the domain of performing arts, several structures are dedicated to municipal culture, such as the Miguel Cury Municipal Theater, the Historical and Pedagogical Municipal Museum, the Popular Art Center, and the 'Para Ler o Mundo' Cultural Center, part of the Tristão de Athayde Municipal Library.

Handicrafts are one of the most prominent forms of cultural expression in Ourinhos. Throughout the municipality, unique artisanal production is found, made with regional raw materials and created according to local culture and lifestyle. The Superintendence of Handicraft Work in Communities (SUTACO) brings together various regional artisans, providing space for production, exhibition, and sale of artisanal products. Items such as crocheted quilts and table runners, flowers made from dried corn husks, and pieces produced on looms are commonly made. These items are typically sold at fairs, exhibitions, or shops specializing in handicrafts.

=== Events ===
To promote local socioeconomic development, the Ourinhos city government, sometimes in collaboration with local companies, invests in the organization of fests and events. These celebrations often attract visitors from other cities, necessitating improved infrastructure in the municipality and fostering the professionalization of the sector, which benefits not only tourists but also the entire local population. These activities take place throughout the year.

The Ourinhos Agricultural and Industrial Fair is one of the main events held in the municipality. Since its inception in 1967, it has been held annually in May or June, drawing visitors from the surrounding region. It is also recognized as one of the largest fairs in the country, offering free admission. The event is currently hosted at the Olavo Ferreira de Sá Exhibition Grounds. In recent years, each fair has featured an average of 260 exhibitors from the commerce and industry sectors and 350 from the livestock sector, with the latter including over 1,600 animals. During the eleven-day event, free artistic performances draw thousands of people to the fairgrounds.

Another significant event is the music festival held annually in the city during the month of July, which has gained prominence for featuring musicians from across the country, elevating the city's reputation both nationally and internationally. The event includes workshops led by renowned musicians, contributing to the development of the city's cultural scene. Notable artists such as Toninho Horta, Nélson Ayres, and others have participated in the event as guest performers or workshop instructors.

=== Sports ===
As in most Brazilian cities, the most popular and widely practiced sport in the municipality is football. The sport has been played in Ourinhos since 1908, during the construction of the small railway station on land owned by Dona Escolástica, when workers, during their free time, played football matches in the area now known as Melo Peixoto Square. On 5 June 1919, a group of residents founded the Clube Atlético Ourinhense. On 27 June 1920, the working-class community established the now-defunct Esporte Clube Operário. With the establishment of the city government, its employees also founded another football club, Municipal A.C. Another club, Aurora F.C., emerged in the 1920s, with its field located among the coffee plantations of the former Sá farm. In 1932, Aurora F.C. ceased to exist, and its field was acquired by Operário, which by then also maintained a recreational center.

Ourinhos also stands out nationally in women's basketball, boasting one of the best teams in the world. The team was established in 1995 with support from the municipal government. Subsequently, it received funding and sponsorship from local private companies and other collaborators. From 1995 to August 2009, the team won the national championship five times (2004, 2005, 2006, 2007, and 2008), the São Paulo state championship six times (2000, 2002, 2004, 2005, 2006, and 2007), and the South American Club Championship (2008), among other titles. The municipality is known as the "National Capital of Women's Basketball" and serves as a hub for the national basketball team.

=== Holidays ===
Ourinhos observes two municipal holidays, eight national holidays, and three optional holidays. The municipal holidays are the day of the patron saint Good Lord Jesus, on 6 August, and the city's anniversary, on 13 December. According to Federal Law No. 9,093 of 12 September 1995, municipalities may have a maximum of four municipal holidays, including Good Friday.

== See also ==
- List of municipalities in São Paulo
- Interior of São Paulo
