= Chavantes =

- Municipality
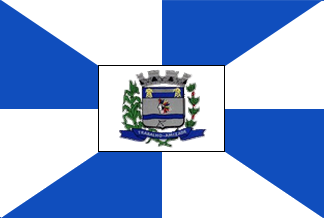
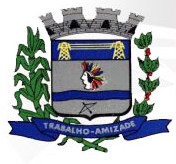
- Flag Coat of arms

- Location in São Paulo state

- Location in Brazil
- Coordinates: 23°2′20″S 49°42′34″W
- Country: Brazil
- Region: Southeast
- State: São Paulo

Area
  - Total: 188.7 km^{2} (72.9 sq mi)

Population (2020)
  - Total: 12,418
  - Density: 65.81/km^{2} (170.4/sq mi)
- Time zone: UTC−3 (BRT)

Chavantes is a municipality in the state of São Paulo in Brazil. The population is 12,418 (2020 est.) in an area of 188.7 square kilometres (72.9 sq mi). The elevation is 563 metres (1,847 ft).

== Geography ==
Chavantes is a city in the southwestern part of the state of São Paulo, Brazil, that borders the city of Santa Cruz do Rio Pardo to the north; Timburi and Ribeirão Claro in the state of Paraná to the south, which is separated from São Paulo state by the Paranapanema River; Ipaussu to the east: and Canitar, which previously belonged to its municipality; and Ourinhos the seat of its comarca to the west.

== Name and history ==
The town was established as the district of Irapé within the municipality of Santa Cruz do Rio Pardo in 1909. In 1917 its name was changed into Xavantes, after a nearby railway station, which in turn was named after the Native American Xavante tribe. In 1923 it became an independent municipality. The name spelling was changed into Chavantes in 1982.

The railway was soon transferred further northwest with connections with Ourinhos, which despite being founded later than Chavantes, became more prominent, perhaps due to its strategic situation closer to the great Northern Paraná coffee farms. Chavantes became officially autonomous on December 4, 1922, but its exploration history goes back to the 1870s and probably before that, with the Portuguese Bandeiras settling campaigns that sought to expand Portuguese lands beyond the Tordesilhas Treaty landmark with Spanish America, while attempting to enslave the Natives in a colonialist search for precious stones. Large family of farmers eventually settled in the area, destroying entire forests to open way for farming. Today an important state road named after Raposo Tavares, a Bandeirante, passes near the town. The Bandeirantes did not find the treasures they coveted, but the region's red soil was proved to be amongst the most fertile in the world and the subtropical to temperate weather just right for any type of plantation.

With the advent of coffee, São Paulo soon became a major producer and its main crop was named "Ouro Verde" (lit. "green gold"). As a result, Chavantes still has a social club called "Ouro Verde," previously destined to its coffee farmers elite only and where a "Queen of Coffee" pageant contest happened every year until the late 1960s. With the abolition of slavery in 1888 and an attempt of Brazil's government to "bleach" its ethnic composition which was greatly formed by descendants of enslaved Africans, the government began attracting Europeans such as Italians, Spanish, and Germans, in Western Europe, and in the East Poles, Ukrainians, Lithuanians, and Russians by offering them lands. After those, came the Japanese, Catholic Syrian and Lebanese. Thus, the majority of the Chavantes's population is formed by Portuguese and/or African-Native Brazilians, Spanish-, Italian-, Japanese-, and Syrian-Lebanese- Brazilians.

The coffee and other crops then produced in the region, including in Northern Parana' state were shipped via the Estrada de Ferro Sorocabana railway to the Port of Santos, Brazil's largest, and from there to Europe and Asia. The railway also transported individuals to towns in the interior, to the state capital, São Paulo and had connections with other systems in and outside the state. It was later named FEPASA and today it is basically extinct, due to a more efficient road and freight transport system. The small Chavantes historic train station is today one of the most conserved railway buildings in the state with its neo-baroque style facade, but the tracks have been invaded by weeds and there were plans to transform the station into a museum and educational center in the 1990s.

The town has grown considerably, comparing to the original size of the village closer to Paranapanema river. In the 1970s, during the military dictatorship, Chavantes advanced, becoming a more industrial setting, but its farmers still had great influence in various municipal matters. Francisco Faria, then the mayor, tried to modernize it, by demolishing the church square and building a Brasília-style one on its place, asphalt-paving streets and avenues and the modern prefeitura or city hall. Two new state elementary, middle/high schools were also built and the São Paulo Central Electric Co. built the Xavantes dam or "usina" in the Paranapema river, which would send power to states as far as Mato Grosso.

In the 1980s and 1990s with the Cruzeiro and Cruzado currencies devaluation, the Chavantes's industrial park almost disappeared and the town may have grown in number of houses only, due to state or city housing programs. Its students who had better opportunities than their parents, moved to bigger cities with electronic technical courses or engineering and liberal arts universities. Those who chose to stay ended up working as clerks, shop owners, in farming or in the electrical or alcohol "usinas." Most of its inhabitants claim that the town has stopped in time, as progress has somehow overlooked it, but Chavantes is still proud of having one of the only suspended and historic bridges in the country, which was once detonated by states that fought São Paulo in the 1932 revolution in which São Paulo stood alone against Brazil's dictator Vargas; a hydro-electric dam, now in the hands of Duke Energy, a US company; and its fertile terra-roxa soil that now produces sugar cane, soybean and other crops and attracts migrant workers.

== Media ==
In telecommunications, the city was served by Companhia Telefônica Brasileira until 1973, when it began to be served by Telecomunicações de São Paulo. In July 1998, this company was acquired by Telefónica, which adopted the Vivo brand in 2012.

The company is currently an operator of cell phones, fixed lines, internet (fiber optics/4G) and television (satellite and cable).

== See also ==
- List of municipalities in São Paulo
- Interior of São Paulo
