= Hypostomus scaphyceps =

Scientific classification
- Kingdom: Animalia
- Phylum: Chordata
- Class: Actinopterygii
- Order: Siluriformes
- Family: Loricariidae
- Genus: Hypostomus
- Species: H. scaphyceps

Binomial name
- Hypostomus scaphyceps (Nichols, 1919)

Synonyms
- Plecostomus scaphyceps

Species of fish

Hypostomus scaphyceps is a species of catfish in the family Loricariidae. It is native to South America, where it occurs in the Paranapanema River basin. FishBase states that the maximum length attained by the species is 3.5 cm (1.4 inches) SL, although that measurement has elsewhere been suggested to originate from a juvenile specimen, and as such the species can likely reach a size larger than that when fully grown.
