= Canitar =

Municipality in the state of São Paulo, Brazil

- Municipality
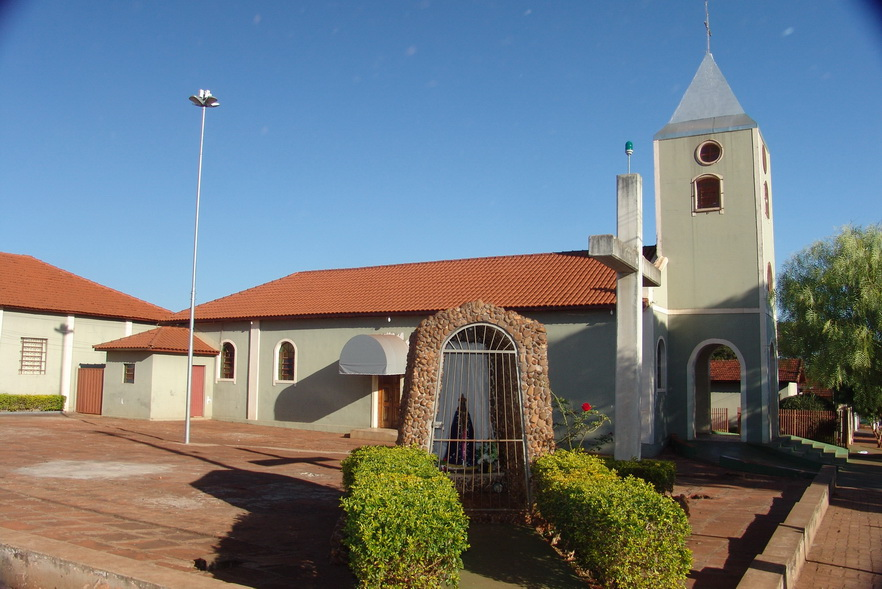
- View of Canitar

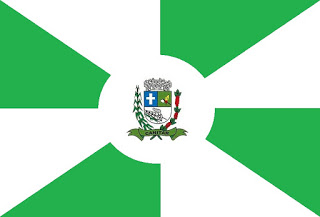
- Flag

- Location in São Paulo state

- Location in Brazil
- Coordinates: 23°0′23″S 49°47′0″W
- Country: Brazil
- Region: Southeast
- State: São Paulo

Area
  - Total: 57.5 km^{2} (22.2 sq mi)

Population (2020)
  - Total: 5,292
  - Density: 92.0/km^{2} (238/sq mi)
- Time zone: UTC−3 (BRT)

Canitar is a municipality in the southwestern part of the state of São Paulo in Brazil. The population is 5,292 (2020 est.) in an area of 57.5 km^{2} (22.2 sq mi). It was a district of the municipality of Chavantes until 1991, when it became an independent municipality. Like Chavantes, Canitar belongs to the comarca of Ourinhos, its neighboring city and seat of the comarca to the West. Canitar also has borders with Chavantes to the North, East & South. The Raposo Tavares state road separates Canitar from Irapé, a district in Chavantes and one of the oldest settlements in the region. The economy is based on agriculture, particularly sugar cane plantations of the Sao Luis processing plant in Ourinhos, one of the major cities in the Paranapanema River valley area.

== Media ==
In telecommunications, the city was served by Telecomunicações de São Paulo. In July 1998, this company was acquired by Telefónica, which adopted the Vivo brand in 2012. The company is currently an operator of cell phones, fixed lines, internet (fiber optics/4G) and television (satellite and cable).

== See also ==
- List of municipalities in São Paulo
- Interior of São Paulo
