= Diocese of Ourinhos =

Catholic ecclesiastical territory

Diocese of Ourinhos Dioecesis Parvauratana Diocese de Ourinhos
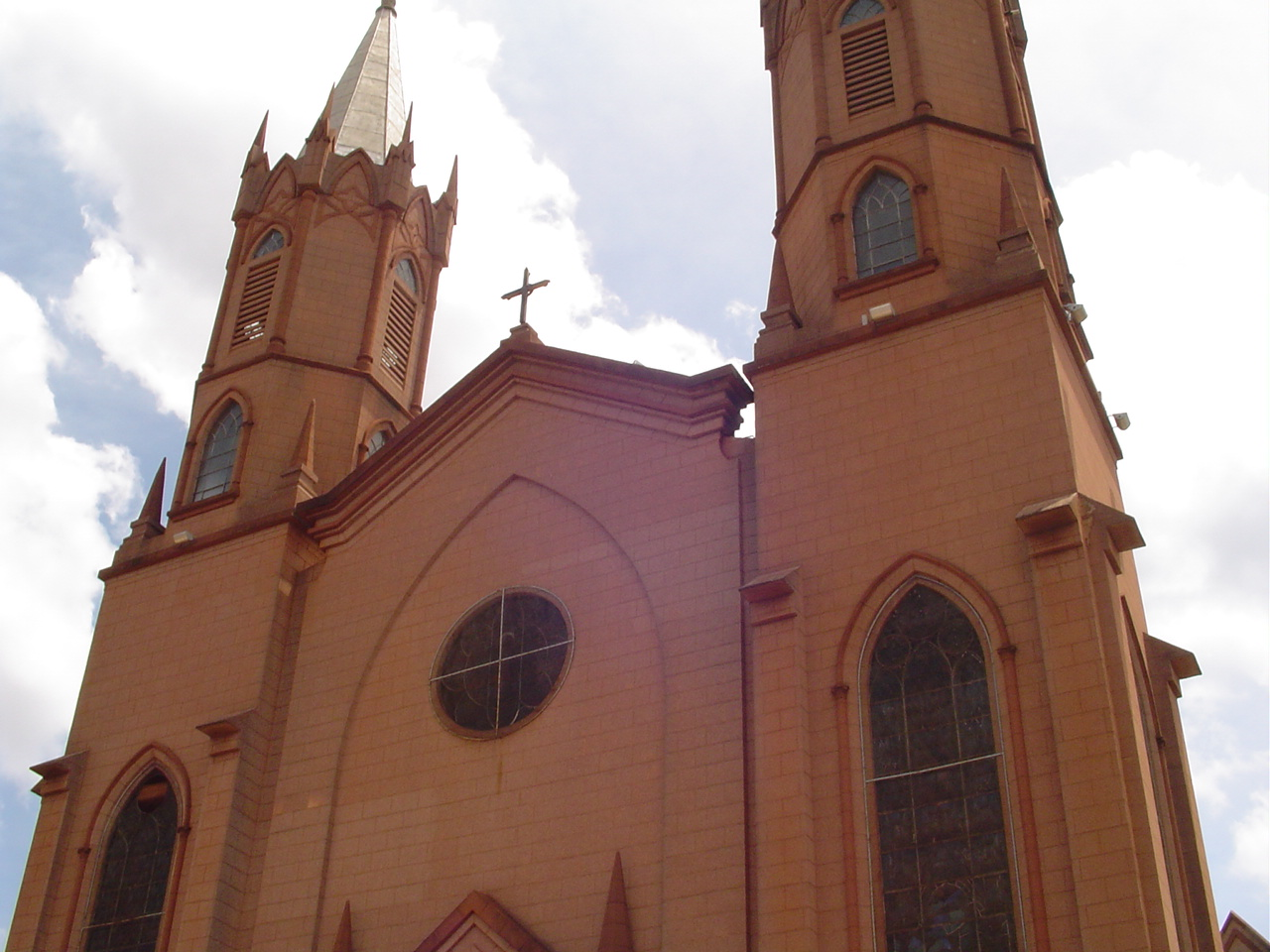
- Cathedral of the Good Lord Jesus

Location
- Country: Brazil
- Ecclesiastical province: Botucatu
- Metropolitan: Botucatu
- Coordinates: 22°58′46″S 49°52′13″W

Statistics
- Area: 6,713 km^{2} (2,592 sq mi)
- Population: Total; Catholics: (as of 2004); 294,610; 147,305 (50.0%)

Information
- Rite: Latin Rite
- Established: 30 December 1998 (27 years ago)
- Cathedral: Cathedral of the Good Lord Jesus in Ourinhos

Current leadership
- Pope: Leo XIV
- Bishop: Eduardo Vieira dos Santos
- Metropolitan Archbishop: Maurício Grotto de Camargo
- Bishops emeritus: Salvatore Paruzzo

The Roman Catholic Diocese of Ourinhos (Latin: Dioecesis Parvauratana) is a diocese located in the city of Ourinhos in the ecclesiastical province of Botucatu in Brazil.

== History ==
- December 30, 1998: Established as Diocese of Ourinhos from the Diocese of Assis, Metropolitan Archdiocese of Botucatu and Diocese of Itapeva

== Leadership ==
- Bishops of Ourinhos (Roman rite)
  - Bishop Salvatore Paruzzo (December 30, 1998 – May 19, 2021)
  - Bishop Eduardo Vieira dos Santos (May 19, 2021 – present)

== Sources ==
- GCatholic.org
- Catholic Hierarchy
