= Itararé River =

River in Brazil

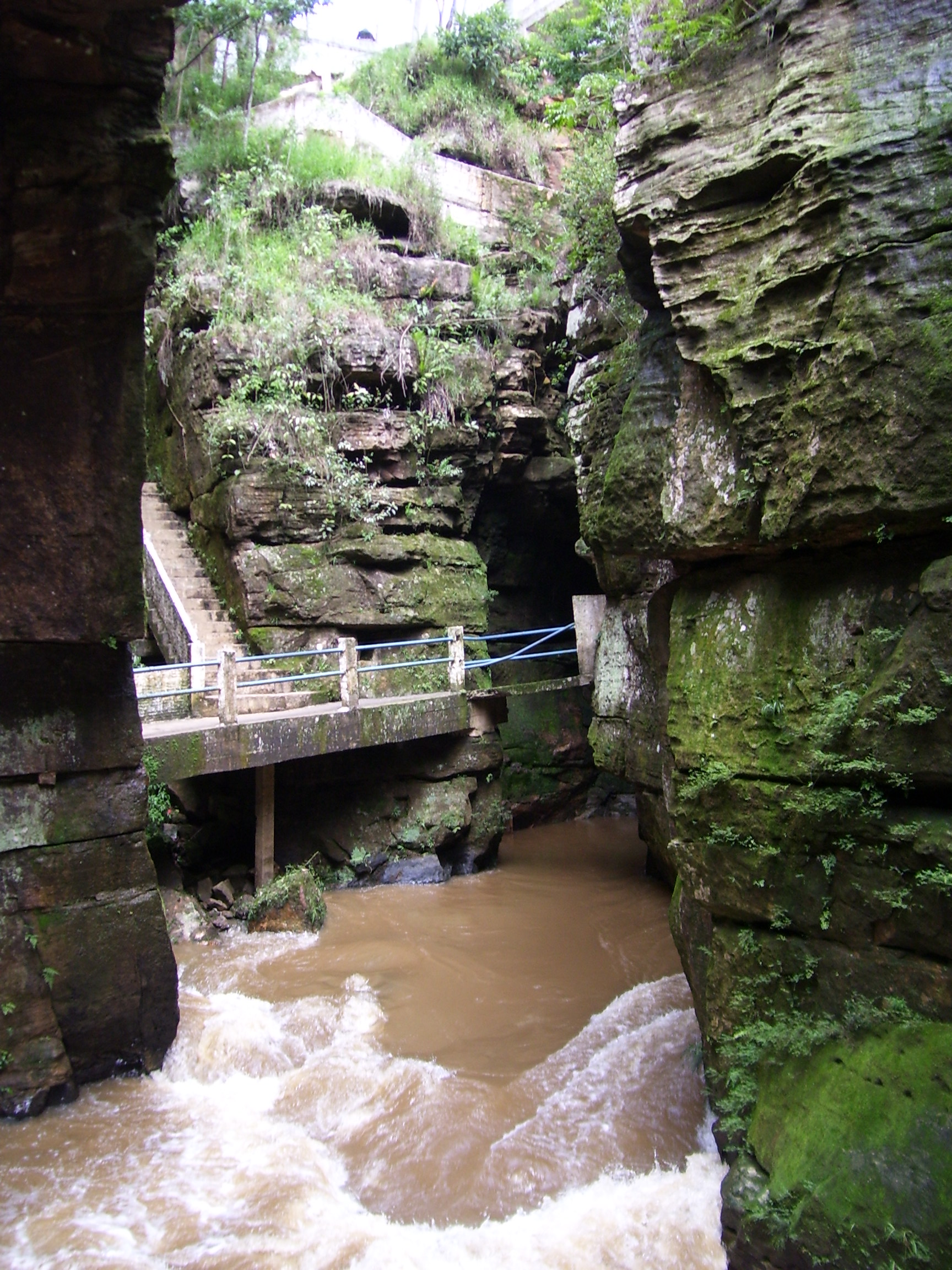

Location
- Country: Brazil

Physical characteristics
- Source
  - location: Paraná state
- Mouth: Paranapanema River
  - coordinates: 23°10′S 49°42′W

The Itararé River is a river on the boundary between the Paraná and São Paulo states in southeastern Brazil.

== See also ==
- List of rivers of Paraná
- List of rivers of São Paulo
