= Capivara Dam =

Dam in Porecatu, Paraná, Brazil

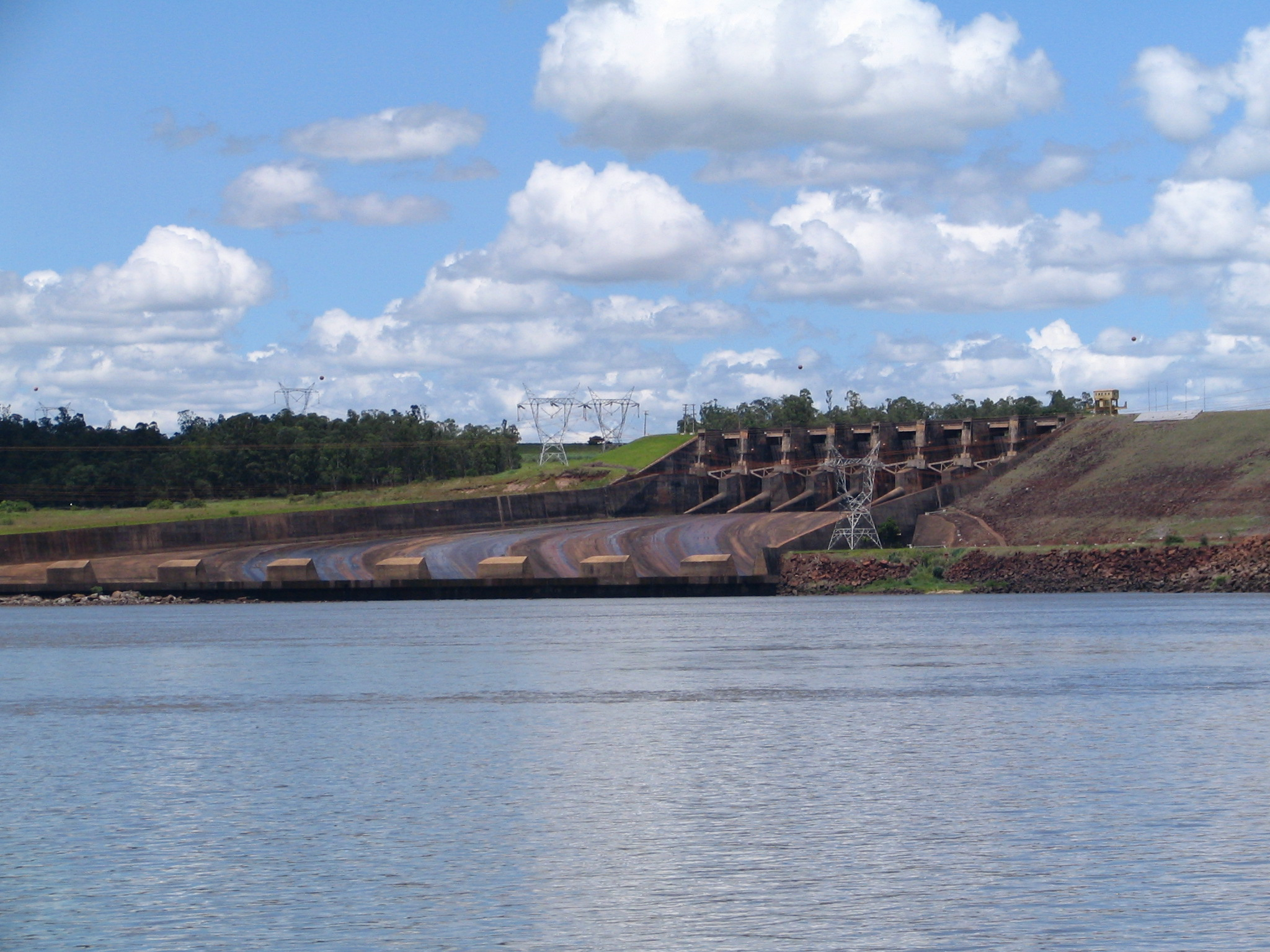
- Spillway of the Capivara Dam

- Location within Brazil
- Official name: Usina Hidrelétrica de Capivara
- Country: Brazil
- Location: Porecatu, PR
- Coordinates: 22°39′36.33″S 51°21′28.72″W
- Purpose: Power
- Status: Operational
- Construction began: 1971
- Opening date: 1978
- Owner: Duke Energy Generation Paranapanema International

Dam and spillways
- Type of dam: Embankment
- Impounds: Paranapanema River
- Height: 59 m (194 ft)
- Spillway type: Gate-controlled

Reservoir
- Total capacity: 10,540,000,000 m^{3} (8,540,000 acre⋅ft)
- Catchment area: 80,000 km^{2} (31,000 sq mi)
- Surface area: 515 km^{2} (199 sq mi)
- Maximum water depth: 48.4 m (159 ft)

Power Station
- Commission date: 1977
- Turbines: 4 x 154.75 MW (207,520 hp) Francis-type
- Installed capacity: 619 MW (830,000 hp)

The Capivara Dam is an embankment dam on the Paranapanema River about 10 kilometres (6.2 mi) north of Porecatu, PR in Brazil. It is located along the border of the state of São Paulo to the north and the state of Paraná to the south. It was constructed between 1971 and 1978 for the primary purpose of hydroelectric power generation. The dam's first generator was commissioned in 1977. The dam can store up to 10,540,000,000 cubic metres (8,540,000 acre⋅ft) in its reservoir which also covers and area of 515 square kilometres (199 sq mi). It is operated by Duke Energy Generation Paranapanema International.

== See also ==
- List of reservoirs by surface area
