= SEADE =

Brazilian independent public agency sponsored by the Sao Paulo state

The Fundação Sistema Estadual de Análise de Dados (Statewise System for Data Analysis Foundation), known as Fundação SEADE (SEADE Foundation), is an independent public agency sponsored by the São Paulo state in Brazil. It is linked to São Paulo's Planning and Management Office (Secretaria de Planejamento e Gestão). It is a national reference center for producing and disseminating socioeconomic and demographic analysis. SEADE performs direct research and data gathering using information from other sources, compiling a huge dataset and publishing it for free. Those datasets allow picturing several aspects of the socioeconomic reality and historical evolution of the São Paulo state, its regions, and municipalities.

Its extensive and diverse product line helps public administrators, businesses, journalists, academics, and other citizens learn about São Paulo's social/economic evolution. It allows impact assessment of public policies over its 645 municipalities.

== History ==
The SEADE Foundation's origins remounts to the late XIX century with the creation of the Repartição da Estatística e Arquivo do Estado (State Division for Statistics and Files) in March 1892.

In 1936, the Convenção Nacional de Estatística (National Statistics Convention), endorsed by all Brazilian states, regularly established the mandatory publication of standardized statewide statistical annuaries. The Departamento Estadual de Estatística – DEE (State Statistics Department) was created to produce these reports. Regulated by an October 1938 decree, the DEE took over the services of the Repartição da Estatística e do Arquivo. It became the new central organization for statistics for the São Paulo state.

In 1950, the DEE was replaced by the Departamento de Estatística do Estado de São Paulo – DEESP (São Paulo's Statistics Department).

In 1976, the DEESP was incorporated by the Coordenadoria de Análise de Dados – CAD (Data Analisis Coordinating Body). The CAD was responsible for the Sistema Estadual de Análise de Dados Estatísticos, created in 1975. In 1978, Law #1,866, from December 4, created the Fundação Sistema Estadual de Análise de Dados – SEADE. The following year, its statutes were approved by decree #13,161 when the Foundation got its current juridic form and operating rules.
