= Salto Grande, São Paulo =

Salto Grande
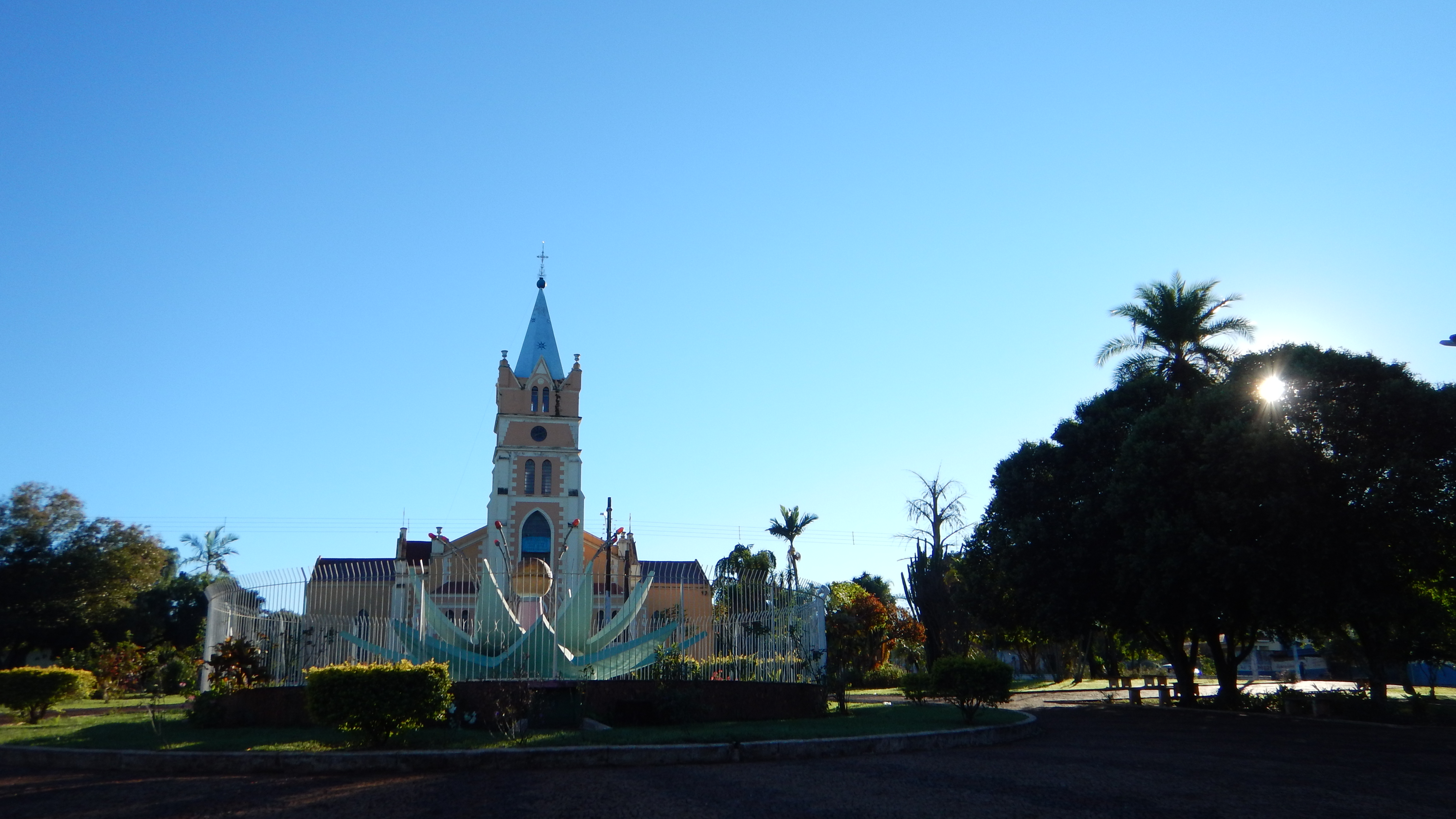

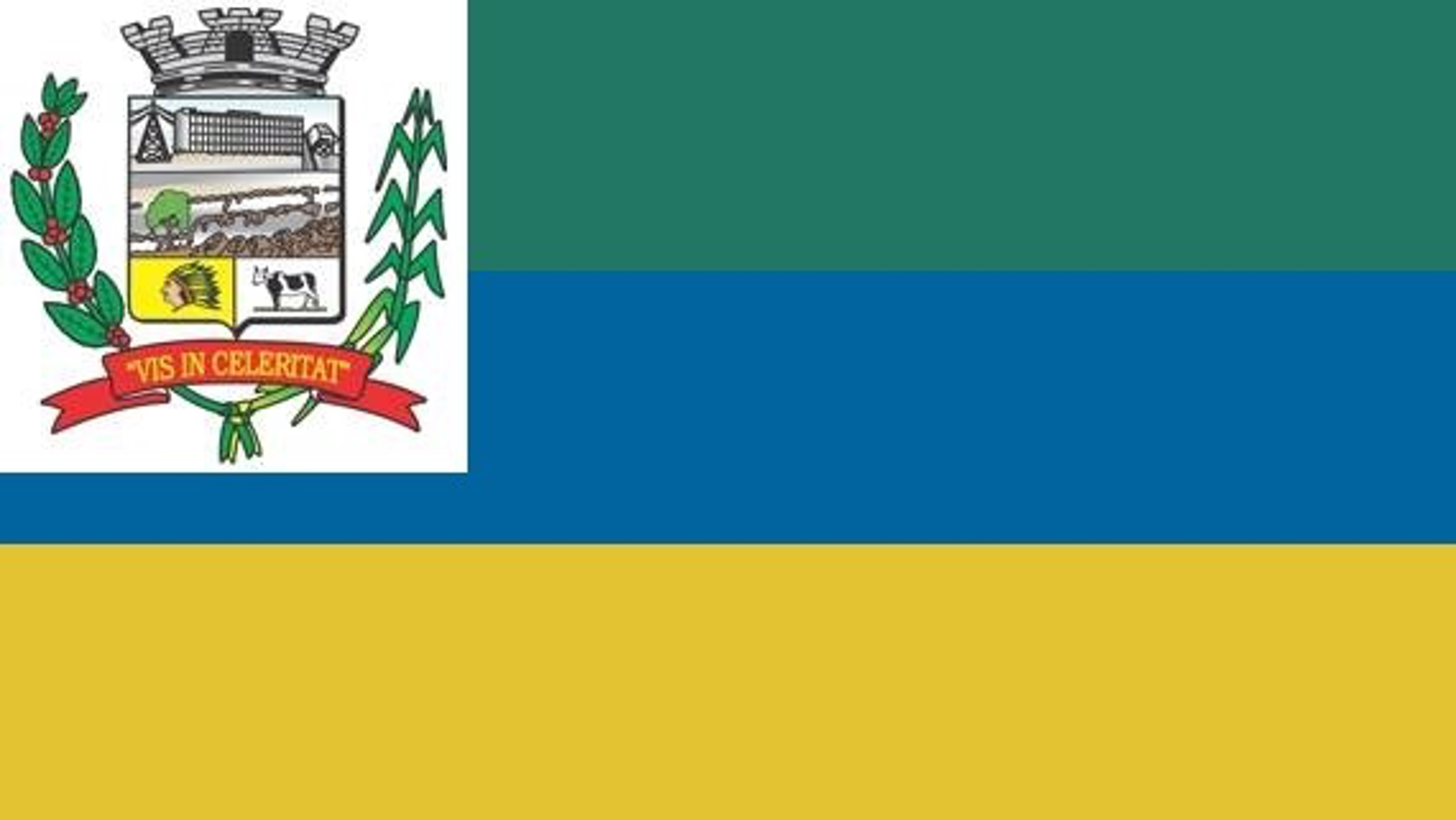
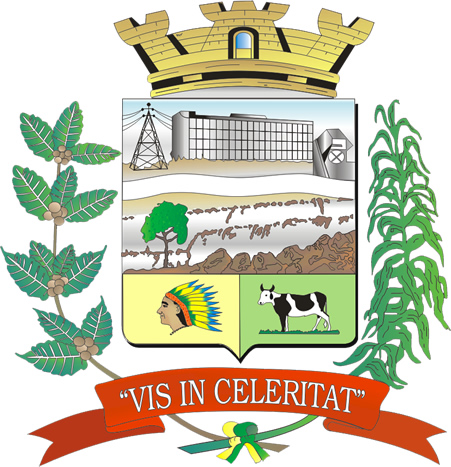
- Flag Coat of arms
- Motto: VIS IN CELERITATE ("the driving force")

- Location in Brazil
- Coordinates: 22°53′34″S 49°59′08″W
- Country: Brazil
- Region: Southeast
- State: São Paulo
- Founded: 1911

Government
  - Mayor: Dirceu Feltrin (PTB (2013–2016))

Area
  - City: 189.072 km^{2} (73.001 sq mi)
- Elevation: 436 m (1,430 ft)

Population (2020)
  - City: 9,364
  - Density: 49.53/km^{2} (128.3/sq mi)
  - Urban: 7,933
  - Rural: 854
- Demonym: Saltograndense
- Time zone: UTC−3 (BRT)
- Postal Code (CEP): 19920-000
- Area code: (+55) 14
- Website: www.pmsaltogrande.sp.gov.br

Salto Grande is a municipality in the state of São Paulo in Brazil. The population in 2020 is 9,364 and the area is 189.072 km^{2} (73.001 sq mi). The elevation is 436 m (1,430 ft).

== Origin of the name ==
Due to the large waterfalls that existed in the city submersed by damming of rivers for the construction of the hydroelectric plant. First, the city was called the Cachoeira Dos Dourados, then by Salto Grande do Paranapanema and from 1922 Salto Grande.

== History ==
Around 1843 the region was inhabited by Caiuás and Guarani Indians, entrusted to catechesis of Friar pacific of Monte Falco, brought from Italy by Antonina Baron, owner of extensive land grants in northern of Paraná and southern of São Paulo. José Teodoro de Souza, who years earlier had been interested in the lands, recorded in 1856 a possession that was beginning in Salto Grande's waterfall in the river Paranapanema, and went to the mouth of the river Tibagi.Em then promoted the local population with white and catechized Indians, for use in agricultural work. Thus was born the village of Salto Grande do Paranapanema, on a small column on the banks of the Paranapanema and Rio Novo rivers.

== Demography ==
Race and ethnicity in São Paulo
Ethnicity	Percentage
White	68.90%
Pardo (Multiracial)	27.13%
Black	3.27%
Asian	0.68%
Amerindian	0.02%

In 2014, Salto grande was the 383º most populous city in Brazil and according to the 2010 IBGE Census, there were 8,787 people residing in the city. The census found 6,054 White people (68,90%), 2,384 Pardo (multiracial) people (27,13%), 287 Black people (3,27%), 60 Asian people (0,68%) and 2 Amerindian people (0.02%).

Data of the Census of 2010

- Total population: 8.787
  - Metro: 7.933 (90,3%)
  - Rural: 854 (9,7%)
  - Men: 4.353 (49,55%)
  - Women: 4.434 (50,45%)

Population density (inhabitants/km^{2}): 46,64

Infant mortality up to 1 year (per thousand): 15.5

Infant mortality up to 5 year (per thousand): 18

Life expectancy (years): 74.5

Total fertility rate: 2.41

Literacy rate: 84,63%

Human Development Index (HDI): 0.704

- HDI GDP: 0.664
- HDI longevity: 0.825
- HDI education: 0.637

Source: IPEAdata

== Culture and leisure ==
=== Points of interest ===
Because of its location, natural environment and a climate with well defined seasons, has Salto Grande tourism potential. The hot, dry and stable climate makes the city on the banks of the Paranapanema River, a common destination for those who want to be in touch with nature, either by water sports, or otherwise.

==== The beach ("Prainha") ====
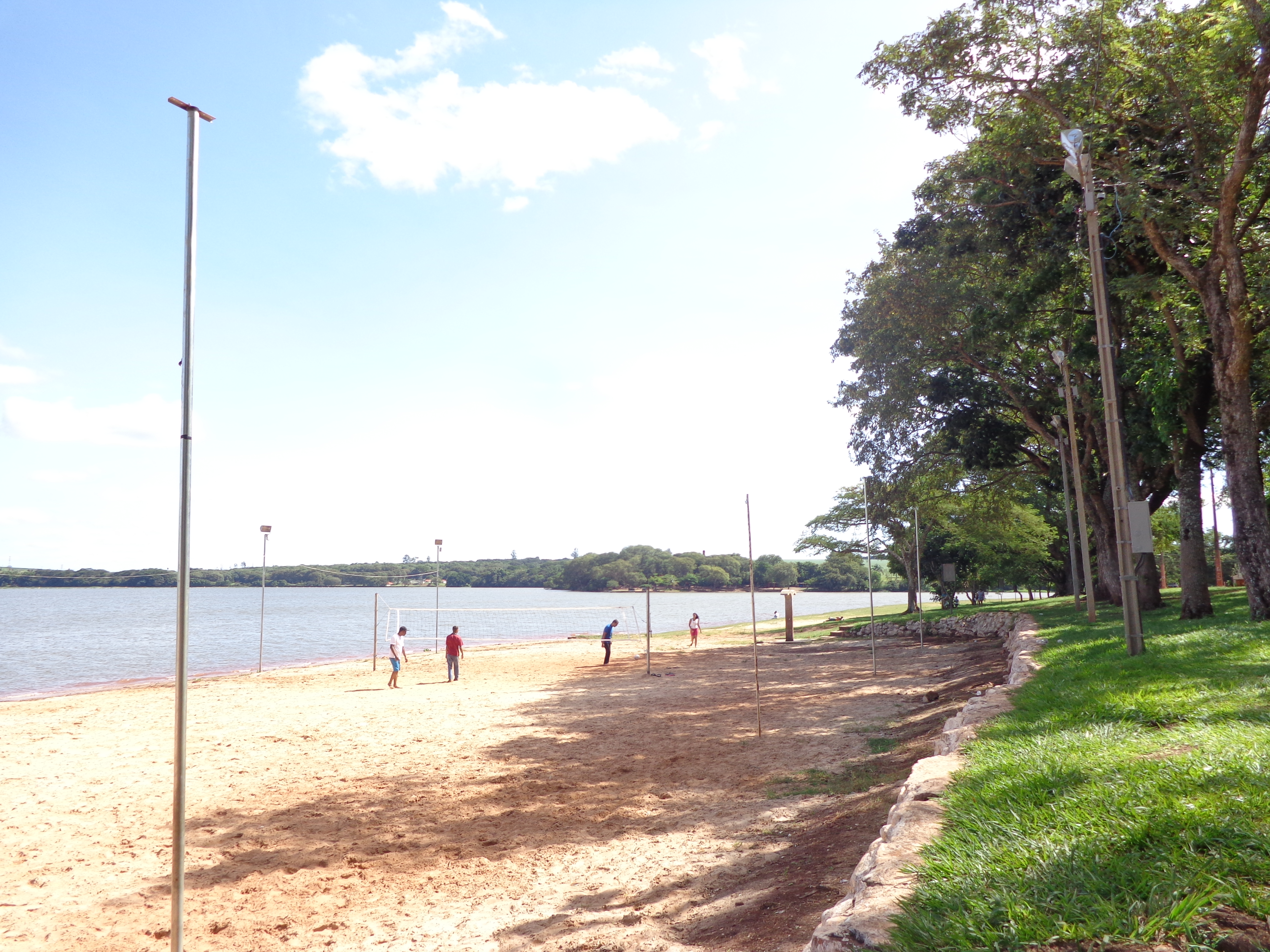
The Salto Grande beach.

Located on the banks of the Paranapanema River, the beach of Salto Grande, locally known as "Prainha" by the townspeople, is an artificial beach that has almost 4 km of long and is one of the main tourist points of the city.

It is used for water sports, using water bike, kayak, boat and paddle boats and the area has a barbecue site and an area for walking and hiking. Salto Grande earned the nickname "Cidade Praia" ("Beach city") because of the many visitors to the beach, especially during its events and festivals.

=== Archaeological site ===
Discovered in 1990 by a team of University of São Paulo, have been found several pieces and indigenous funerary urns with over a thousand years old, where were buried (in the urns) bodies of Indians who lived in the region. These research aim to rebuild the characteristics of settlement over 8000 years and so study their way of life and their local customs.

== Media ==
In telecommunications, the city was served by Telecomunicações de São Paulo. In July 1998, this company was acquired by Telefónica, which adopted the Vivo brand in 2012. The company is currently an operator of cell phones, fixed lines, internet (fiber optics/4G) and television (satellite and cable).

== See also ==
- List of municipalities in São Paulo
- Interior of São Paulo
