= Paranapanema River =

River in Brazil

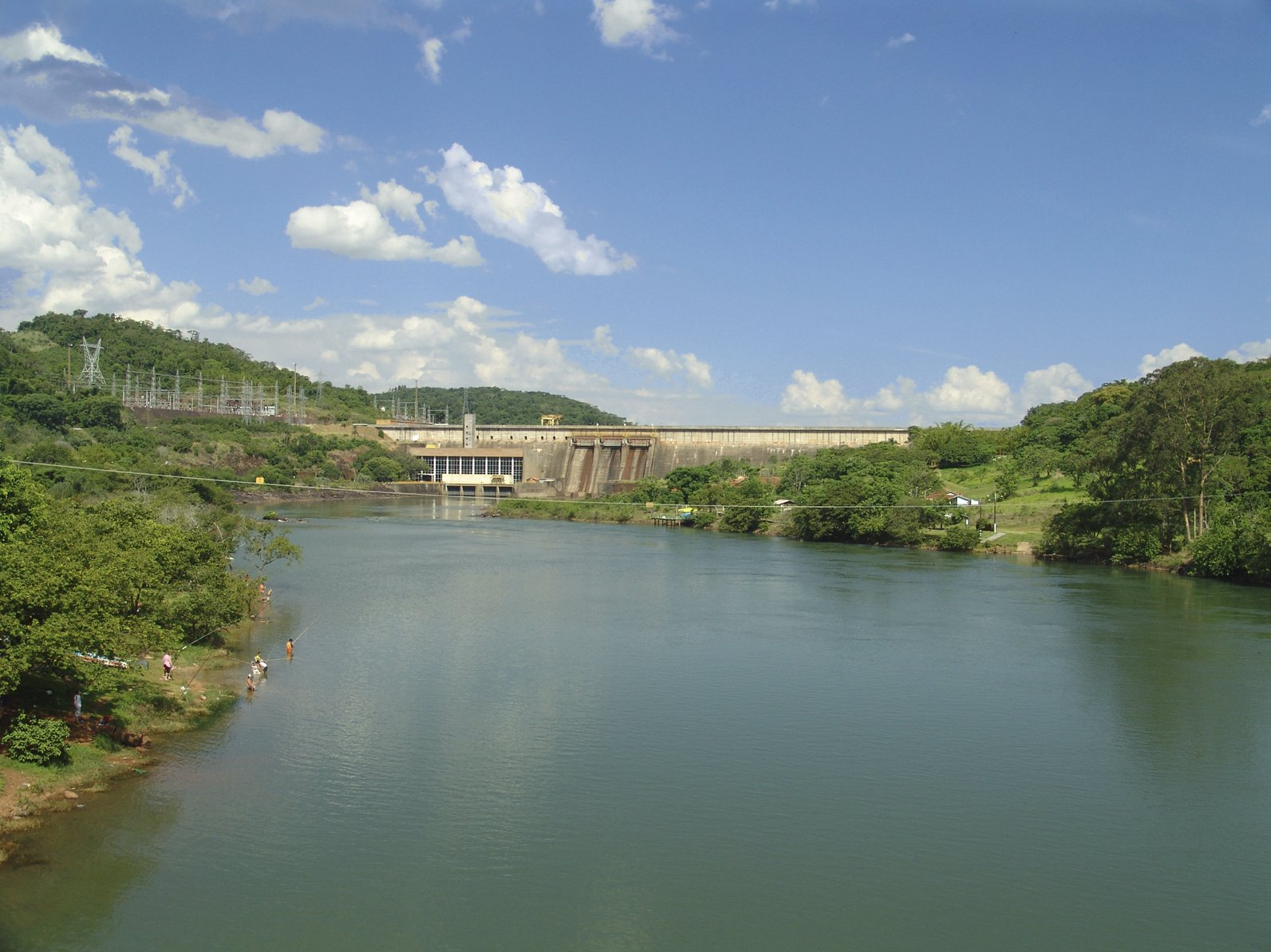

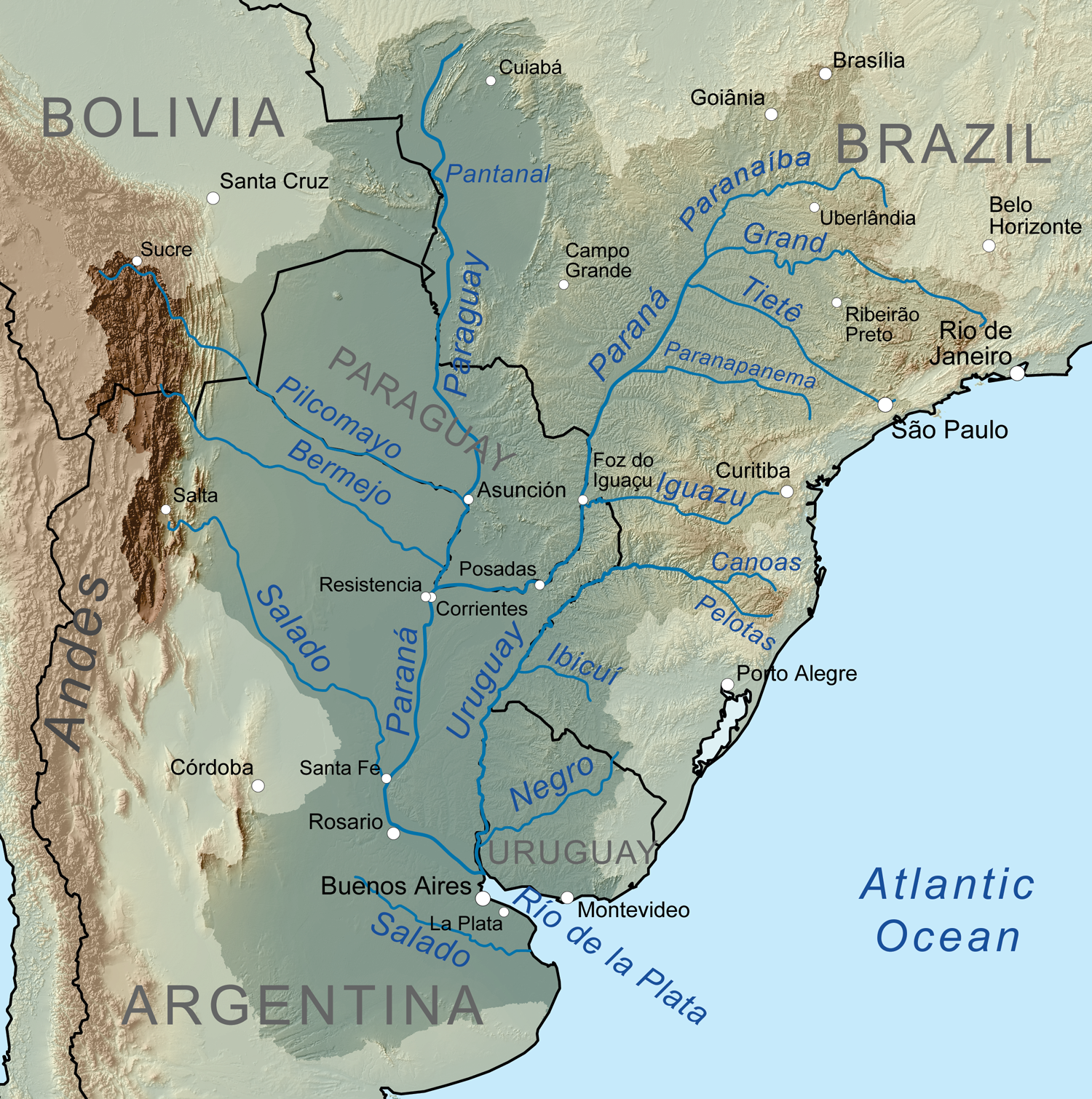
- Map of the La Plata Basin, showing the Paranapanema River joining the upper Paraná River.

Location
- Country: Brazil
- State: São Paulo, Paraná

Physical characteristics
- Source: Serra dos Agudos
  - coordinates: 24°51′S 48°10′W
  - elevation: 910 m (2,990 ft)
- Mouth: Paraná River
  - location: Brazil
  - coordinates: 22°39′31″S 53°5′15″W
  - elevation: 233 m (764 ft)
- Length: 929 km (577 mi)
- Basin size: 101,738.7 km^{2} (39,281.5 mi^{2})
- Discharge
  - location: Near mouth
  - average: (Period: 1971–2000)1,198.4 m^{3}/s (42,320 cu ft/s)

Basin features
- Progression: Paraná → Río de la Plata → Atlantic Ocean
- River system: Río de la Plata
- Tributaries
  - left: Apiai-Guaçu, Taquari-Guaçu, Itararé, Das Cinzas, Tibagi, Pirapó
  - right: Itapetininga, Pardo

The Paranapanema River (Portuguese, Rio Paranapanema) is one of the most important rivers of the interior of the Brazilian state of São Paulo. The river forms most of the boundary between the states of São Paulo and Paraná.

== Course ==
From source to mouth the Paranapanema River has an elevation drop of 677 metres (2,221 ft). The river's length is about 929 kilometres (577 mi). It flows generally west, reaching the Paraná River at an altitude of about 233 metres (764 ft).

The sources of the river are protected by the 22,269 hectares (55,030 acres) Nascentes do Paranapanema State Park, created in 2012. The sources are situated in the Serra Agudos Grandes, in south-central São Paulo, approximately 100 kilometres (62 mi) from the Atlantic coast.

From the sources to the mouth of the Itararé River, the Paranapaneba flows within the territory of São Paulo state. Below the Itararé the Paranapanema forms the border between the states of Paraná and São Paulo.

The river is associated with a date according to State Law 10.488/99 (Antônio Salim Curiati), sanctioned by Governor Mário Covas, designated as August 27.

The Paranapanema is the least polluted river of the state of São Paulo.

== Gradient ==
The average total gradient of the Paranapanema River, from its sources to its mouth in the Paraná River is 61 cm/km, not considering the first 100 km, where the river descends from the Serra of Paranapiacaba, at an average gradient of 43 cm/km, a value relatively low for a stream with a length of 929 km.

The Paranapanema river may be divided into three principal stretches:

=== Lower Paranapanema ===
From its mouth at the Paraná River, to the Grande Falls, a length of 421 km, the average gradient is 29 cm/km. There are widths of more than 200 m, deeper and shallower stretches, widths that reach nearly 800 m. The radii of curvature are in the order of 1.000 m. The course is more or less meandering presenting a complete horizontal equilibrium, with an excess, only of the stretch close to the junction with the Paraná River, which includes moving sand-banks and islands.

=== Middle Paranapanema ===
From the Grande Falls up to the confluence with the Apiaí-Guaçu River, with a length of 328 km, the river descends a total of 210 m. It is not possible to calculate an average gradient on this stretch, because due to the construction of various dams for the provisioning of hydroelectric power, the level will fall abruptly at those dams.

=== Upper Paranapanema ===
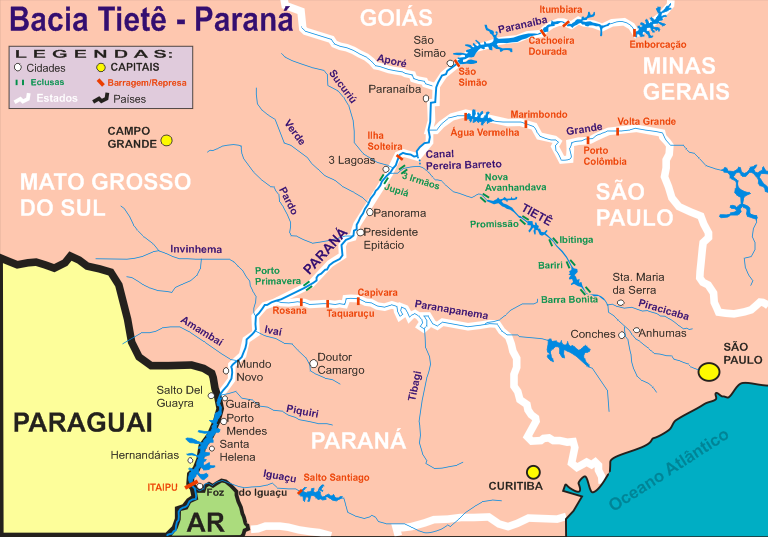
Basin of Paranapanema, Tiete, and Paraná

The Upper Paranapanema reaches from the confluence of the Apiaí-Guaçu River to the river's sources in the Serra de Agudos Grandes, with a length of 180 km. The average gradient is quite high, 150 cm/km. It drains a series of streams that descend from the Serra of Paranapiacaba, the Upper Paranapanema is gaining size and consolidates to receive the Itapetininga River and Apiaí-Guaçu river.

== Navigation ==
Navigation of the Paranapanema River is practical along the lower course up to the port of Euclides da Cunha, down the chute of the Coroa do Frade, with a length of about 70 km, counting from the mouth into the Paraná River. Navigation is fairly hazardous. Under normal conditions the minimum depth of this stretch may be estimated at 1.5 metres (4.9 ft).

For the last 421 km downstream, the course between the mouth and the dam of Salto Grande, the average gradient is an about 29 cm/km.

The main natural obstacles that interrupt or make navigation dangerous are: a basalt bank, hidden rocks, reduced current velocity, too little depth, a straight canal in the middle of the river, an elevated current velocity, an undulating movement, a sinuous canal, sand banks, and stretches with high gradient.

The great reserves of water held in the Paranapanema's reservoirs have considerable influence on the regime of the river in its middle course. In the lower course the influence is reduced, with no effect on the natural conditions that completely impede navigation.

=== Dams and reservoirs ===
The Paranapanema River has in total eight dams and their respective reservoirs. The following table traces a list going in the direction of the Paraná River.

Dam	Reservoir	power generation	Área of the reservoir
Hydroelectric Plant of Jurumirim	Reservoir of Jurumirim	98 MW	449 km^{2}
Hydroelectric Plant of Chavantes	-	414 MW	400 km^{2}
Hydroelectric Plant of Salto Grande	-	74 MW	12 km^{2}
Hydroelectric Plant of Canoas II	-	72 MW	22.5 km^{2}
Hydroelectric Plant of Canoas I	-	81 MW	30.85 km^{2}
Hydroelectric Plant of Capivara	Reservoir of Capivara	619 MW	576 km^{2}
Hydroelectric Plant of Taquaruçu	-	526 MW	80.1 km^{2}
Hydroelectric Plant of Rosana	-	353 MW	220 km^{2}

== Photo gallery ==
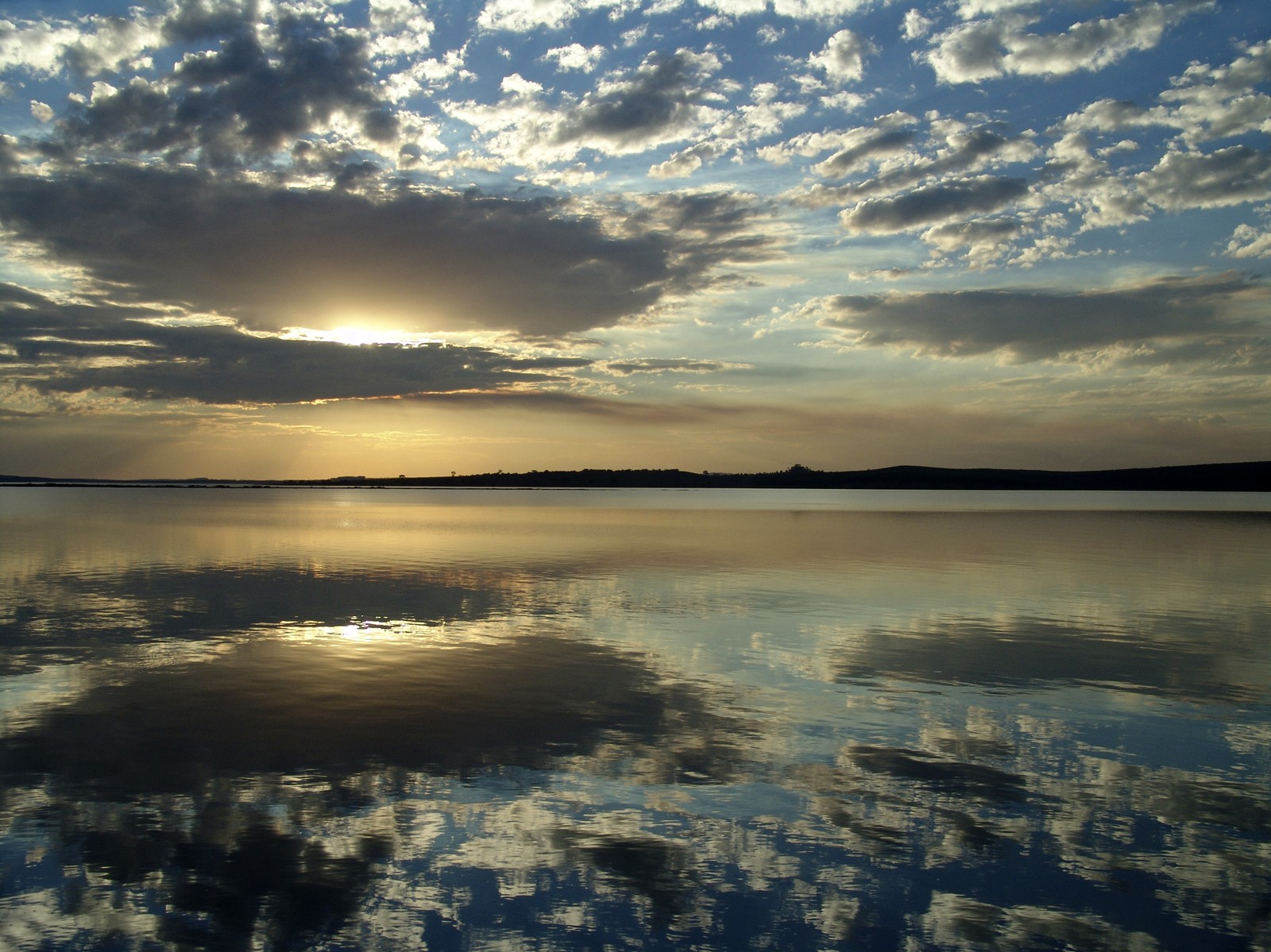
View of the river in the municipality of Paranapanema.

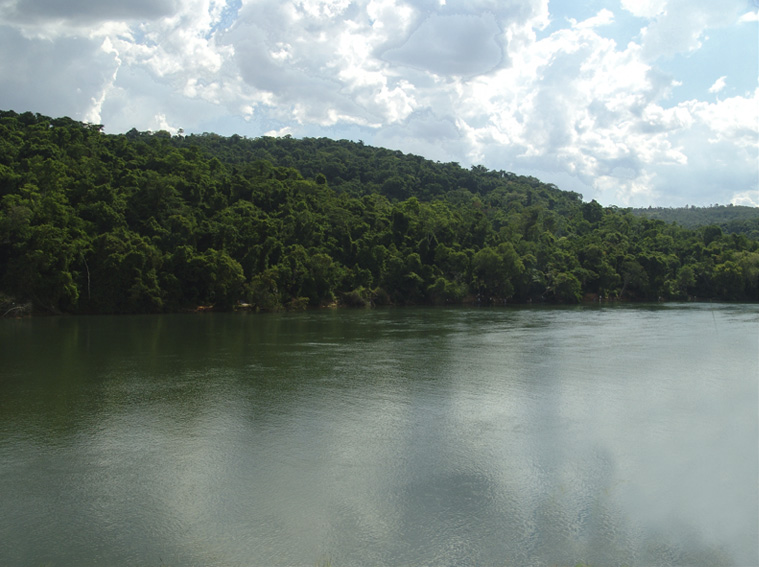
The river in Cerqueira César

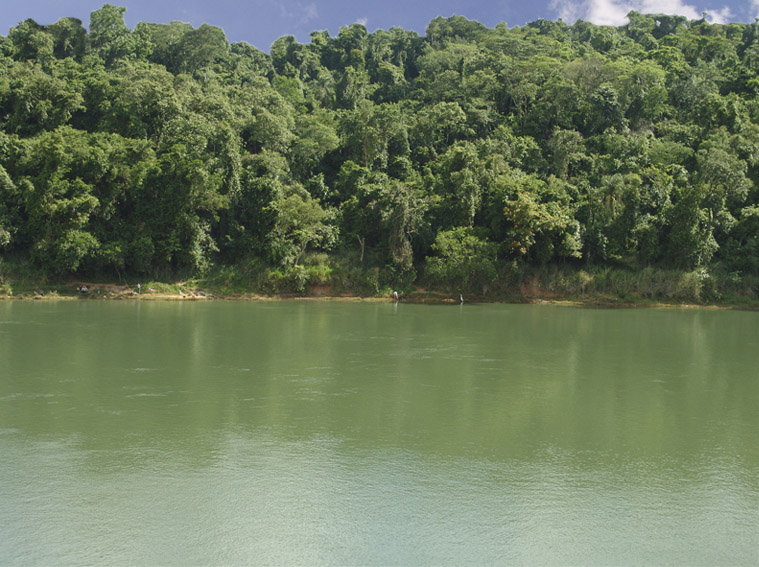
Border with Piraju

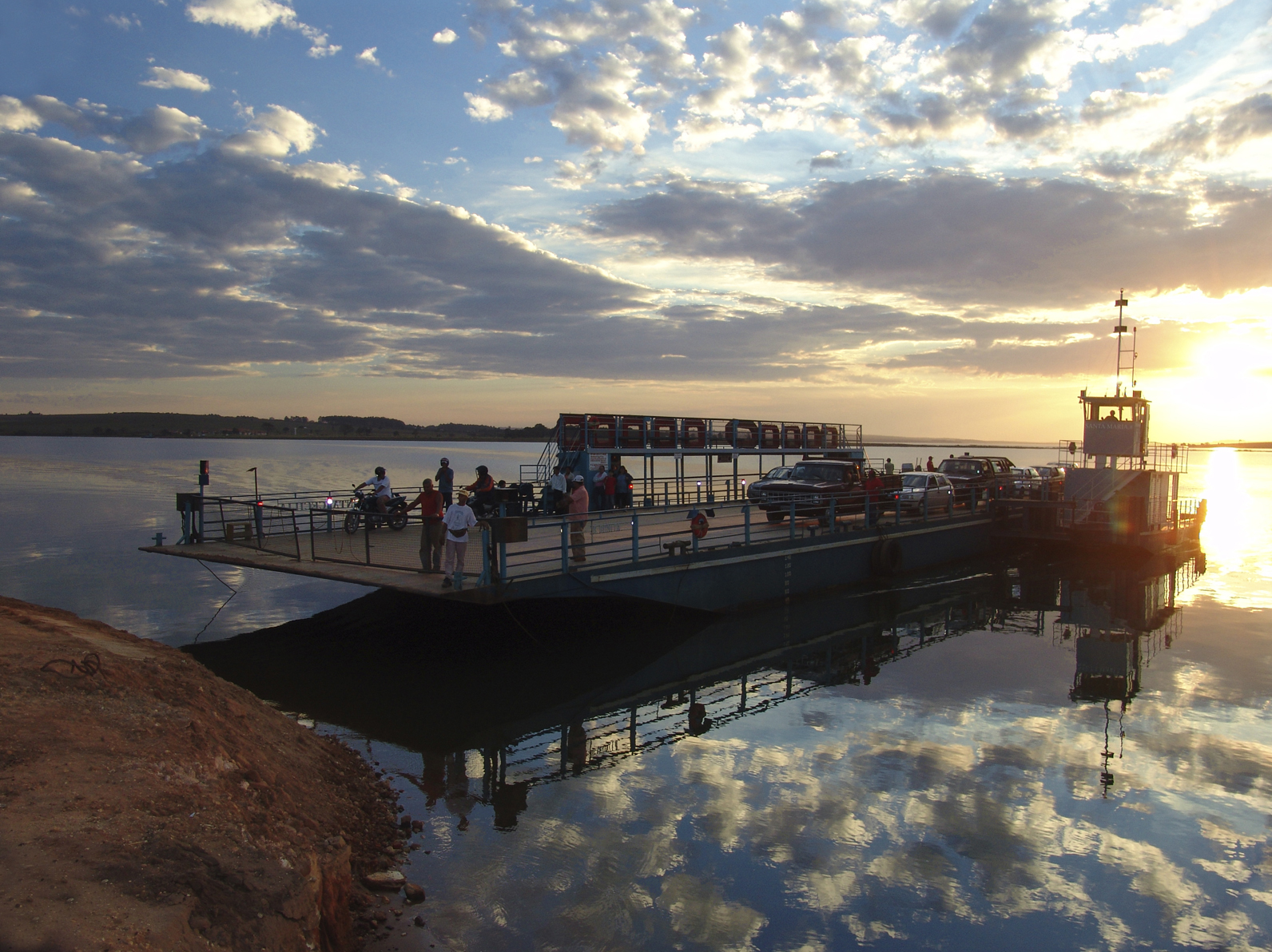
Ferry joining Paranapanema to Itatinga and SP-280

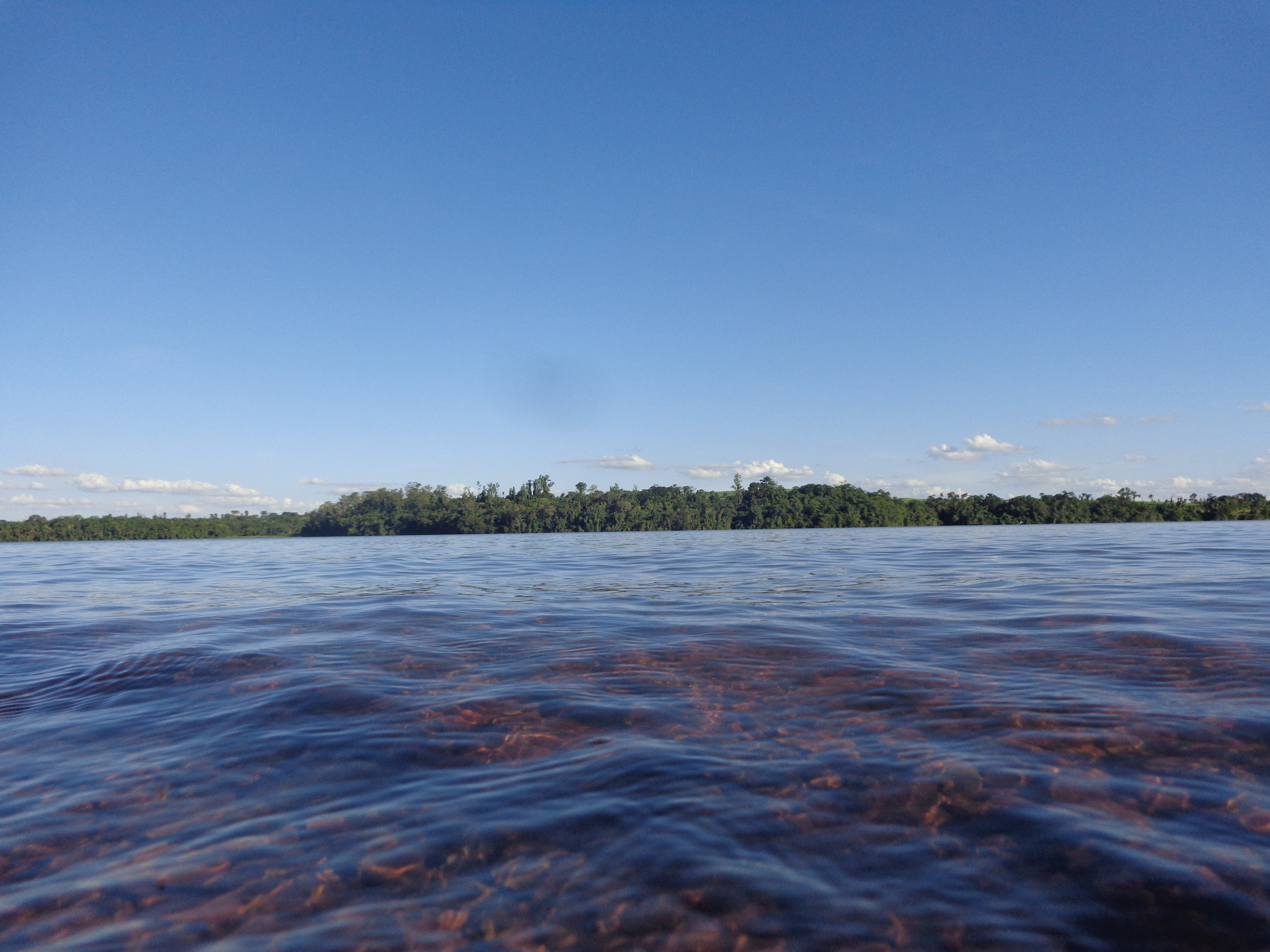
View of the river in the municipality of Salto Grande

== See also ==
- Tributaries of the Río de la Plata
