= Bonita =

Bonita may refer to:

== Music ==
- "Bonita" (Antônio Carlos Jobim song), 1963
- "Bonita", a song by Álvaro Soler from Mar de colores, 2017
- "Bonita", a song by Daddy Yankee, 2023
- "Bonita", a song by J Balvin, 2017
- "Bonita", a song by Juanes and Sebastián Yatra, 2019
- "Bonita", a song by Maître Gims, 2018

== Places ==
=== Turkey ===
- Bonita (Paphlagonia), an ancient town

=== United States ===
- Bonita, Arizona
- Bonita, California
- Bonita, Kansas
- Bonita, Louisiana
- Bonita, Oregon
- Bonita, Texas
- Bonita, Washington
- Bonita, Wisconsin
- Bonita Avenue, in Baltimore County, Maryland
- Bonita Canyon, in the Chiricahua Mountains, Arizona
- Bonita Channel, a shipping channel in Marin County, California
- Bonita Creek, a stream in Orange County, California
- Bonita Falls, a set of waterfalls in California

== Schools ==
- Bonita Elementary School District, Graham County, Arizona
- Bonita Unified School District, Los Angeles County, California
  - Bonita High School, La Verne, California
- Bonita Vista High School, Chula Vista, California

== Ships ==
- Bonita (1900 sternwheeler), a steamboat in Oregon, U.S.
- USS Bonita, various ships and submarines of the United States Navy

== Other uses ==
- Bonita (fish), or little tunny, a species of tuna
- Bonita (crab), a genus of soft-bodied crabs in the family Pinnotheridae
- Bonita (name), including a list of people with the name
- Bonitasaura

== See also ==
- Bonito (disambiguation)
- Bonata (disambiguation)
- La Bonita (disambiguation)
