= Bonito (disambiguation) =

Bonito is a name given to various species of fish of the genus Sarda.

Bonito may also refer to:

== Fish ==
- Skipjack tuna is often called "bonito", especially in Japanese cuisine; it is also known as arctic bonito or oceanic bonito.
- Bonito flakes or katsuobushi, flakes of dried, fermented skipjack tuna, are used in Japanese cuisine.

== Music ==
- Kero Kero Bonito, a British band from London, England

== Places ==
- Bonito, Bahia, a town in Brazil
- Bonito, Campania, a comune in the province of Avellino, Italy
- Bonito Canyon, Arizona, a 400-ft-deep canyon in the Apache County, was the site of a skirmish between Native Americans and mounted troops on October 17, 1858.
- Bonito, Mato Grosso do Sul, a municipality in Brazil
- Bonito, Pará, a town in Brazil
- Bonito, Pernambuco, a city in Brazil
- Bonito Lake, an alpine reservoir northwest of Ruidoso, New Mexico
- Bonito de Minas, a municipality in Minas Gerais, Brazil
- Bonito Oriental, a municipality in Colón, Honduras
- Bonito de Santa Fé, a municipality in Paraíba, Brazil
- Pueblo Bonito, an archeological site in Chaco Culture National Historical Park, New Mexico, USA
- Bonito River (disambiguation) or Rio Bonito (disambiguation), the name of several rivers

== Other uses ==
- Bonito (album), a 2003 album by Jarabe de Palo
  - "Bonito" (song), the title track
- FT Bonito, a kit car by Fiberfab
- A web interface of Sketch Engine, a corpus manager
- The Google Pixel 3a XL, a 2019 smartphone codenamed "bonito"

== See also ==
- Bonita (disambiguation)
- Benito (disambiguation)
