= Yamhill River lock and dam =

Yamhill River Lock and Dam
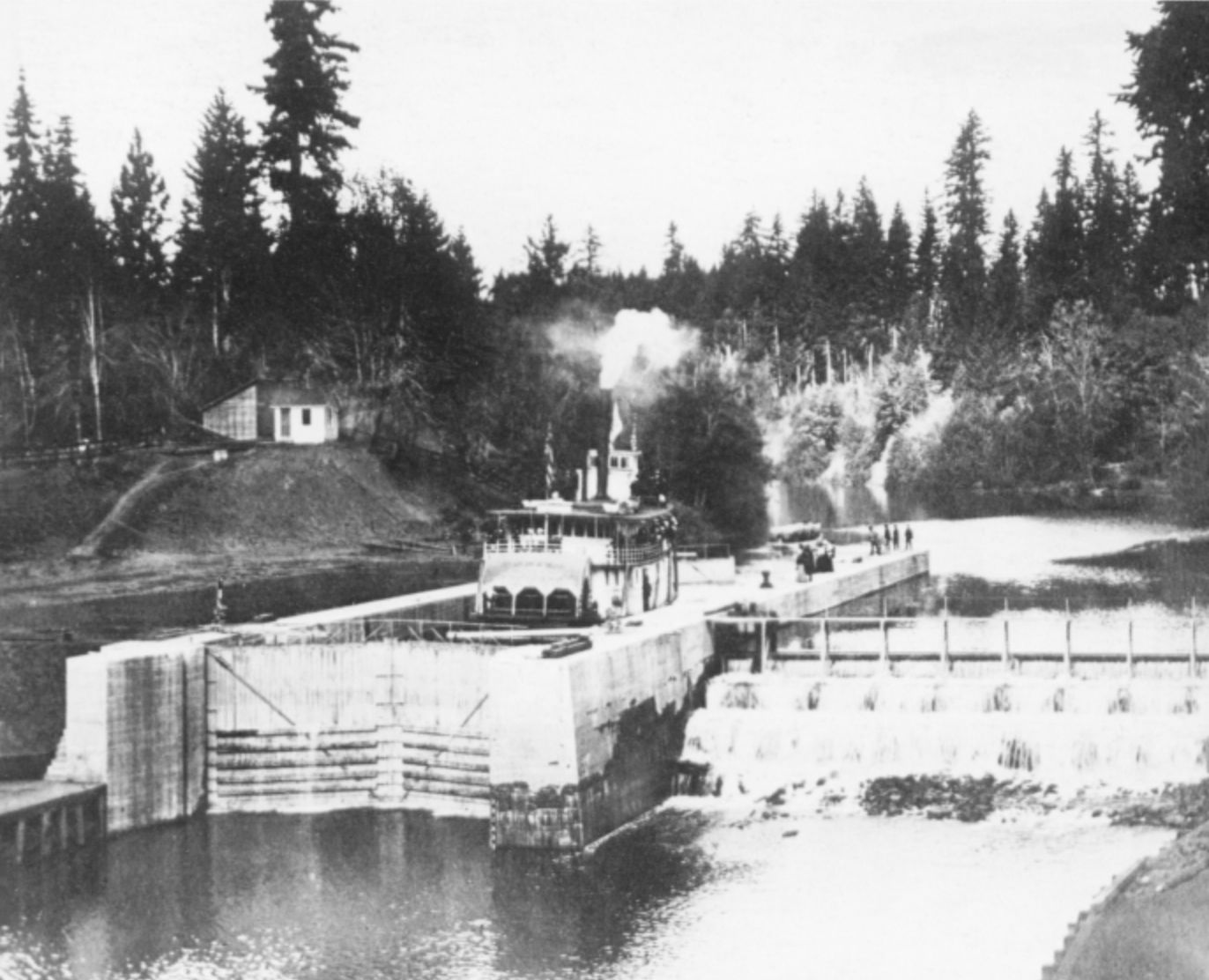
- Steamer Bonita in Yamhill Lock, September 24, 1900

- Location within Oregon
- Country: USA
- Location: Lafayette, Oregon
- Coordinates: 45°13′50″N 123°06′15″W
- Purpose: navigation
- Status: Decommissioned
- Construction began: 1898
- Opening date: September 22, 1900
- Demolition date: circa 1965
- Construction cost: $72,164.83
- Operator: Corps of Engineers

Dam and spillways
- Type of dam: Timber-crib stone-filled
- Impounds: Yamhill River
- Height (foundation): 26 feet (7.92 m)
- Length: 125 feet (38.10 m)
- Width (base): 30 feet (9.14 m)
- Spillways: one
- Spillway type: Stepped.

Reservoir
- Maximum length: 9 miles (14 km)
- Maximum water depth: 16 feet (4.88 m)
- Yamhill River Lock and Dam
- U.S. National Register of Historic Places
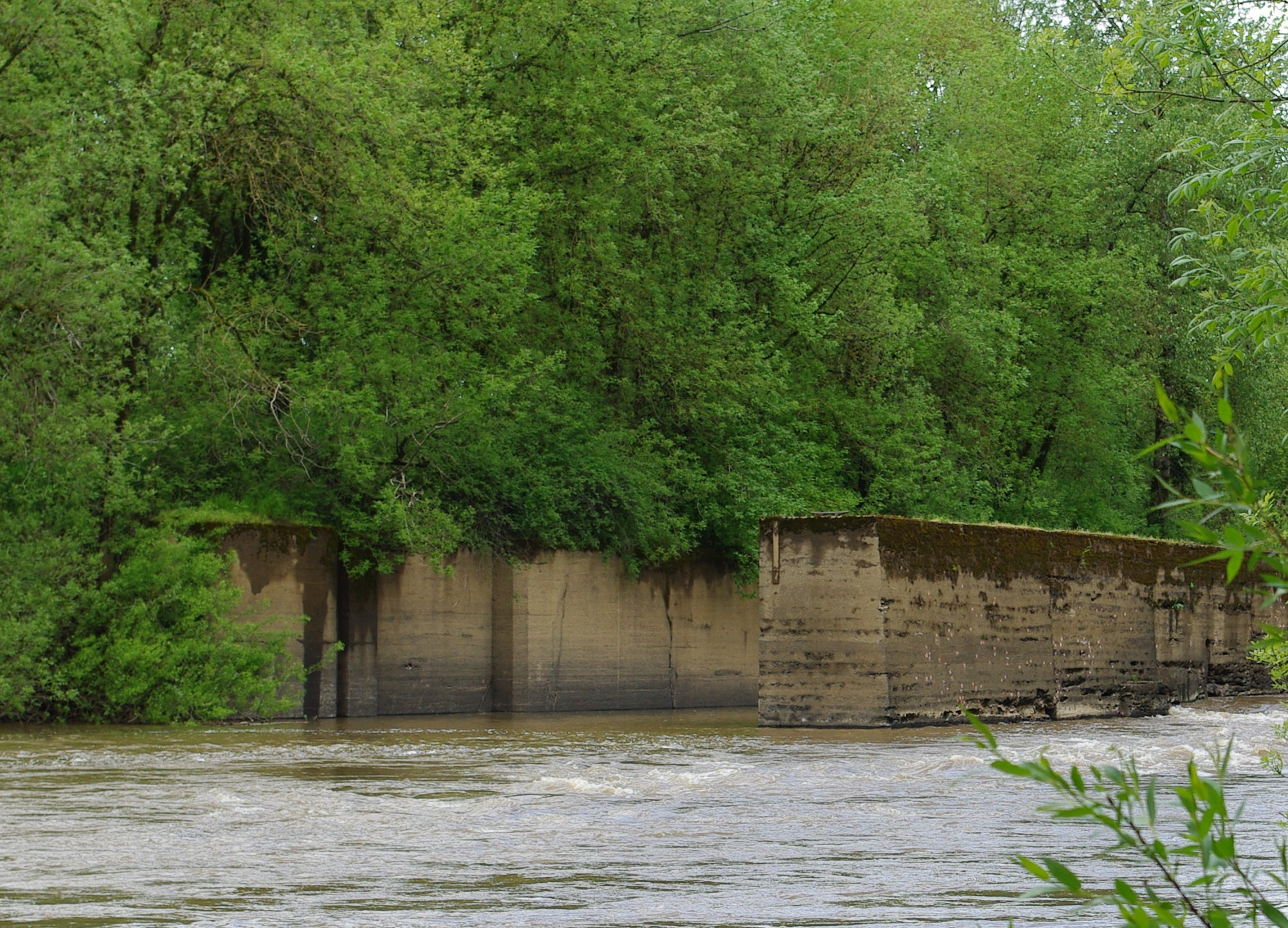
- Lock walls and downriver entrance, May, 2009
- Area: 8 acres (3.2 ha)
- Architect: US Army Corps of Engineers; Normile, Fastabend & McGregor
- NRHP reference No.: 91000799
- Added to NRHP: June 21, 1991

The Yamhill River lock and dam was completed in 1900. It was built near Lafayette, Oregon, to allow better river transport on the Yamhill River from Dayton, to McMinnville, Oregon. While the Corps of Engineers had recommended against construction of the lock, it was built anyway, largely as a result of political effort by the backers of the project. For almost forty years prior to the lock construction there had been efforts made to construct a lock and dam on the Yamhill River.

The lock was a single-lift chamber 210 feet (64 m) long and 40 feet (12 m) wide, located on the west side of the river. The dam extended from the east bank of the river to the eastern lock wall, and when the lock gates were shut, acted to back up the Yamhill river and raise the water level sufficiently to allow ready steamboat navigation to McMinnville during the summer dry season. During the winter, the lock and dam were more of an obstruction than a navigational aid, as they were frequently overtopped by freshets and floods, sometimes as high as or higher than twenty feet above the lock walls.

The lock ceased to be used in any significant way soon after it was built. There was an upsurge in use of the river during the 1930s and 1940s primary for transport of logs. The lock continued in operation until the 1950s, when the U.S. government concluded that the little amount of traffic on the river no longer justified the expense.

The lock and dam were then turned over to Yamhill County. The county lacked the funds to maintain or restore the lock, and the dam, having been viewed as a barrier to spawning salmon, was eventually destroyed with use of explosives. The lock walls remain to this day. The lock keeper's residence, built at the same time, and now in private hands, also remains. A county park is nearby from which the lock structure can be viewed. Some other remains of the work, such as pilings, are also visible at low water.

While not particularly remarkable as an engineering project, the lock was one of only three lock and dam projects commenced in Oregon and indeed in all of the Pacific Coast states by the United States government during the 19th century.

The lock and dam are also representative of the results of local pressure for expenditure of funds from the national government for works of a local nature. A substantial portion of the project remains visible to this day, and has been said to be "one of the last tangible remnants in the Upper Willamette Valley of a time when river navigation played an important role in transporting freight and passengers."

The lock is sometimes referred to as the Lafayette Lock. The Lafayette Locks Park, maintained by Yamhill County, Oregon now occupies the site of the old lock and dam.

== Location ==
The lock was (and is) located about one mile downriver from the town of Lafayette and about five miles upriver from the confluence of the Yamhill and the Willamette Rivers. The fall of the Yamhill river between McMinnville and the lock was 13 feet (4.0 m). The river in its natural state had a stretch of rapids running from Lafayette, which was originally called Yamhill Falls, downriver to the lock site, over which the river fell nine feet.

The source of the Yamhill River was the Coast Range in Oregon. The river flows to the east about 45 miles (72 km), to a point about 40 miles (64 km) upriver from Portland, Oregon, where it joins the Willamette River. Light-draft steamboats routinely ran to Dayton, about five miles above the river's mouth. The town of Lafayette was about 8 miles (13 km) up from the river mouth.

At Lafayette there was a stretch of rapids over which the river fell 8.8 feet (2.7 m) in 1 mile (1.6 km). From the foot of the rapids to the mouth of the river the fall was just 1 foot (0.30 m). High water in the Yamhill River, or a rise of 10 feet (3.0 m) in the Willamette River would submerge the rapids.

From Lafayette the river ran about 9 miles (14 km) to McMinnville, the seat of Yamhill County, a prosperous agricultural region. This stretch of the river was from 40 to 100 feet (12 to 30 m) wide, and obstructed with snags and overhanging trees. The snags were particularly bad for a stretch running from McMinnville 3 miles (4.8 km) down river. If the snags and overhanging trees were removed, steamboats drawing 2.5 to 3.0 feet (0.76 to 0.91 m) of water could proceed to McMinnville. The season in which boats could pass over the rapids was limited to about five months a year.

In December 1892 there had been no preparation at all for use of the river to ship products by water. No roads led to the river, and there were no storehouses on the banks. There seemed to be very little interest taken in the recent clearance of the river. One steamer regularly ran the whole year between Portland and Dayton, and made a good business. This steamer could have extended its route to McMinnville if there had been sufficient business on the river to make it worthwhile.

In 1892, a rail line crossed the Yamhill river at McMinnville and at LaFayette, which were only 5 miles (8.0 km) apart by wagon road. Lafayette and Dayton were only 2 miles (3.2 km) apart by road, and all of the country was flat.

In 1910, the Yamhill river was described as "a limpid stream of shallows and deeps in Summer, a brawling torrent in Winter." In 1874, the Yamhill was examined by the engineering department of the U.S. army, which found that the river would vary from a shallow chain of pools in the summer to a "river of great power and strength" whose waterlines along the banks showed a rise, sometimes, of over 60 feet (18 m) during winter and spring floods.

== Steam navigation to McMinnville before the lock ==
Prior to the construction of the lock, small steamers were able to run to McMinnville. The very early steamers Enterprise (115 ft.)and Hoosier (50 ft; 5 tons) operated up river from the place, known then as Martin's Landing, that was later selected to build the dam. The steamer Elk, 60 short tons (54 t), owned by Christopher E. Switzer, also ran on the Yamhill in the late 1850s but after a single season proved to be too large for the route.

In 1867, the People's Transportation Company advertised freight service to McMinnville at a rate of $7.00 per ton. In 1871, the Willamette Transportation Company advertised steamer service to McMinnville at the rate of $3.00 per ton from Portland.

In March 1895, the steamer Toledo (128 ft; 226 tons) made regular trips to McMinnville. Toledo appears to have been the first steamer to reach McMinnville in 14 years. In November 1896, the steamer Gypsy (101 ft.; 213 tons) was placed temporarily on the Portland-McMinnville route.

== Early lock proposals ==
Starting even before Oregon became a state, there were five local efforts to build a lock or locks on the Yamhill river. In 1858, the Oregon Argus urged Yamhill County to construct a lock at the mouth of the Yamhill River to allow year-round navigation on the river. The State Rights Democrat, then a partisan newspaper, blamed the failure to construct the locks on Republican domination of politics in Yamhill County.

On January 17, 1859, before Oregon was formally admitted to statehood, Christopher E. Switzer, owner of the steamer Elk filed an act with the territorial government to incorporate the Yamhill Water-Lock and Dam Company, which, with capital stock at the stated value of $50,000, proposed to build a lock at the mouth of the Yamhill sufficient to accommodate a vessel 60 short tons (54 t) in size, which was the same tonnage as the Elk.

On December 27, 1869, the Yamhill Locks and Transportation Company was incorporated. The company's capital stock was stated to be $75,000. With its main office in McMinnville, the company's purpose, as stated in its articles of incorporation, was to build locks at the mouth of the Yamhill and at the rapids at Lafayette. A dam was built at the mouth of the Yamhill, but this was washed out by a flood in November, 1871.

Other concerns were incorporated for lock construction, including the Yamhill Lock and Transportation Company, formed by a group of Lafayette businessmen on February 17, 1872. In October 1874, articles of incorporation were filed by five persons for the Yamhill River Improvement Company, which, with capital stock of $50,000 divided into shares of $50 each, had the purpose of improving navigation in the Yamhill river, by locks, dams, flumes, cuts and dredging, and also to run steamboats and build warehouses and wharfs. In October 1876 the Yamhill Locks and Manufacturing Company was incorporated. None of these companies were able to build, or apparently even start to build, a lock on the river.

== Legislative action ==
=== State legislation ===
The Oregon state legislature passed a law in 1876 which created a "franchise" to provide for the construction of locks on the Yamhill river at Lafayette. Under the terms of the franchise, the state reserved the right to purchase the improvement at any time.

=== Federal legislation ===
A provision of the Rivers and Harbors Act, passed on July 13, 1892, required the Corps of Engineers to prepare a preliminary examination of the possibility of developing slackwater navigation from the mouth of the Yamhill River to McMinnville, by building a lock and dam at Lafayette. The same rivers and harbors act permitted $3,000 in funds to be expended to remove the snags, overhanging trees and other obstructions on the Yamhill river between Lafayette and McMinnville. With this money, these obstructions were cleared in October and November 1892.

In early December 1892, Maj. Thomas H. Handbury (1841-1915) of the Corps of Engineers went along the route in a skiff and found it in "very good boating" condition, with the river about 12 feet (3.7 m) above the low water level. At this water level, Handbury reported "the falls and rapids at Lafayette were entirely obliterated."

Given the apparently adequate road, rail, and riverine transport situation, Major Handbury, who prepared the 1892 report, concluded that construction of a lock and dam at Lafayette was not important enough to the federal government for it to be funded and built. Handbury's superiors in the chain of command at the War Department concurred with him, and passed their recommendations against the project on to Congress.

On May 13, 1896, the Rivers and Harbors bill passed in the U.S. Senate. It authorized expenditure of $200,000 for navigation improvements to the Willamette River and construction of the lock on the Yamhill River. Only $40,000 was actually appropriated by the legislation. Congressman Thomas H. Tongue was involved in securing the financing for the project.

The War Department had determined not to build the lock on the Yamhill. U.S. Representative Binger Hermann was a strong proponent of the project, claiming that increased navigation on the Yamhill would pay for the entire project within one year of its completion. Other political pressure was applied in favor of construction of the lock and dam. The lock project was also favored by Harvey W. Scott, editor of the largest newspaper in the state, the Morning Oregonian.

On November 12, 1897, the Daily Capital Journal, of Salem, Oregon, reported having received a telegram from U.S. Senator George W. McBride that the lock would be built as designed by the engineering department and that the necessary appropriations would be expended by act of Congress. Also in November 1897, Brigadier General John M. Wilson informed by letter the Yamhill County commissioners that Congress had appropriated $160,000 in addition to the previous $40,000, thus providing enough money to construct the lock and dam.

== Construction ==
=== Bids solicited ===
On January 3, 1898, Capt. W.L. Fisk, U.S. Engineers posted a notice soliciting sealed proposals for construction of a dam and other works on the Yamhill river. Proposals would be accepted at the U.S. Engineer office in Portland, Oregon until noon, February 10, 1898. On February 11, 1898 there were six bids, of which the lowest, $59,918 was from the Astoria partnership of Simon Normile, John Anton Fastabend (c1860-1942), and William F. McGregor. The contract was award to the Normile concern and entered into on March 11, 1898.

The contract required the project to be finished by December 31, 1898. The site for the project had not yet been purchased by the government, and the contract stated that no work was to be done until the government notified the contractor of the acquisition, after which construction was to begin within 10 days. Certain portions of the project, including the lock keeper's dwelling, woodsheds, walks and fences, were to be completed within 60 days after the contractor's receiving the notification.

The Normile firm expected to begin the work about two weeks after receiving the award. Most of the construction would be of concrete, mixed from stone taken from within 2 miles (3.2 km) of the project. Construction materials consisting of 500,000 board feet of lumber and about 60,000 pounds (27,000 kg) of iron would be shipped from Astoria. Columbia Iron Works, apparently a subcontractor, received the contract for the iron work for the project.

=== Construction begins ===
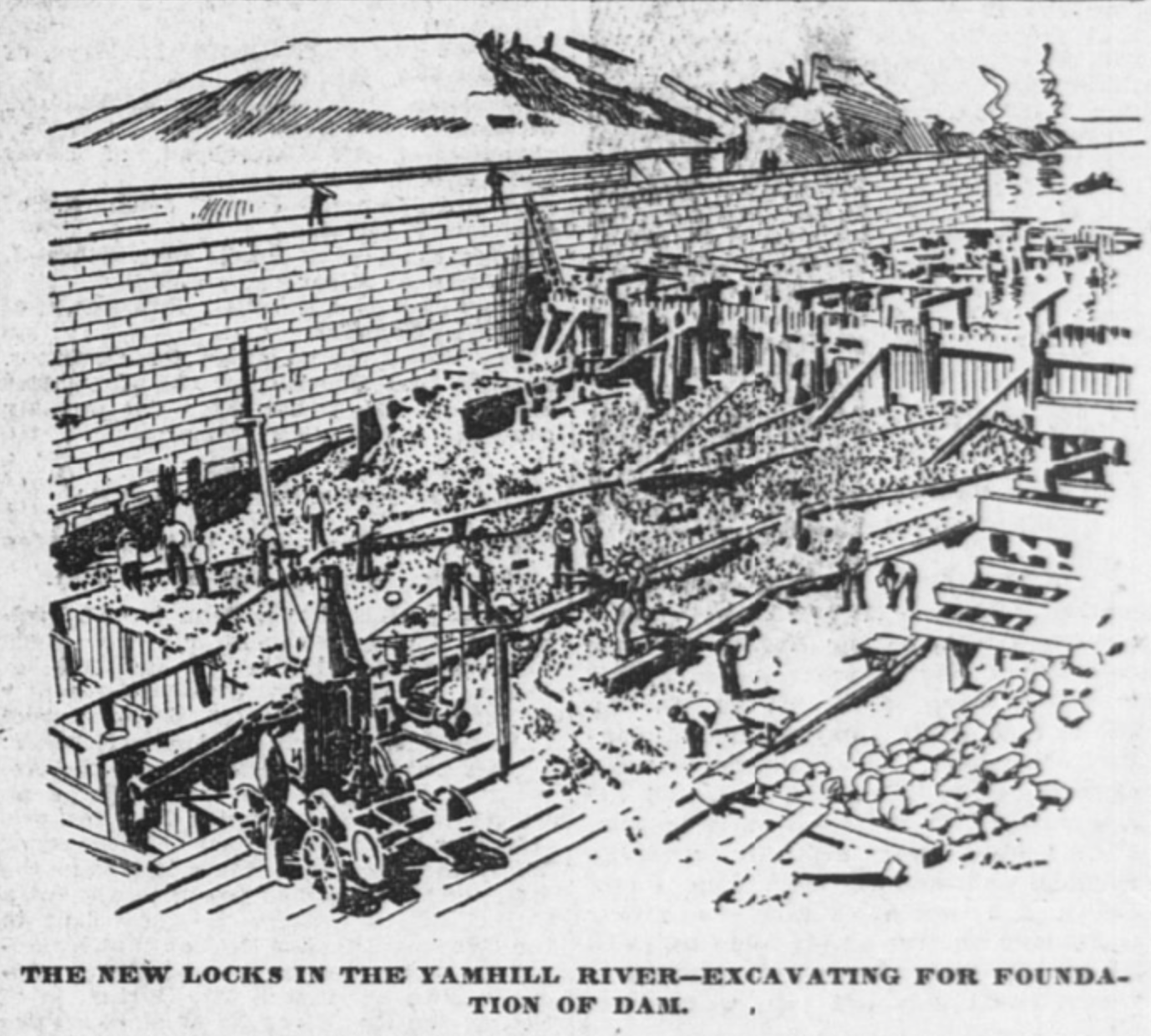
Sketch showing work being done on the foundation for the dam.

On April 8, 1898, the government purchased the land for the project from its owners, O.N. and Gertrude J. Denny, for $275. On June 14, 1898, the contractors were given the notification to proceed. Some work on the keeper's dwelling had already begun, on May 12, 1898. The location had originally been known as Martin's Landing.

Other work had already begun, including the assembly of materials and the employment of labor.

On the evening of April 20, 1898, the contractors arrived in Lafayette and began arrangements to start work. A labor force would start right away to build a boarding house and a scow. The project site was covered with heavy tree growth, and would need to be cleared off. After this, the rock and timber would be delivered to the work site. This preliminary work was expected to take two to three weeks.

The outbreak of Spanish-American War on April 21, 1898 caused an increase in the price of labor and materials.

The deadline for completion was extended twice, first to November 1, 1899, and second, because of what the Corps of Engineers described as "failure of the contractors to complete the work", to October 1, 1900.

As of June 20, 1898, fifty men and teams were working, and the contractor expected the project to be complete before high water in the fall. On July 21, 1898 only twenty men were at work, with one hundred to be employed as soon as the preparation work was complete. By this time the contractor was hoping, rather than expecting, to finish by the fall rains.

On Tuesday, August 9, 1898, the concrete contractor, John Crawford, said that the work would be pushed henceforward and that a 40-horsepower boiler and steam engine were to be in place to operate the concrete mixer and other equipment. Two work gangs would be placed on the project, one by day and one by night. Part of the plan was to install an electric light plant if one could be found at a reasonable cost. Crawford said it would take about 60 days to finish the work.

As of November 18, 1898, work on the inshore concrete wall was complete, and work on the outer wall had begun. The work was moving as fast as possible so as to finish before severe winter weather arrived. Work on the locks was suspended on November 30, 1898 because of high water on the river.

On Tuesday, October 3, 1899, the gates on the lock were installed and properly adjusted, the valves in place, and the miter sills (under the lock gates) fitted and finishing touches placed on the lock. Pilings had been driven on the shore end of the permanent dam, as well as for the revetment to protect the riverbank from erosion above and below the dam. The river was routed through the lock so that work on the permanent dam could be completed.

On October 6, 1899, it was reported that the cofferdam at the site had washed out a second time, possibly delaying completion of the project.

Steamers were running on the river during construction. On November 13, 1899, the steamer Gypsy passed the lock at noon, then, returning after dark, at 6:13 p.m, struck the lock and dam broadside, damaging the works.

Lock completion had been intended for 1899, but five freshets on the Yamhill river prevented this. The Yamhill river stayed high later than usual, and when the fall rains came, the cofferdam was washed away, so work had to be suspended until lower water and better weather arrived in 1900.

=== Litigation ===
In February 1900, the contractors, McGregor & Normile, had sued Portland resident George Taylor, for breach of contract in supplying cement, claiming damages of $1,537.50. The allegations of the complaint were that in March 1898, Taylor contracted with McGregor & Normile to deliver to them about 7400 barrels of Jossen cement for use on the lock and dam project at a price of $2.50 per barrel. Jossen cement was a type of Portland cement manufactured in Belgium.

McGregor & Normile claimed Taylor had delivered 2000 barrels, and promised them that more barrels were en route from Europe on the ocean-going steamer City of Athens. Although 6,000 barrels were shipped to Taylon on City of Athens, Taylor delivered only 1,540 barrels to McGregor & Normile, and sold the rest of the barrels to other parties. As a result, McGregor & Nichols had to buy 2,460 barrels of cement at the increased price of $3.12.5 per barrel.

They sought to recover the difference, 75 cents per barrel, from the Taylor. The case was tried to a jury in Multnomah County before Judge McBride. A verdict was expected to be reached on February 21, 1900. At 5:30 p.m on February 21, 1900, the jury returned a verdict for the plaintiffs, McGregor & Normile, and awarded damages of $912.50.

=== Completion ===
As of July 1, 1900, the lock walls, gates, valves and other equipment were complete; the timber revetments and the grading of the banks on the west side of the river were three-quarters complete, and the piling of the main dam (then still under construction) was one-third complete. Work had not yet started on the crib section of the main dam, and the revetments, embankments, and bank protection on the east side.

On August 1, 1900, cofferdams were completed above and below the main dam crib section, and the river's entire flow was channeled through the lock chamber. After that work commenced on the soapstone foundation for the dam. The entire dam was completed on September 1, 1900.

On September 15, 1900, the lock chamber was closed, and the river began to back up behind the dam. Four days later, on September 19, the water began spilling over the dam.

== Opening of the locks ==
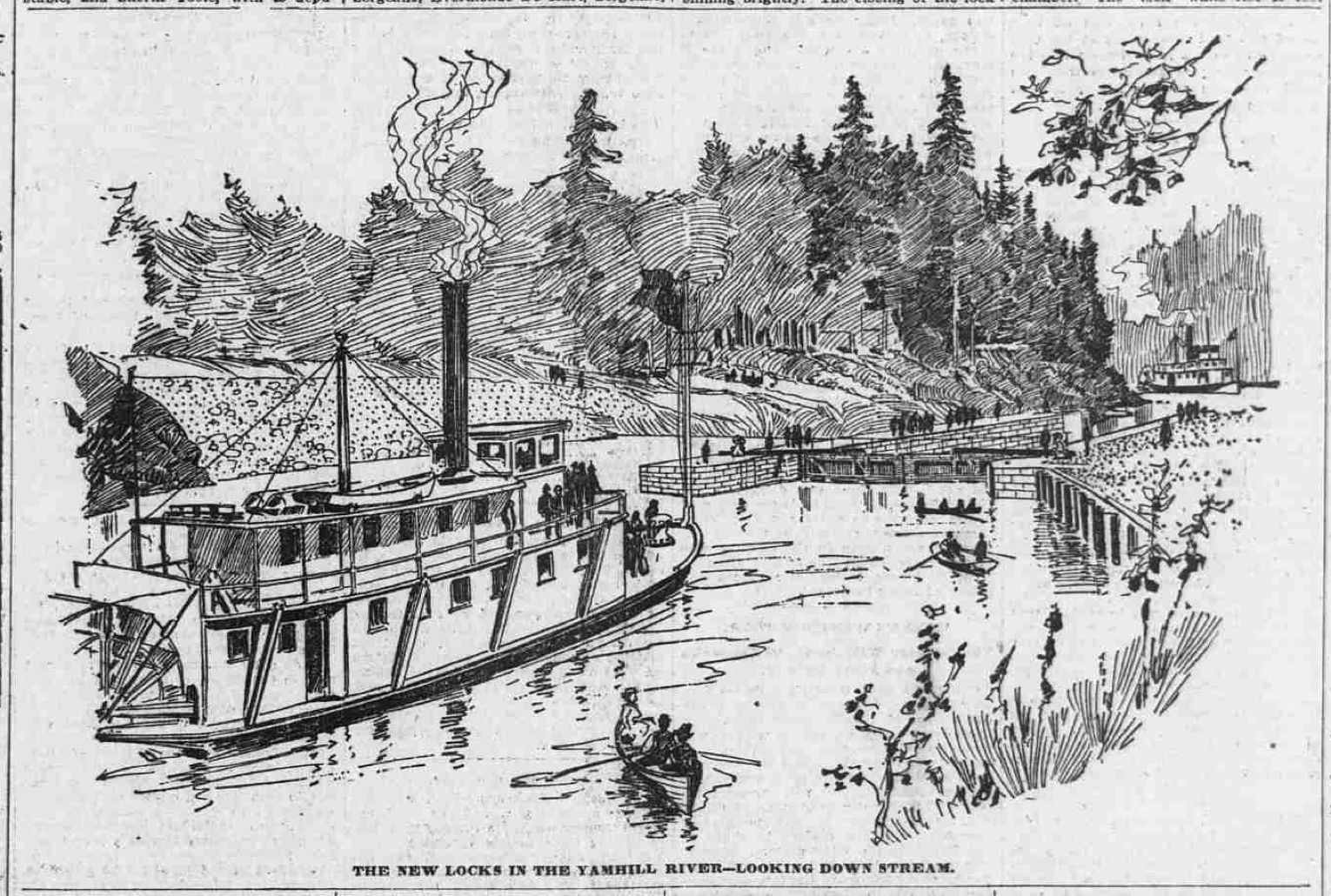
The locks in operation, as imagined by a sketch artist in 1900.

On September 21, 1900, the lock was working perfectly, filling in six and one-half minutes and emptying in three and one-half. The total cost of construction was $72,164.83. That day Capt. Wm C. Langfitt inspected and informally opened the lock for operations.

At 1:00 p.m., the government's steam launch, with Captain Langfitt at the wheel, entered the lock, with assistant engineer David B. Ogden, Mrs. Ogden, and a reporter from the Oregonian on board. Ten minutes later, the launch had been raised to the upper river level and departed towards McMinnville, which due to the river's winding course, was 10 miles (16 km) away, twice as far as overland. The launch reached McMinnville a few minutes before the train bound for Portland. After an exchange of greetings with McMinnville's prominent citizens who had come to witness the arrival of the launch, Captain Langfitt and the reporter took the train back to Portland.

Assistant Engineer D.B. Ogden returned downstream to the lock, to prepare it for the official handing over to the government from the contractors, which was to occur on October 1, 1900. All the work during fiscal year 1901 was supervised by engineer Ogden.

All the work under the contract was deemed complete on September 22, 1900, and the government formally accepted the works, which were formally opened to navigation two days later, on September 24. The Morning Oregonian praised the completion of the work, saying that "from this time forward 'boats will run the year round between Portland and McMinnville', with plenty of water to insure quick and safe transit of freight."

== Dimensions upon completion ==
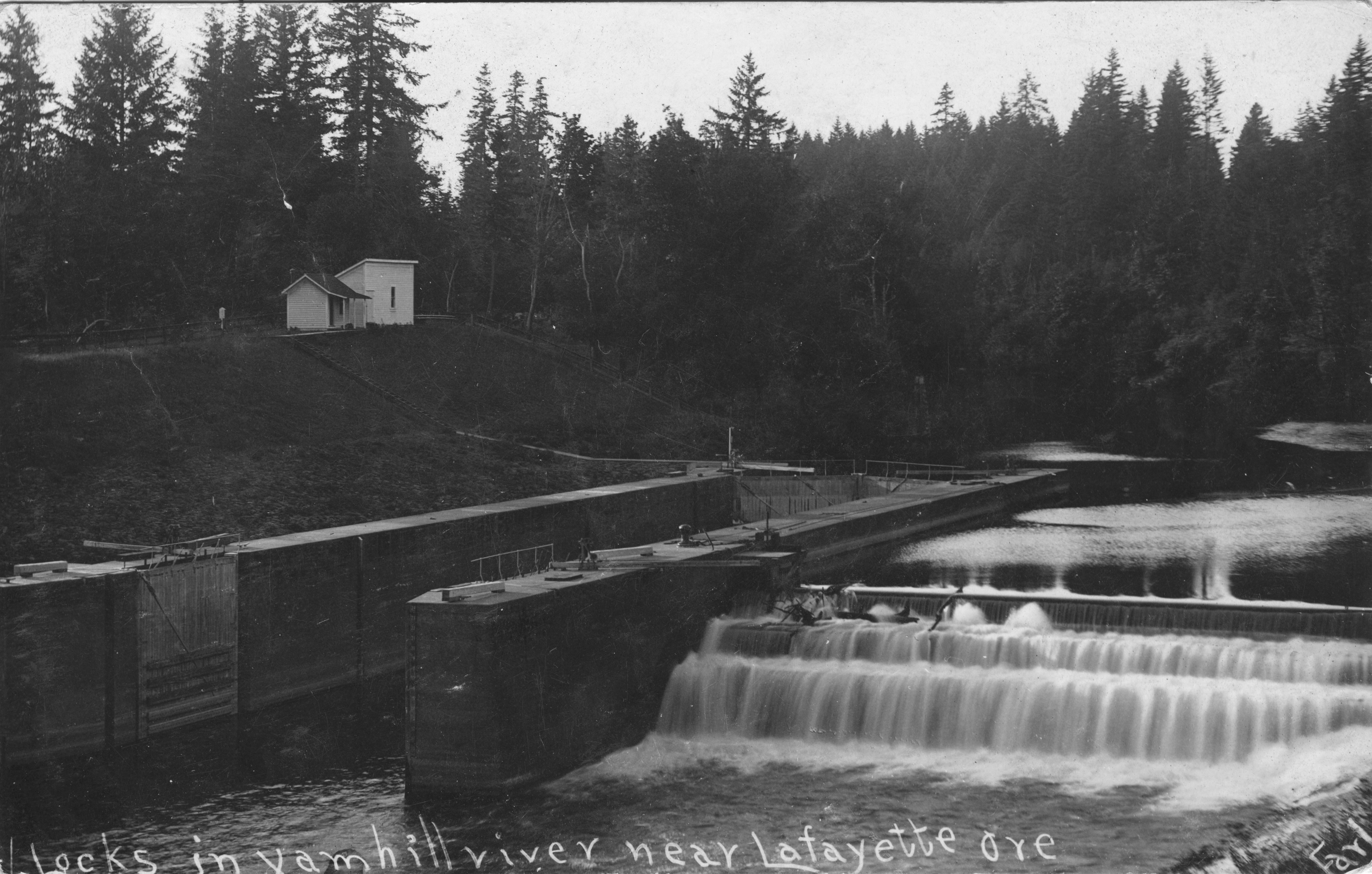
Completed Yamhill lock and dam.

The overall length of the lock was 275 feet (84 m), and the distance between the gates was 210 feet (64 m). The lock was 40 feet (12 m) wide. There was 4 feet (1.2 m) depth of water over the lock sills, so that any boat that could pass the Willamette Falls Locks could also transit the new lock on the Yamhill.

The land wall was 12 feet (3.7 m) thick at its base, and 8 feet (2.4 m) thick at the top. The river wall was 12 feet (3.7 m) thick from top to bottom. The lower lock gates were 25 by 25 feet (7.6 by 7.6 m), and each weighed 15 short tons (14 t). The upper gates measured 9 by 25 feet (2.7 by 7.6 m), and weighed 9 short tons (8.2 t) each.

There were no valves in the upper gates. The lock chamber was filled by culverts in the lock walls measuring 3 by 6 feet (0.91 by 1.83 m). The culverts were opened and closed by vertical butterfly valves. The lower gages had horizontal butterfly valves 2 by 4 feet (0.61 by 1.22 m) in size which were used for emptying the lock chamber.

The lock floor and the lock walls rested on a poured concrete foundation four feet thick, with the lock walls rising 26 feet (7.9 m) above it. The lock floor was also 4 feet (1.2 m) thick. The sub foundation consisted of a timber grillage placed on 700 round piles, driven 30 to 50 feet (9.1 to 15.2 m) feet deep. 8000 cubic yards of concrete were used for the lock and foundation. The lock had a lift of 16 feet (4.9 m).

The dam impounding the Yamhill River was 125 feet (38 m) long and 30 feet (9.1 m) wide at its base. The dam rose in steps, and was constructed from 100,000 board feet of timber and 1400 cubic yards of rock.

The lock keeper's office was on the west side of the river on a hill above the river's high water mark. The highest water level recorded on the Yamhill River within the three years before the lock completion was 34.5 feet (10.5 m), which would have risen 13.5 feet (4.1 m) over the lock walls. The lock keeper's residence was on the east side of the river, also located above the high water mark. A collapsible iron bridge allowed crossing the lock at any ordinary water level in the river.

== Post-completion flood countermeasures ==
There were ten freshets on the Yamhill river from November 1900 to April 1901. The river banks next to the lock and dam turned out to be much less stable then had been planned for, and the river conditions much worse than anticipated. After a December freshet, a 40 feet (12 m) long portion of a riprap protected section fell into the river, and the dam was being threatened with undermining by scour. This was counteracted by depositing 150 square yards (130 m^{2}) of rock in front of the dam and at the foot of the slope.

The third freshet in December 1900 overtopped the lock walls by 10 feet (3.0 m) and scoured out a channel that was about 25 feet (7.6 m) wide and 9 feet (2.7 m) deep running all along the land side of the west lock wall. This section had been finished too late in the season to be protected with turf.

From January 12 to 19, 1901, the highest rise in the Yamhill River since 1894 occurred, with the water fully 25 feet (7.6 m) over the lock walls. Had the water come solely down the Yamhill, there would have been a "disastrous scour" accompanying the river's rise and fall, but because the Willamette River also was flooding, the current in the Yamhill was slowed down.

Additional damage was caused by a freshet in February which carried water 11 feet (3.4 m) over the lock falls, and other freshets in March and April which overtopped the lock walls, but not as high as the one in February.

During the low water season of 1901, the Corps of Engineers proposed to spend $26,160 to extend the concrete wing wall at the head of the lock, regrade slopes, replace and extend riprap protection, and increase the stone filling at the base of the dam. In early July 1901, the Corps of Engineers, with D.B. Ogden in charge, had 50 men at work sloping and laying stone on the banks above the lock to protect them from erosion during floods, as had recently occurred. The work was finished by November 1901.

About 50,000 square feet (4,600 m^{2}) of the slopes had been paved and rip-rapped with rock, and the dam had been extended 25 feet (7.6 m) on further on to the east back of river. The slopes above the rip-rap had been lessened and seeded with grass. This was thought to be sufficient to withstand future floods. Construction work went on while boats were transiting the locks. On December 6, 1901, the work on the locks was reported to be finally complete and ready to withstand winter weather.

== Operation from 1900 to 1902 ==
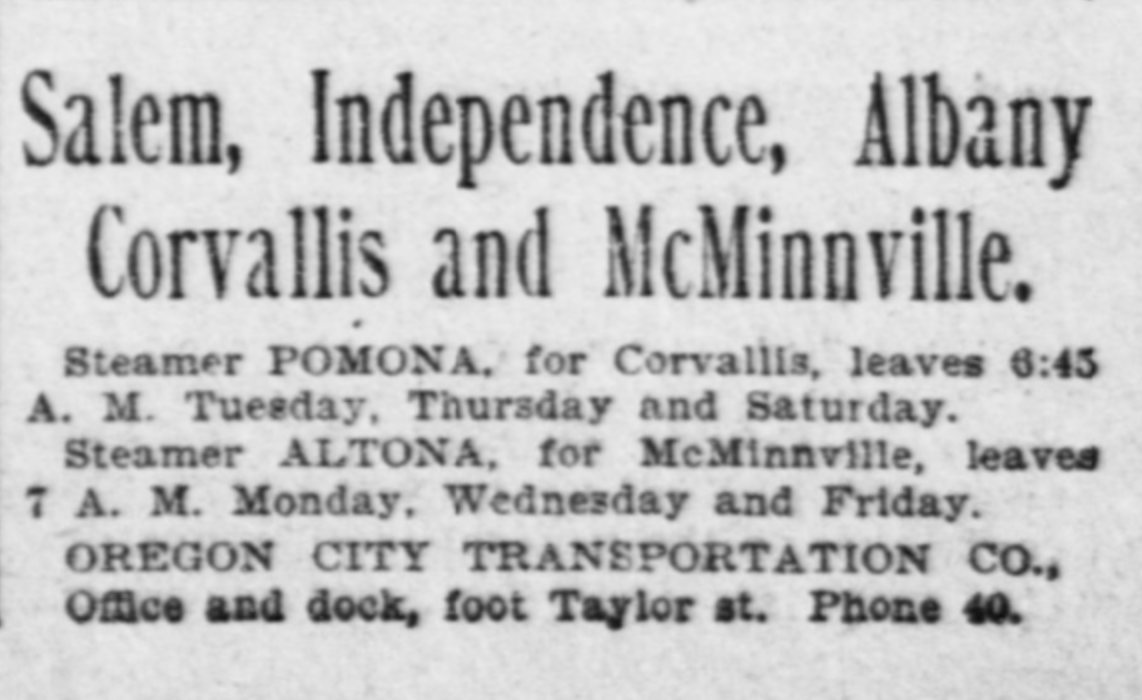
Advertisement placed January 6, 1902 for steamer service to points on the Willamette and Yamhill rivers, including McMinnville, which would have required use of the Yamhill lock.

On September 24, 1900, the steamer Bonita (later renamed Metlako), became the first steamboat to transit the lock. From the formal opening to navigation on September 24, 1900 to the end of the fiscal year, on June 30, 1901, the lock was in operation for 202 days and closed, because of high water, for 78 days. There were 225 lockages. Total operating time was 67 hours and 32 minutes. Total registered tons transiting the locks was 38,967. The total freight carried was 1,742 tons. Total passengers carried were 2,010.

In November 1901, steamboats were reported to be running regularly between Portland and McMinnville, running upriver one day and down the next, loaded to capacity with grain. One steamboat making the run, in November 1901, was the Altona, which then ran three times weekly from Portland to McMinnville.

On January 6, 1902, the Oregon City Transportation Company, also known as the "Yellow Stack Line" advertised regular service, on the steamer Altona from Portland to McMinnville. Altona was scheduled to depart from Portland to McMinnville at 7:00 a.m. every Monday, Wednesday, and Friday, from the company's dock at the foot of Taylor Street in Portland.

On January 8, 1902, the water in the Yamhill River had risen too high to permit navigation. The sternwheel steamer Altona which had just resumed the run from Portland to McMinnville after a hiatus of about three weeks, was forced to proceed no further than Dayton on the Yamhill River.

The previous suspension of service by Altona had been due to lack of business. With no steamer service, the merchants of Dayton and McMinnville began considering building their own steamer. Captain Graham, of the Oregon City Transportation Company, the owner of Altona, conferred with the merchants and explained his position. The merchants agreed that they would provide sufficient business and Captain Graham agreed to keep Altona on the McMinnville run.

During fiscal year 1902, there were 246 lockages transiting 48,240 registered tonnage of vessels, carrying 3,455 tons of freight, including 571 tons of sand and gravel shipped in to repair the locks. The railroads lowered their rates to compete, and kept most of the shipping business.

In 1902, despite the agreement of the merchants to patronize the steamers, the Oregon City Transportation Company withdrew their steamers permanently from service above Dayton. This was said by the company to have been because the difficulties in predicting when the lock would be open during the winter months made it impossible to build up business. Although efforts were made later to establish steamboat service to McMinnville, this withdrawal by the Oregon City Transportation Company marked the end of regular commercial steamboat use of the lock, even though it was to help establish that service that the lock had been built and completed just two years before.

== Newspapers criticize project as waste of money ==
We call the attention of business men and citizens of McMlnnvllle, that the editor of the Herald, at tho time the damn, damned (we do not use this in a profane way. but in Its true meaning) Yamhill locks were constructed, advocated the construction of an electric line from that city to Dayton, and predicted that the locks would give no relief In traffic to the people of McMlnnvllle. Which has proved correct. Not that the government engineers under whose supervision the locks were constructed did not do good work; we heard those say, who ought to know, that the work was first class. Now, gentlemen, while you are waiting for that boat to run up to your city, and the S. P. Co. to build that extension from LaFayette to our city, "got In' with your sleeves rolled up. and assist In building an electric line from your city to Newberg, via LaFayette and Dayton to Salem. It will pay.

— The Daily Journal
Salem, Oregon
June 25, 1903

In late May 1903, the government had several men and teams working that the locks, performing grading, sowing grass seed and performing other improvements. By this time, the lack of use of the lock had become apparent. Noting this, the editor of the Hillsboro Independent added the comment: "But you wanted the locks, did you not?" In June 1903, the Hillsboro Independent reported talk of closing the locks at Lafayette because there was not enough river traffic.

Again, the Hillsboro Independent commented sarcastically: "The improvement seems not to have revolutionized the transportation of freight out of Yamhill county." In the same month, another newspaper, the Daily Journal, from Salem, was critical of the decision to build the locks and their apparently uselessness.

In June 1903, a raft of ash logs about 900 feet long transited the Yamhill locks bound for a saw mill at New Era. According to steamboat men, possibly only a single steamer had passed through the locks to that point in 1903. Commenting, the Oregon City Courier said the locks were "useless to navigation, and according to these same steamboat men, at high water the locks are flooded and an obstruction. There is practically no navigation of the Yamhill river above Dayton. The $93,000 spend by Uncle Sam — to keep republican votes in line it seems — was worse than wasted. The railroad is preferred to the tortuous Yamhill."

In October, 1910, the Morning Oregonian, once a proponent of the project, criticized the lock and dam for not having brought navigability to the Yamhill river.

== Contractor attempts to recover excess costs ==
In 1905, a bill was introduced in the Congress by Sen. Charles W. Fulton, to pay the general contractors (Simon Normile, John F. Fastabend, and William F. McGregor) $30,000, reportedly for "losses sustained by the delay of the government in securing title to a site for the Yamhill locks." On January 5, 1905 the senate referred the matter to the Court of Claims. The claim involved more than delay, as the chief issue was whether the United States should have to pay, under the terms of the contract, for extra work associated with the construction of temporary diversion works through the lock chamber while the adjacent dam was under construction. The contractors won in the Court of Claims, but the government appealed to the United States States Supreme Court.

The Supreme Court, in an opinion by Justice Oliver Wendell Holmes Jr., reversed the court of claims, ruling for the government, and finding that the extra cost and expense was chargeable to the contractor, as the government had only directed the general result of what was to be attained by the contract and leaving the details up to the contractors as to how to perform the work.

== Design failure ==
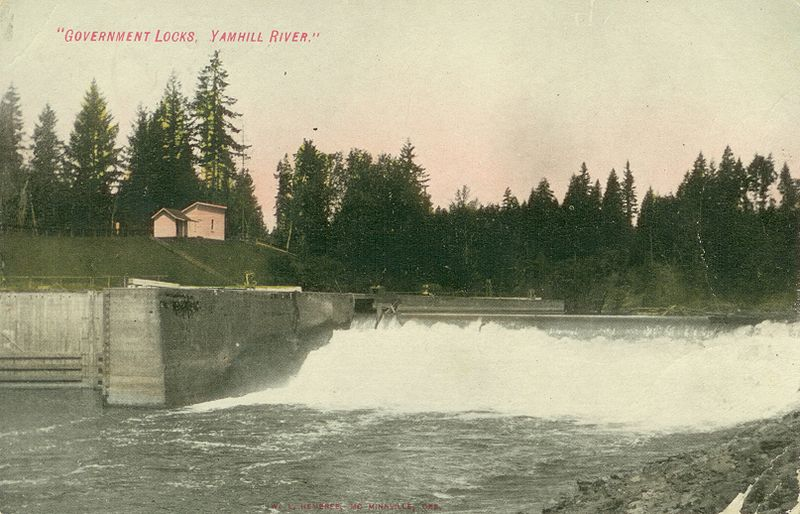
Colorized postcard printed 1908 or before, showing Yamhill lock and dam. Lock office is visible on left.

After 1902, the official reports of the Corps of Engineers consistently emphasized that no commercial steamers were regularly using the lock. The lock had been "practically abandoned" by sternwheelers after 1902. From 1902 to 1914 the locks were used mostly by passengers in launches and by boats towing rafts.

The serious flaw with the lock and dam was that the lock had to be closed at high water, because the river simply flowed over the lock walls, making the lock chamber unusable. On the Willamette River, high water, usually coming in the fall and spring, was traditionally the best steamboat time, with late summer and early fall the worst, with water levels down. On the Yamhill above Lafayette, the dam created the reverse situation.

The original design of the lock had assumed that steamers could simply float over the dam when the water level rose to 5 feet above the dam. In practice this proved impossible because until the water rose to 12 feet (3.7 m) above the dam, the drop between the upper and lower pools was too great to permit safe passage of a steamer.

In 1903, several proposals were made to address the issue, but they were rejected as being impractical, too expensive, or both.

== Later operations ==
=== 1903 to 1910 ===
On December 31, 1902, heavy rains caused the Yamhill River to rise very fast, and by that date the water was 5 feet (1.5 m) over the lock walls. In late January 1903, the Willamette River flooded, backing water up to the locks, where the water measured 42 feet (13 m) above zero on the gauge. On January 26, 1903, the Yamhill river was pouring 21 feet (6.4 m) deep over the lock walls, and it was reported to be still rising. The lock was closed to navigation by high water on November 20, 1904. The highest water recorded in fiscal year 1905 was on December 31, 1904, when the river rose 11.1 feet (3.4 m) above the lock walls. No damage was sustained by the lock, dam, or the adjacent slopes.

From November 20, 1904 to April 2, 1905, the lock was closed to traffic 46 days and open 86 days. From April 2, 1904 to June 30, 1905, the lock was opened continuously. Total expenditures on maintenance, labor, materials, office expenses and so forth for fiscal year 1905 were $1,274.13. Total lockages were 123, of which 30 were for towboats and all others were for wood barges, log rafts, fishing boats, and launches. Total time operating during fiscal year (FY) 1905 was 74 hours and 12 minutes.

In three months in FY 1905 (July 1904, September 1904, and May 1905), there were only two lockages in each month despite the lock being open all month long. Total freight transiting the lock in FY 1905 was 4,109 tons. Total passengers were 44. Except for 17 tons of sand, almost all the freight was either logs or cord wood for paper pulp. In November, 1906, the locks were again reported closed due to a freshet. Water again was flowing over the lock walls.

On August 31, 1908, the steamer Leona was placed on a tri-weekly run from Portland to McMinnville. This was the first time in about five years that a steamboat had operated above the lock. Reportedly a good cargo was carried on the initial trip. A few days before, Leona had been brought up to McMinnville under Captain Turper. This scouting trip had been difficult because of the snags and floating logs in the river. The government snag boat was expected to soon clear these obstructions.

In mid-September 1908, the water behind the dam was drained to allow a fish ladder to be built around it, and as a result, the river "scarcely floats a plank". As a result, Leona was forced to suspend operations to McMinnville.

By the end of 1908 a fish ladder had been installed at the dam.

During fiscal year 1909, the locks were operated 155 times. The locks were closed 74 days, from September 23, 1908, to March 24, 1909, because of high water. The cost of operating the locks during FY 1909 was $1,188.66.

=== 1911 to 1920 ===
It was a pleasant lock where the tender could grow gray in solitude, undisturbed in his meditations, because only an occasional steamboat came along to wake him up. At the beginning there was practically no traffic on the Yamhill, and what there was steadily declined until, in 1921, only lone ton of freight went through the locks, traveling in solitary grandeur. In addition, about 2,100 tons of rafted logs went down the river, along with 26 passengers that year.

— Randall V. Mills, Sternwheelers Up Columbia, p. 146.

During fiscal year (FY) 1913, the locks were operated 91 times and closed 65 days because of high water. The cost to maintain the locks in FY 1913 was $1,300.28.

In 1914, regularly scheduled steamboat service was being conducted on the Yamhill River by the Oregon City Transportation Company, but only as far as Dayton. During the calendar years 1913 through 1915, the following short tons of freight were moved through the locks: 1913, 432 tons, estimated total value $1,728; 1914, 1,314¼ tons, total value $5,777; 1915, 639 tons, total value $20,627.

In April 1914, it was reported that the locks would be used again by a sternwheeler, to move paving material from Portland to McMinnville for the Montague-O'Reilly Company, which had been awarded a paving contract in McMinnville. Measurements were taken of three bridges crossing the Yamhill and it was found that there was enough clearance under them to allow a sternwheeler to pass.

In its 1916 report, the Corps of Engineers wrote "there is no regular boat traffic through the lock." On December 5, 1916, rising waters in the Yamhill river covered the lock, barring navigation to McMinnville. The steamer Woodland returned to Portland on December 5, 1916, having failed to proceed beyond Dayton. The steamer Pomona was scheduled to depart December 6, 1916 from Portland for Dayton, but no further upriver on the Yamhill.

In February 1917, Carl M. Johnson, mate of the government snag boat Mathloma, was appointed lock master.

New lock gates were installed in the summer of 1919. There had been no previous replacement of the gates since the locks were opened. Replacement work began on July 11, 1919. The new gates were built at Oregon City. The original gates had been built of Douglas fir. On August 10, 1919, work was complete on the replacement gates.

In July 1924, the Greyhound Transportation Company proposed placing a small steamer on the Yamhill river that, if business warranted, would use the lock to serve on the stretch to McMinnville. This steamer would be only about 65 feet (20 m) in length, too small to be legally required to have a crew of more than two men. With no more than two men on board, it could save the expense of additional crew and be more likely to earn a profit.

=== 1921 to 1930 ===
As of July 5, 1925, it had been a year since a boat had passed through the locks. The gates had to be opened once a week so that the machinery could be reported in good condition. There was not much else for the lock keeper to do except mow the lawn and water the plants at the small park which the government had placed at the locks.

== Surge in log transports ==
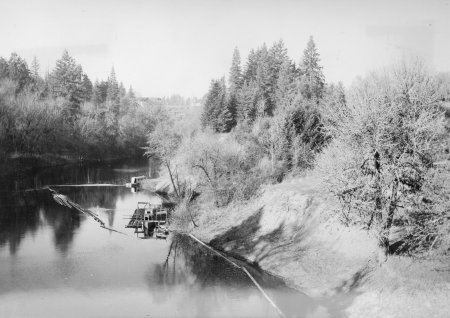
Lafayette steamboat landing, 1938

In the 1930s a series of forest fires, known as the Tillamook Burn greatly increased the amount of salvaged logs shipped down the Yamhill River through the lock. An important railroad trestle also burned, which left the river as the best remaining transport. In 1939 the number of logs transported on the Yamhill river was over two hundred times greater than what it had been in 1931.

The lock was closed from May 25 to June 20, 1935 while new lock gates were installed and repairs made to the miter sills.

In 1941, 99,000 tons of logs, with attendant small tugs, were transited through the lock. In 1943, 101,981 tons of logs were brought through the locks, the highest volume ever, falling off to 79,895 tons in 1946. In March 1947, the large Pope and Talbot logging concern, purchased property just upriver from the locks, and organized a log dump. Trucks brought logs to the river that had pooled up behind the dam, and dumped them in the water. Tugboats came up through the lock and towed the logs downriver. This continued until the early 1950s, when the log dump was destroyed by fire and rebuilt at Dayton, downriver from the lock.

On September 8, 1949, the water behind the lock and dam was scheduled to be lowered to 2.5 feet (0.76 m)to allow repairs to be made to the dam and fish ladder.

== Operations terminated ==
From FY 1944 to FY 1953, tonnage passing through the lock declined from 119,006 to 32,986. Most of this tonnage consisted of log rafts for a single company. In July 1953, the Army Corps of Engineers removed the local lock master and decided only to open the locks upon 24 hours prior notice to the lock master at Willamette Falls Locks in West Linn, Oregon.

In July 1953, the lock and dam needed about $95,000 worth of repair, while the operating budget had been cut from $10,000 to $5,000. There was not sufficient navigation to justify the repair expense, but local farmers used the pool above the dam to draw water for irrigation, and pleasure boats used the waterway.

The Corps of Engineers also planned to close the seven-acre park, which upset the residents of Yamhill county. The corps felt that it could not maintain a park unless it was connected to a navigation project. For a token amount, the Corps of Engineers was willing to lease the lock, dam and park. The Yamhill County government didn't have the money even to maintain the park, and an effort was underway to get the state to accept into the state park system.

In 1954, operation of the lock ceased permanently when the government received word from logging operators that they would no longer be using the lock. All commercial boat service through the lock had stopped many years before. After the lock was shut down, a large log drifting down the river floated over the top of the lock, striking the lock machinery, effectively putting the lock permanently out of operation.

== Transfer to Yamhill County ==
In 1956, under a bill sponsored by U.S. Representative A. Walter Norblad, Congress authorized transfer of the lock and dam to Yamhill County. The bill, which authorized the transfer of 28 federal locks and dams which had gone out of service, had been requested by the Corps of Engineers. President Dwight D. Eisenhower signed the bill in early August, 1956. The bill authorized the Corps to transfer the property to state, county or other groups.

The state park superintendent, C.H. Armstrong, said that the park would go to the county. Yamhill County Commissioner Charles R. Newman said the county was only interested in the eight-acre park, and not the lock, and had set up a park commission to manage it. Newman said that farm owners had expressed interest in the dam for irrigation purposes.

The last vessels to transit the lock were five pleasure boats which had come up the Willamette and the Yamhill rivers specially to use the lock on the closing day.

== Post-closure disposition ==
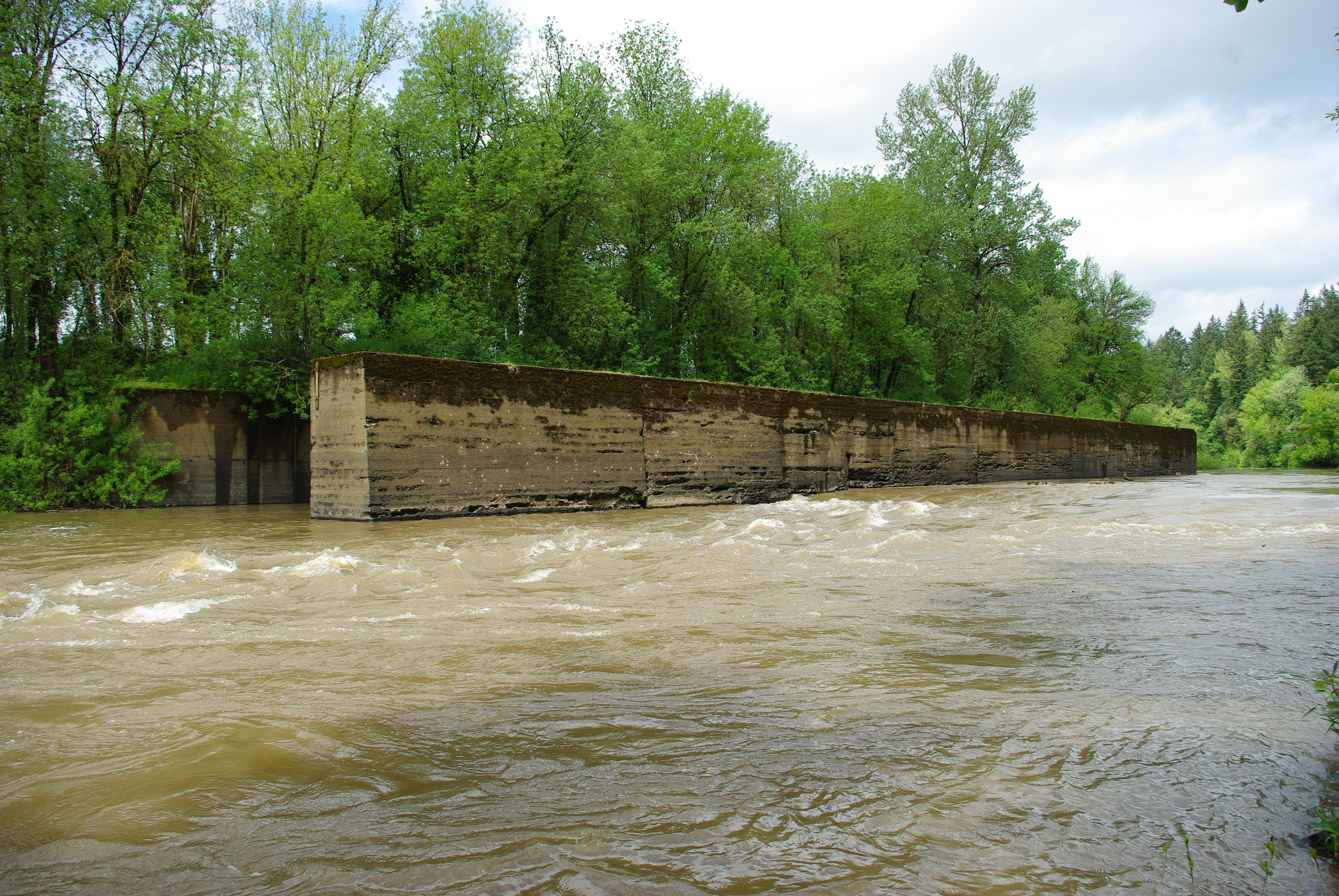
The lock walls as they appeared in 2009.

The Corps of Engineers had maintained the property next to the lock and dam as a park for a number of years. The county had sought the property for a number of years, and the river there had become a popular place for swimming.

The transfer was finally effected on January 19, 1959, by a deed to Yamhill County, which included the park area as well. The details of the transfer had been worked out by the General Services Administration.

In June 1960, the Oregon State Fish Commission ordered that demand be made on Yamhill County to either build a fish ladder at the dam, or remove the dam entirely. By this time, the lock gates had broken out, but the dam still held water for about 20 farmers. After three years of negotiations and disputes about whether the dam should be preserved for irrigation purposes, or destroyed to facilitate the spawning runs of salmon, on September 18, 1963, by order of the state fish commission, the dam was destroyed by the use of explosives.

== Placed on the National Register of Historic Places ==
On June 21, 1991, the lock and dam were placed on the National Register of Historic Places. At that time, much of the original structure remained. Most prominently the lock walls remained in place. About halfway along the east side of the water wall, runs over a jumble of stones, falling about 6 feet (1.8 m), which marks where the dam once stood. At low water pilings and remains of wooden revetments were visible. Parts of the lock gates still lay on the lock floor just above the lower lock sill. The original concrete walkway along the top of the east bank slope still remained, and offered a good view of the lock. The lock keeper's house, on the east side of the river, still existed in 1991, but was not included in the proposal for registration, as it was in private ownership and the property holders did not wish it to be included.

A county park and picnic area had been established on the grounds and was in use in 1991. This did not detract from the overall historicity of the location.

== Archival resources ==
Plans and drawings for the lock, prepared by the Corps of Engineers, are now in the collection of the Oregon Historical Society.

== Notes ==
=== Books ===
- Corning, Howard McKinley (1973). Willamette Landings -- Ghost Towns of the River (2nd ed.). Portland, OR: Oregon Historical Society. ISBN 0875950426.
- Mills, Randall V. (1977) [1947]. Stern-wheelers up Columbia: A Century of Steamboating in the Oregon Country. Lincoln, Nebraska: University of Nebraska Press. ISBN 0-8032-5874-7.

=== Reports ===
- Michler, N. (December 21, 1874). "Examination of Yamhill River, Oregon". Annual Report of the Chief of Engineers to the Secretary of War for the year 1875. Washington, DC: Government Printing Office. p. 792.
- McIndoe, J.F. Maj. (1912). Operating and Care of Lock and Dam in Yamhill River, Oreg.: Operations During the Fiscal Year 1912. Washington, DC: Government Printing Office. p. 2814.
- Operating and Care of Lock and Dam in Yamhill River, Oreg.: Annual Report of the Chief of Engineers for the Fiscal Year 1922. Washington, DC: Government Printing Office. 1922. p. 1921.

=== Journal articles ===
- Reddick, Suann Murray (1990). "Dream to Demolition: The Yamhill Lock and Dam". Oregon Historical Quarterly (part 1). 91 (1). Portland, OR: Oregon Historical Society: 43–80. JSTOR 20614296.
- Reddick, Suann Murray (1990). "Dream to Demolition: The Yamhill Lock and Dam". Oregon Historical Quarterly (part 2). 91 (2). Portland, OR: Oregon Historical Society: 154–202. JSTOR 20614313.

=== On-line newspaper collections ===
- "Historic Oregon Newspapers". University of Oregon.
- "Chronicling America: Historic American Newspapers". Library of Congress.

=== Other ===
- Stoller, Ruth; Williams, George W. (June 21, 1991). Yamhill River Lock and Dam (National Register of Historic Places Registration Form). National Park Service.

== Images ==
=== Pacific Northwest Stream Survey, Oregon State University ===
- Upper lock gates, Yamhill River Lock, September 25, 1940
- Spillway and fish ladder, Yamhill River dam, with lock wall in background, September 1940
- Fish ladder at Yamhill River dam, September 26, 1940
- Fish ladder without water, Yamhill River dam, August 23, 1940
