= La Bonita =

La Bonita may refer to:

== Places ==
=== Mexico ===
- La Bonita, Palenque, locality in Palenque municipality, Chiapas
- La Bonita (mine in Coahuila)
- La Bonita (mine in Durango)
- La Bonita, Del Nayar, locality in El Nayar, Nayarit
- La Bonita, China, locality in China municipality, Nuevo León
- La Bonita, Hualahuises, locality in Hualahuises municipality, Nuevo León
- La Bonita, Matehuala, locality in Matehuala municipality, San Luis Potosí
- La Bonita, Jiménez, locality in Jiménez municipality, Tamaulipas
- La Bonita, Soto la Marina, locality in Soto la Marina municipality, Tamaulipas
- La Bonita, Pánuco, locality in Pánuco municipality, Veracruz

=== Ecuador ===
- La Bonita, Ecuador, town and capital of Sucumbíos Canton

== Songs ==
- "La Bonita", song by Mellowhype from the 2012 album Numbers
- "La Bonita", song by Michael Fall and DJ J Nice from the 2013 album Turn on your radio

== Other uses ==
- Brenda "La Bonita" Flores, Mexican-born boxer
- La Bonita (restaurant), Mexican restaurant chain in Portland, Oregon

== See also ==
- Bonita (disambiguation)
