= Bonita (1900 sternwheeler) =

1900 steamboat in United States

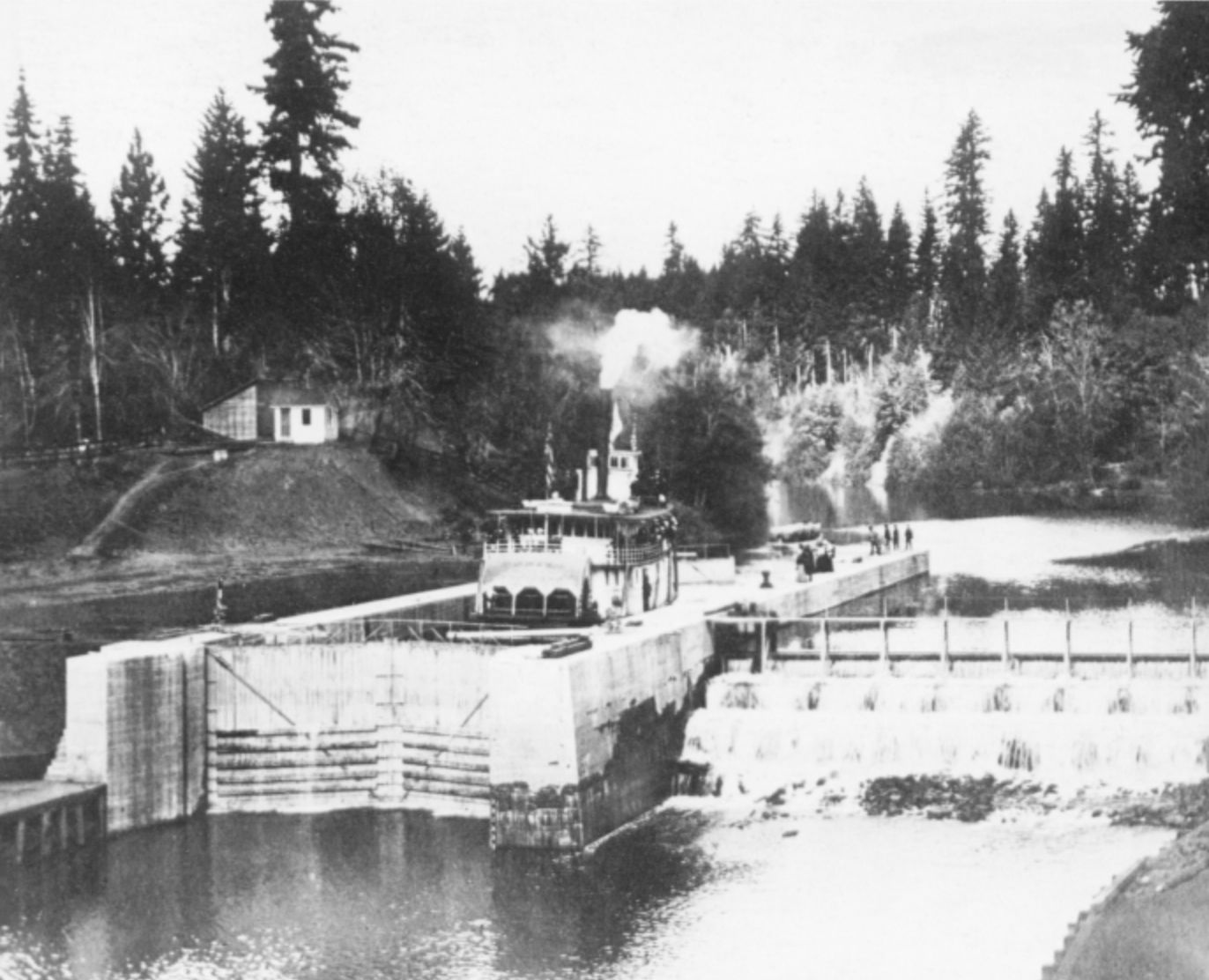
- Bonita at the opening of the Yamhill River lock and dam, September 24, 1900

History
- Name: Bonita (1900–1902); Metlako (1902–1924); B. H. Smith Jr. (1924–1931)
- Route: Willamette, Yamhill, Columbia, Cowlitz, Lewis and Lake rivers
- Builder: Johnston boatyard
- Completed: 1900, at Portland, Oregon.
- Out of service: 1931
- Identification: U.S. #3830
- Fate: Abandoned.

General characteristics
- Type: riverine passenger/freight
- Tonnage: 198 gross; 122 net tons.
- Length: 109 ft (33.2 m) measured over hull.
- Beam: 24.4 ft 9 in (7.7 m) measured over hull.
- Depth: 4.8 ft 0 in (1.46 m)
- Installed power: twin steam engines, horizontally mounted, single cylinder, cylinder bore 9 in (23 cm) and stroke of 4 ft (1.22 m).
- Propulsion: sternwheel
- Capacity: 200 passengers; 125 tons of freight

Bonita was a steamboat which operated on the Willamette and Yamhill rivers. This boat was renamed Metlako in 1902, and operated under that name until 1924 on the Columbia River and its tributaries, the Cowlitz, Lewis and Lake rivers. In 1924, Metlako was renamed B. H. Smith Jr., operating under that name until 1931, when the steamer was abandoned. As Bonita, in September 1900, this vessel was the first steamer to pass through the Yamhill locks.

== Design, construction and dimensions ==
Bonita was built specifically to run from Portland to McMinnville, Oregon. According to one source, Bonita was built for Captain Hosford by the Johnston boatyard on the east side of Portland, Oregon. According to another (non-contemporaneous) source, Bonita was built by Robert Green for Bucham & Burns Construction.

Reportedly Bonita was built for the run from Portland to Lacamas Lake near Camas, Washington, but the boat's owner, Captain Hosford, was considering placing the vessel on the route to Dayton, Oregon, along the Willamette and Yamhill rivers.

Bonita was 109 ft (33.2 m) measured over the hull. Measurements over the hull excluded the length of hull extensions, such as the projection of the main deck over the stern, called the "fantail", to mount the sternwheel. The Bonita had a beam (width) of 24.4 ft 9 in (7.7 m), again measured over the hull and exclusive of projections along the top of the hull, called the guards. The vessel's depth of hold was 4.8 ft 9 in (1.7 m).

A vessel's overall size was measured in tons, which was a unit of volume and not of weight. Bonita was 198 gross tons and 122 net tons. Each steamer in commercial service at that time had an official steamboat registry number. For Bonita, the official merchant vessel registry number was 3830.

Bonita was expected to carry 200 passengers and 125 tons of freight. Power to the stern-wheel was furnished by twin steam engines, horizontally mounted, single cylinder, cylinder bore 9 in (23 cm) and stroke of 4 ft (1.22 m). These engines generated 5 nominal horse power.

== Operations as Bonita ==
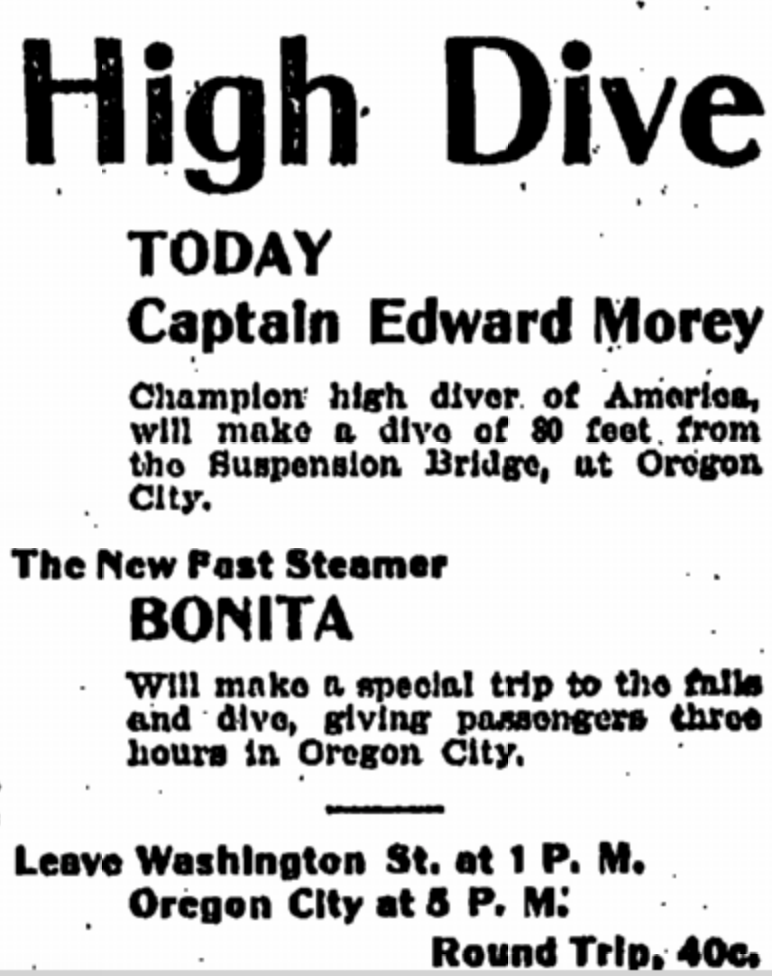
Advertisement for excursion on Bonita to Oregon City.

Bonita was launched on the morning of March 28, 1900.

Hosford took Bonita on a trial run on Saturday, April 14, 1900, and the vessel ran well. Full completion of the vessel was expected by the evening of April 17, 1900. On Sunday, April 22, 1900, an excursion on Bonita was advertised, to run from Portland to Oregon City, to see Captain Edward Morey, billed as the "champion high diver of America" dive 80 feet off the Oregon City suspension bridge. Round trip fare was 40 cents. The next Sunday, April 29, 1900, Bonita ran an excursion to Vancouver, Washington, again to see Captain Morey dive, this time from a tower 90 feet high.

In 1900, Bonita ran daily from McMinnville to Portland, leaving every morning. The boat remained two hours in Portland, then returned to McMinnville. The rates charged by the steamer were lower than the rates charged by the railroad. Soon after Bonita began the McMinnville route, the railroad lowered its rates to compete and improved its service. The railroad, which also controlled the steamship dock in Portland, refused to allow Bonita to use the dock, thus increasing drayage fees for the steamer. The railroad won back the shippers, and Bonita was forced off the route.

=== Carriage of hop pickers ===
In early September 1900, Bonita carried hop pickers from Portland to hops yards in the Willamette Valley, departing daily from Portland at 1:30 pm.

=== Collision with Pomona ===
On October 22, 1900, Bonita collided with the steamer Pomona as both vessels were entering the Willamette Falls Locks. There was no loss of life or damage to cargo. Bonita sustained $200 worth of damage. The steamboat inspection service investigated the incident on November 5, 1900. As a result, the license of A.J. Spong, master of Pomona, was suspended for 10 days for carelessness and negligence in handling his vessel.

=== Stranded on Yamhill Bar ===
In July 1901 as Bonita was lining across the bar of the Yamhill river, the capstan gave way, throwing one man into the river, and striking several others, but without causing serious injury. Bonita was stuck for most of a day, until the steamer Altona happened along and pulled Bonita off the shoal. The next day, Bonita successfully transited the Yamhill bar heading upriver, but when the steamer was on the other side of the bar, the river water fell, leaving Bonita trapped behind the bar.

Bonita's captain sought assistance from the local road crew, which put to work carving out with a road scraper a channel in the bar, reportedly just big enough for Bonita to pass through. Said the Morning Oregonian of this incident: "It is further proposed that she be renamed the Gopher and equipped with a plow or two and a few agricultural huskies as assistant engineers. With a bucket of water and a road-scraper the Bonita could go overland to Kansas or anywhere."

=== Transport of hop pickers ===
Bonita carried hop pickers in the 1901 picking season, departing from the foot of Washington street at 7:00 am daily for the hop fields.

== Operations as Metlako ==
Metlako, at the Cowlitz River levee, circa 1923

On Saturday, March 15, 1902, the White Collar Line (also known as the Regulator Line) acquired Bonita for the run from Portland to The Dalles, Oregon. On this run, Bonita was to alternate with the White Collar line's steamer Tahoma.

On April 10, 1902, the new owners changed the name of the vessel to Metlako, a name derived from a Native American legend. Reportedly when Bonita was renamed, the vessel "received improvements which made her practically a new boat."

=== Placed on Columbia River route ===
In late April 1902, Metlako ran from Portland to The Dalles, Oregon every Tuesday, Thursday, and Saturday, departing from the Regulator Line's dock at the foot of Alder Street at 7:00 a.m. Metlako departed The Dalles on the return trip to Portland every Monday, Wednesday, and Friday, at 7:00 a.m.

On the morning of May 3, 1902, en route to The Dalles, about five miles upriver from Vancouver, a cylinder head blew out on Metlako, seriously (or slightly injuring a passenger.

=== Sold to Seattle, Portland & Spokane Railway ===
The Regulator Line sold Metlako to the Seattle, Portland & Seattle Railway.

At about noon on January 27, 1903, Peter Gearin, a crewman on Metlako, either leaped or fell off the boat into the Columbia River and was drowned. The incident occurred at Reed's Island in the Columbia River, as Metlako was steaming upstream from Vancouver, where Gearin had boarded the vessel. Gearin was seen to dive off the companionway into the river, but whether it was suicide or an accidental loss of footing, could not be determined. The boat stopped to look for him, but no trace could be located, so Metlako continued on its way. Gearin, age 38, had been working on steamboats for about 15 years.

Captain Johnnie Brown had been master of Metlako for several years. In October 1910, Capt. Charles Jordan took over as captain of Metlako from Capt. G.F. Gildez. In May 1908, Metlako was engaged as a tender for the construction of the Columbia River Railroad Bridge, and had been so since the start of bridge construction.

=== Cowlitz, Lewis, and Lake river service ===
Once construction of the railroad bridge was complete, Metlako was tied up at Vancouver until December, 1908, when the Spokane, Portland & Seattle Railway sold the vessel to Albert Burcham, of Kelso, Washington. Burcham intend to use Metlako on the Cowlitz and Columbia rivers in the logging business.

=== Reconstruction ===
Metlako was rebuilt in 1909 at Kelso, Washington, by Robert Green for Burcham & Burns Construction. In 1907, prior to reconstruction, Metlako was 198 gross and 122 registered tons, the same as Bonita when constructed. The total crew required for Metlako was 13, as shown on the 1907 merchant vessel register. After reconstruction, in 1909, Metlako measured out at 91 gross and 87 registered tons. The total required crew was reduced from 13 to 6. The length and beam of the vessel remained the same, indicating that the reduction in size was attributable to removal of a large part of the cabin structure.

=== Operations following reconstruction ===
In February 1915, as Metlako was being overhauled in Portland, there was talk on the waterfront that it would be placed on the Portland-Lewis River route. In early July 1916, high water on the Columbia river backed up the Lake River to Ridgefield, Washington, which was served by the steamers Metlako and Mimare. In 1919, A.E. Hayes, of Kelso, Washington, rebuilt Metlako and ran it for a short time on the Portland-Kelso route.

=== Legal claims ===
In March 1920, Metlako was tied up at a dock in Kelso, Washington, because of legal claims pending against the vessel in federal court in Tacoma, Washington. The claims arose from an action filed by the Union Oil Company, alleging that they were owed $1,070.65 for fuel supplied to Metlako.

On April 26, 1920, Metlako was sold by the U.S. Marshal for $5,200 to Captain Caples, of Woodland, Washington and associates. Another source states that Walker & Co. bought the vessel at the marshal's sale. In February 1921, Walker & Co. sold Metlako to E.E. Graham & Co.

=== Sinking filmed ===
The sinking of the Metlako was filmed on motion picture camera and made into part of a newsreel which was exhibited in August, 1921.

== Operations as B. H. Smith Jr. ==
In January 1923, E.E. Graham & Co. sold Metlako to Long-Bell Lumber Co. The new owners intended to use the vessel to tow barges and other craft. B. H. Smith Jr. was much smaller than Metlako, with the Smith measuring out at 97 gross and 81 registered tons.

On April 25, 1924, the name of the vessel was changed to B. H. Smith Jr., after the assistant general manager of Long-Bell Lumber Co. Long-Bell Lumber Co. had its headquarters in Longview, Washington.

== Disposition ==
B.H Smith Jr. was abandoned in 1931.

== See also ==
- Steamboats of the Willamette River

== Images ==
- Longview Public Library Excellent high resolution image of Metlako, at Cowlitz River Dike, circa 1923.
