= Bonito, Bahia =

Municipality of Bahia, Brazil

Bonito
- Municipality

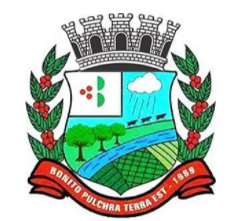
- Flag Coat of arms

- Location of Bonito in Bahia
- Interactive map of Bonito
- Location in Brazil
- Coordinates: 11°57′57″S 41°16′01″W
- Country: Brazil
- Region: Nordeste
- State: Bahia
- Territory of Identity: Chapada Diamantina
- Political Emancipation: June 13, 1989 (age 37)

Government
  - Type: Mayor–council government
  - Body: Bonito City Council
  - Mayor: Edivam José Cedro De Souza

Area
  - Total: 641.229 km^{2} (247.580 sq mi)
- Elevation: 990 m (3,250 ft)

Population (2020)
  - Total: 16,884
  - Density: 26.331/km^{2} (68.196/sq mi)
- Time zone: UTC−3 (BRT)
- Area code: 75

Bonito is a municipality in the state of Bahia in the North-East region of Brazil. It is the fifth municipality in the country with the highest proportion of Quilombola population, with 50.2% of its inhabitants being part of this group.

== History ==
The municipality of Bonito, located in the Chapada Diamantina region, originated in the late 19th century. At the time, a road connected neighboring towns, and the area where the city now stands became a resting point for travelers, thanks to the presence of a large tree that provided shade. This place, which initially served as a shelter, was gradually inhabited by immigrants, forming a small community.

At the beginning of the 20th century, the town consisted of just a few residences. The holding of a regular fair, organized by the residents, marked the local economic development, reducing the dependence on travel to neighboring towns. Over time, the town continued to grow, attracting new residents from other regions.

Agriculture was a key factor in the development of the area, especially coffee cultivation. The introduction of modern cultivation techniques and adaptation to local conditions allowed the consolidation of a promising agricultural activity. Financing projects and technical analyses ended up favoring the expansion of plantations, which contributed significantly to economic and population growth.

Religion also played an important role in the formation of the community. Masses and religious celebrations marked the strengthening of social ties, culminating in the construction of a chapel with the collective support of the inhabitants.

It was created as a district with the name of Bonito (former village) by State Law No. 4,031 of May 14, 1982, and integrated into the municipality of Utinga.

It was elevated to the category of municipality with its current name by State Law No. 5,021 of June 13, 1989, separated from the municipality of Utinga. The municipality was established on January 1, 1990, with the inauguration of the first councilors and the first mayor, with his deputy, democratically elected.

== Geography ==
It is located at Latitude 11º58'10" South and Longitude 41º15'57" West, at an elevation of 990 meters.

=== Communities ===
Name	Area	Category	Ref.
Bonito	Urban	City and Municipal Seat	
Catuaba	Semi-urban	Town and Municipal District	
Cabeceira do Brejo	Semi-urban	Town and Municipal District	
Baixa do Cheiro	Rural	Village	
Guarani	Rural	Village	
Guarani II	Rural	Village	
Botafogo	Rural	Village	
Baixa Vistosa	Rural	Village	
Gramiá	Rural	Village	
Mata Florença	Rural	Village	
Morrinhos	Rural	Village	
Lagoa do Alívio	Rural	Village	
Gitirana	Rural	Village	
Quixaba	Rural	Village	
Catuabinha	Rural	Village	
Agropeva	Rural	Village	

=== Hydrography ===
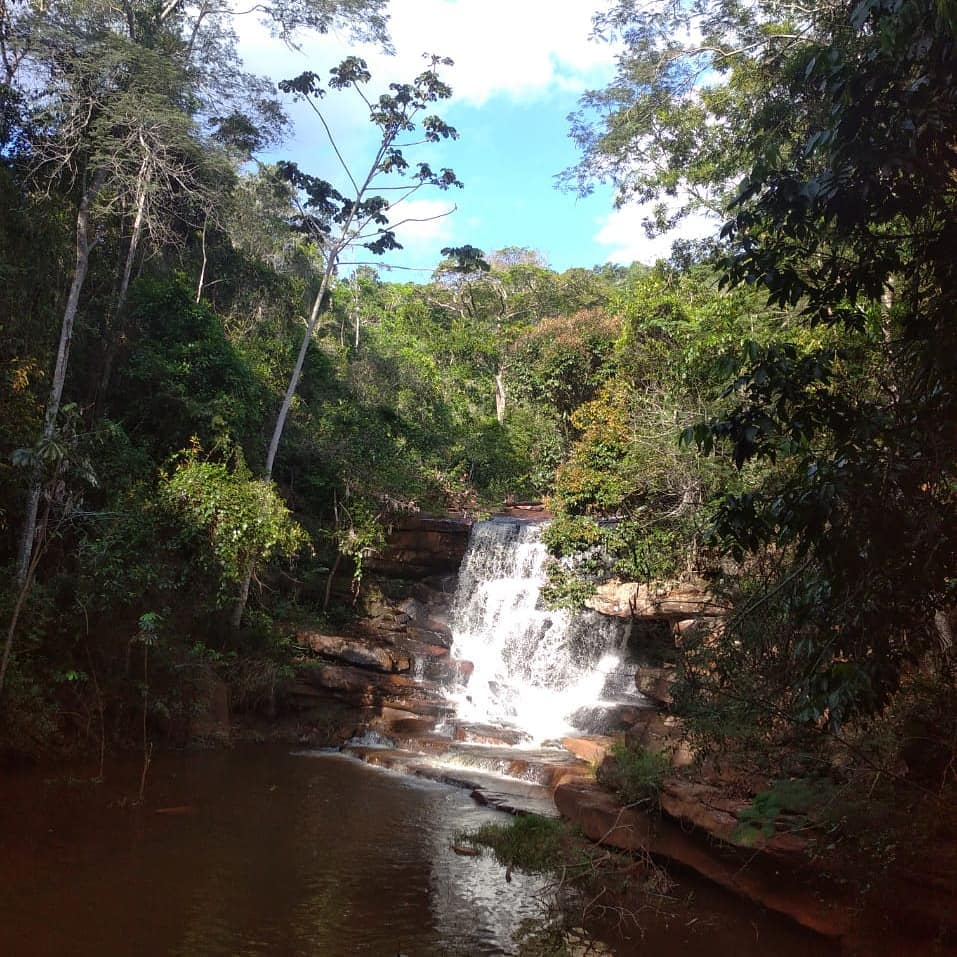
Image of Cacique Waterfall, located near the village of Botafogo, Bonito.

The municipality is located in the Paraguaçu River basin and is bathed by the Bonito, Tijuco, das Lajes and Sohen Rivers. It is also rich in waterfalls, with highlights including the Soltinha Waterfall and the Cacique Waterfall, tourist attractions in the region.

== Political-Administrative Organization ==
The Municipality of Bonito has a political-administrative structure composed of the Executive Branch, headed by a Mayor elected by universal suffrage, who is directly assisted by municipal secretaries appointed by him, and the Legislative Branch, institutionalized by the City Council of Bonito, a collegiate body representing the citizens that is composed of 11 councilors also elected by universal suffrage.

=== Municipal authorities of Bonito ===
==== Municipal Executive ====
City hall
Position	Incumbent	Party	Term	Ref.
Mayor	Edivam José Cedro De Souza	PSD	(2025–2028)	
Deputy Mayor	Ueriton de Sousa Primo	PP	(2025–2028)	
Treasurer	Gilmar de Sá Teles Silva		(2025–present)	
Departments
Department	Secretary/Director	Party	Term	Ref.
Health	Márcio Fagner Souto de Barros	PSD	(2025–present)	
Education	Reinan Cedro de Oliveira	PSD	(2025–present)	
Urban and Rural Development	To be defined			
Social Welfare	Sidalva Alves dos Santos	PSD	(2025–present)	
Culture, Sports and Tourism	Alex Sandro Ferreira de Lima	PP	(2025–present)	
Agriculture	Alek Sandro Santana Beu		(2025–present)	
Administration, Planning and Finance	Geovanilson José de Souza.		(2025–present)	
Environment	André Torres		(2025–present)	

==== City Council ====
Composition of the Bonito City Council after the 2024 Elections:

Government: PSD: 3 seats PP: 4 seats PSB: 2 seats Opposition: PDT: 2 seats

== See also ==
- List of municipalities in Bahia
