= Bonata =

Bonata may refer to:

- Bonata septata, an extinct genus of Ediacaran organism
- 49987 Bonata, a minor planet
- Diego Bonata, 2003 IDSA Galilleo Award winner and president of CieloBuio
- Serafino Bonata, Italian skyrunner who competed at the 2010 Skyrunning World Championships

== See also ==
- Bonita (disambiguation)
- Boneta, Utah
