= USS Bonito =

USS Bonito may refer to the following ships:

- USS Bonito (1846), was acquired by the Navy on 25 May 1846 and commissioned on 30 May 1846. Has often been incorrectly called the Bonita.

== See also ==
- USS Bonita - Commonly confused with Bonito
