= Bonita (Paphlagonia) =

Town of ancient Paphlagonia

Coordinates: 41°29′15″N 33°07′30″E

Bonita was a town of ancient Paphlagonia, inhabited in Roman times. The name does not occur among ancient authors but is inferred from epigraphic and other evidence.

Its site is located near Meğre, Asiatic Turkey.
