= USS Bonita =

USS Bonita has been the name of more than one ship of the United States Navy, and may refer to:

- USS C-4 (SS-15), originally named USS Bonita, a submarine in commission from 1909 to 1919
- USS Bonita (SP-540), a patrol vessel commissioned in 1917 and sunk in 1918
- USS Bonita (SS-165), originally named USS V-3 (SF-6), a submarine in commission from 1926 to 1937 and from 1940 to 1945
- USS Bonita (SSK-3), originally named USS K-3, a submarine in commission from 1952 to 1958

== Note ==
- A brig engaged in the African slave trade captured on 10 October 1860 has been identified both as Bonita and Bonito but never was part of the United States Navy.

== See also ==
- USS Bonito
