= Bonita, Kansas =

- Unincorporated community
- Location within Kansas Location within the United States
- Coordinates: 38°48′40″N 94°48′53″W
- Country: United States
- State: Kansas
- County: Johnson
- Elevation: 1,099 ft (335 m)
- Time zone: UTC-6 (CST)
  - Summer (DST): UTC-5 (CDT)
- FIPS code: 20-07950
- GNIS ID: 479559

Bonita is an unincorporated community in Johnson County, Kansas, United States, and part of the Kansas City metropolitan area. It is located at 38°48′40″N 94°48′53″W.

== History ==
Bonita is a Spanish name meaning "beautiful".

Bonita had a post office from 1880 until 1934.
