= Rio Bonito =

Rio Bonito can refer to:

- East Biggs, California, community formerly called Rio Bonito
- Rio Bonito (New Mexico), a river in Lincoln County, New Mexico
- Rio Bonito, Guatemala
- Rio Bonito, Honduras
- Rio Bonito, Venezuela, a town in Monagas state, Venezuela

== Brazil ==
- Rio Bonito do Iguaçu, a town in Paraná
- Rio Bonito, Rio de Janeiro
- Rio Bonito, São Paulo, a neighborhood in the city of São Paulo, also known as Bairro Rio Bonito
- Rio Bonito, Santa Catarina, the name of two rivers in the state
- Caiapônia, a municipality in south-central Goiás state, Brazil, also known as Rio Bonito

== See also ==
- Rio Bonito Atlético Clube, a football (soccer) team in Rio de Janeiro
- Bonito River (disambiguation)
