= Bonita Elementary School District =

School district in Arizona, United States

Address
- 18008 South Fort Grant Road Willcox, Arizona, 85643; United States

District information
- Type: Public
- Grades: K–8
- NCES District ID: 0401260

Students and staff
- Students: 104
- Teachers: 9.0
- Staff: 10.0
- Student–teacher ratio: 11.56

Other information
- Website: www.bonitaesd.com

Bonita School District 16 is a school district in Graham County, Arizona.
