= Utinga =

Coordinates: 12.0819°S 41.0939°W

Utinga, Bahia, Brazil
- Municipality
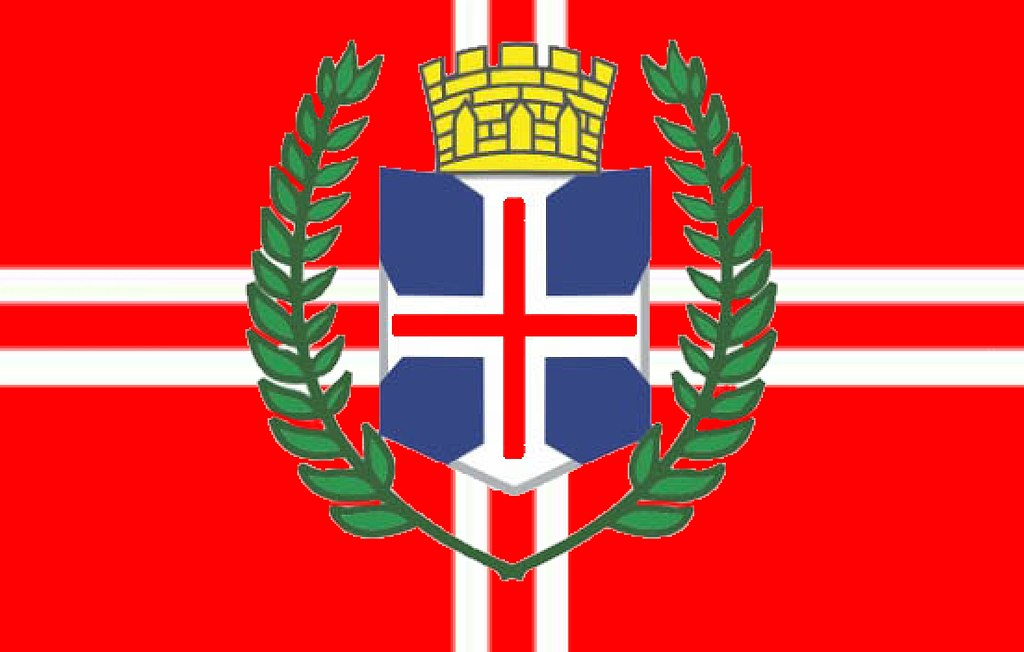
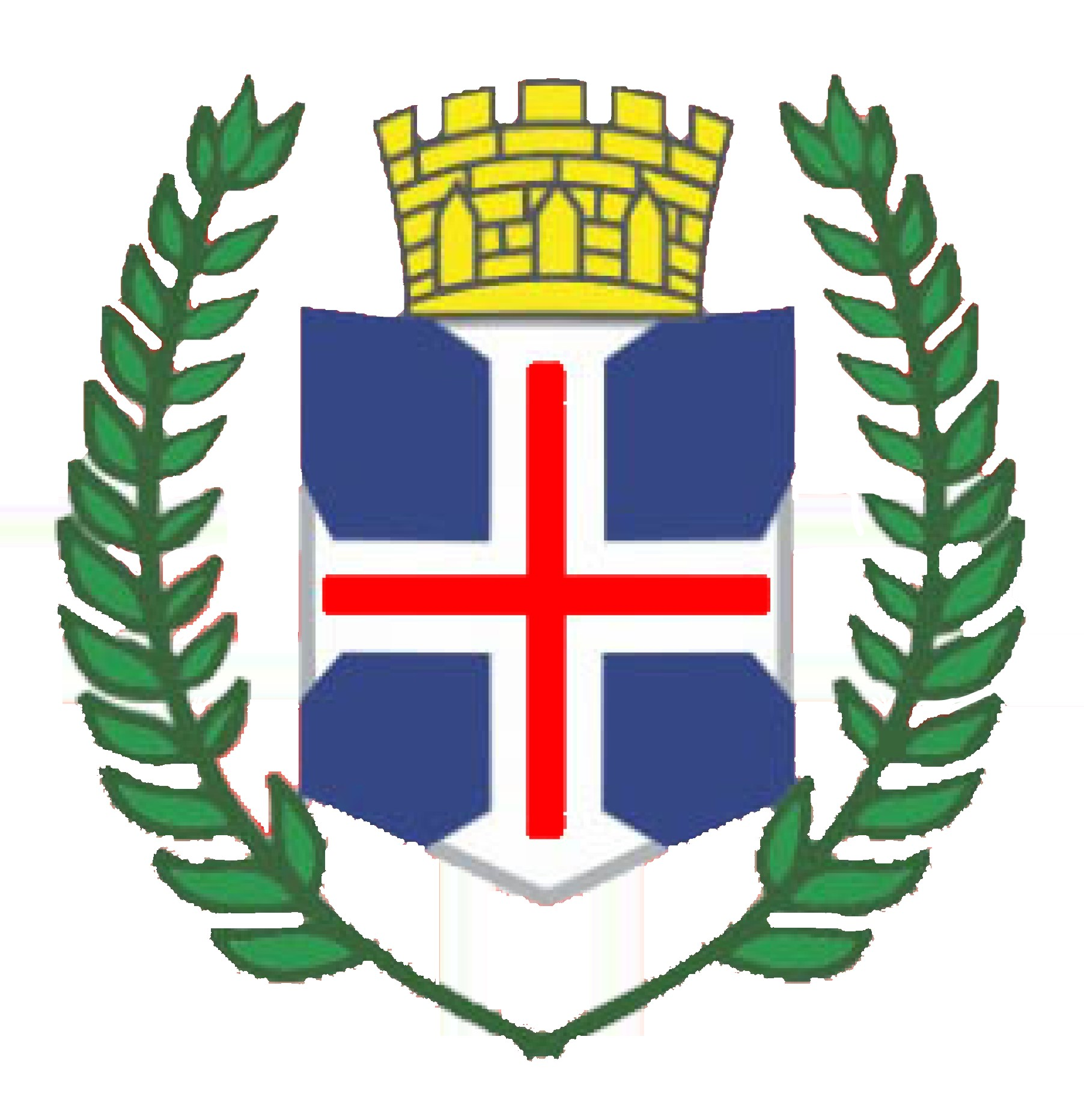
- Flag Coat of arms
- Interactive map of Utinga, Bahia, Brazil
- Country: Brazil
- Region: Nordeste
- State: Bahia

Population (2020)
  - Total: 19,256
- Time zone: UTC−3 (BRT)

Utinga is a municipality in the state of Bahia in the North-East region of Brazil.

== See also ==
- List of municipalities in Bahia
