= Bonita, Oregon =

Unincorporated community in the state of Oregon, United States

Bonita
- Unincorporated community
- Location within Oregon
- Coordinates: 45°25′1″N 122°45′54″W
- Country: United States
- State: Oregon
- County: Washington
- Elevation: 187 ft (57 m)
- Time zone: UTC-8 (Pacific (PST))
  - Summer (DST): UTC-7 (PDT)
- ZIP codes: 97224
- GNIS feature ID: 1166618

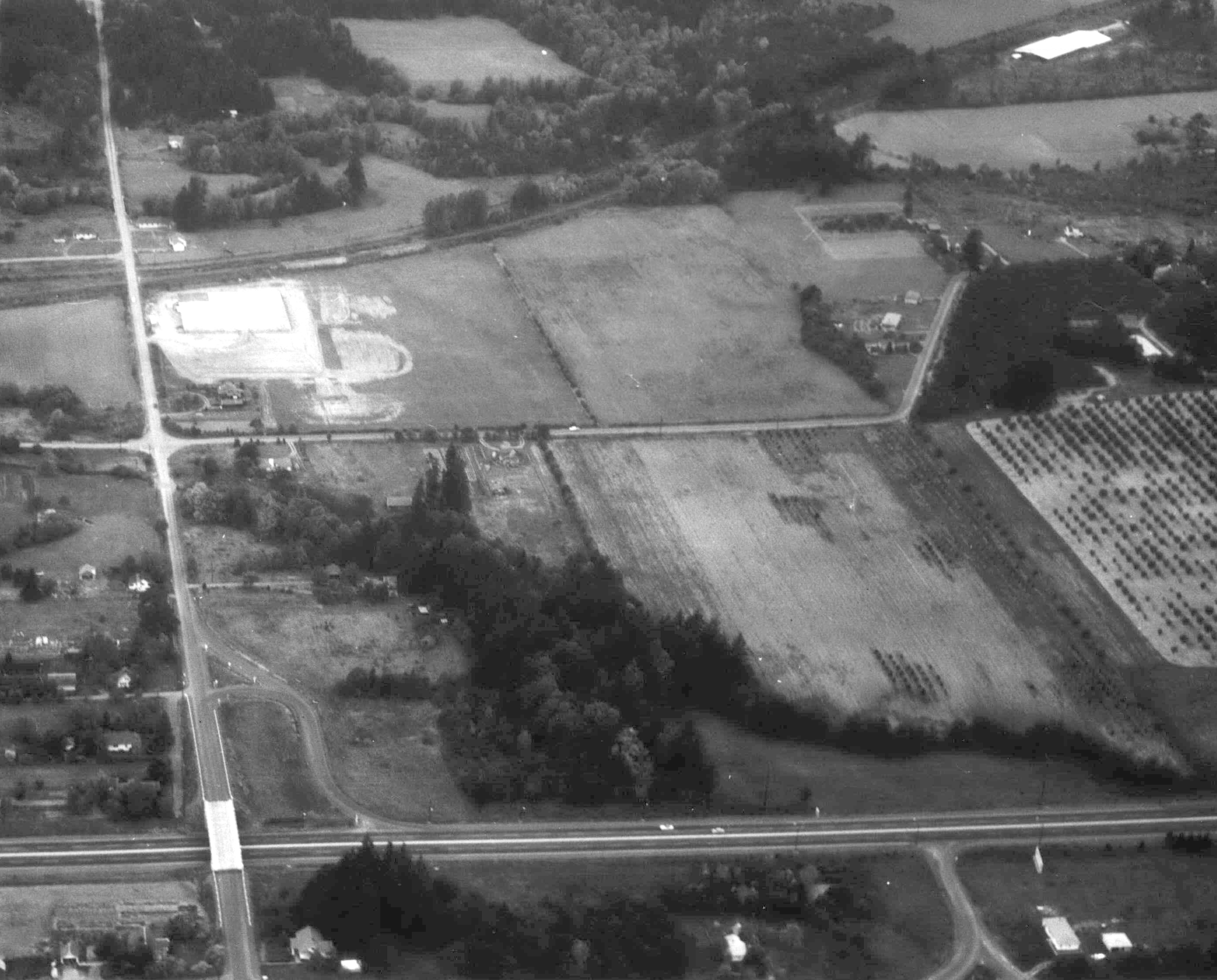
Bonita Road crossing I-5. Historical images of Beaverton, Oregon.

Bonita is a former unincorporated community in Washington County, Oregon, United States, now located within the boundaries of the city of Tigard. Not to be confused with Bonita neighborhood in Malheur County also in Oregon.

== History ==
The name "Bonita" derives from the Spanish word meaning "beautiful"; and it was named by local resident George W. Cassaday. Bonita was a former station of the Oregon Electric Railway.
