= Randall V. Mills =

American academic, historian, and folklorist (1907–1952)

Randall V. Mills

Randall V. Mills (1907-1952) was a professor of literature with a variety of interests related to the Pacific Northwest, including steamboats, railroads and folklore.

== Early life and education ==
Randall was born in Wisconsin in 1907. In 1929 Mills received his undergraduate degree from the University of California, Los Angeles (UCLA). His master's degree was received from University of California, Berkeley in 1932.

== University of Oregon ==
He became part of the University of Oregon English faculty in 1938. Mills had a variety of interests. One of his main interests was in the history of transportation in the Pacific Northwest, especially steamboats and railroads. He was also interested in all aspects of covered bridges. Another subject for which Mills showed enthusiasm was folklore, particularly proverbs, dialects, songs, superstitions and place names.

== Folklore ==
He was the founder and first president of the Oregon Folklore Society. He served as Director for the Oregon branch of the American Dialect Society, he also chaired the state sub-committee for the collection of dialect sayings. He held the position of associate editor for Western Folklore. Mills died in 1952 at the age of 44.

== Legacy ==
The University of Oregon named its folklore archives in honor of Mills. The Randall V. Mills Archives of Northwest Folklore, established in 1966, serve as a repository for information collected in Oregon by scholars and students of folklore. The archives are the largest facility of their kind in the Pacific Northwest of the United States. During his life, Mills assembled a collection of photographic negatives and prints of photographs depicting covered bridges and steamship captains in Oregon and railroad locomotives and cars in the western United States. This collection is now held by the University of Oregon.

== Books by Mills ==
- Stern-Wheelers up Columbia: A Century of Steamboating in the Oregon country. by Randall Vause Mills. Publisher: Lincoln : University of Nebraska Press, 1977, ©1947 ISBN 0-8032-5874-7.
- Oregon Speechways. by Randall V Mills. Publisher: [New York] : Columbia University Press, ©1950.
- Railroads Down the Valleys; Some Short Lines of the Oregon country. by Randall V Mills. Publisher: Palo Alto, Calif., Pacific Books, 1950.
