= Bonito River =

There are many rivers named Bonito River or Rio Bonito.

== Brazil ==
- 16 rivers including:
- Bonito River (Alonzo River)
- Bonito River (Caceribu River)
- Bonito River (Canoinhas River)
- Bonito River (Correntes River)
- Bonito River (Goiás)
- Bonito River (Ivaí River)
- Bonito River (Macaé River)
- Bonito River (Rio das Flores)
- Bonito River (Timbó River)
- Bonito River (Tocantins)

== Chile ==
- Bonito River (Chile)

== Costa Rica ==
- Bonito River (Costa Rica)

== Guatemala ==
- Bonito River (Guatemala)

== Honduras ==
- 3 rivers

== Mexico ==
- Bonito River (Mexico)

== Panama ==
- Bonito River (Panama)

== United States ==
- Rio Bonito (New Mexico)

== Venezuela ==
- 2 rivers

== See also ==
- Rio Bonito (disambiguation)
- Little River (disambiguation)
