= Altona (sternwheeler) =

US steamship

- Altona and Elwood at foot of Trade Street in Salem, Oregon, 1893.

History
- Name: Altona
- Owner: Oregon City Transportation Company
- Route: Columbia River, Willamette River, Alaska waters
- Launched: 1890, at Portland, Oregon.
- Identification: US # 106729 (original); 107453 (following reconstruction).
- Notes: Reconstructed at Portland, Oregon, in 1899. Served on Willamette River to Corvallis, Oregon, until 1907, then transferred to Alaska.

General characteristics
- Class & type: riverine steamboat, passenger/freighter
- Tonnage: 201 gross/190 registered as built; 329 gross/ 242 as reconstructed
- Length: 120 ft (36.58 m) as built; 123 ft (37.49 m) as reconstructed.
- Beam: 21 ft (6.40 m) as built; 29.7 ft (9.05 m) as reconstructed.
- Draft: 5.2 ft (1.58 m) as built; 4.8 ft (1.46 m) as reconstructed.
- Installed power: Twin single-cylinder horizontally mounted steam engines, 12" bore by 48" stroke, 9.6 nominal horsepower.
- Propulsion: sternwheeler

The steamship Altona operated from 1890 to 1907 on the Willamette River in the U.S. state of Oregon. In 1907, she was transferred to Alaska.

== Construction ==
Altona was built in 1890, at Portland, Oregon. She was a sternwheeler driven by twin-single single cylinder horizontally mounted steam engines. She was built for the Graham steamboat line, formally called the Oregon City Transportation Company, but also known as the "Yellow Stack Line". All the steamers of the line had names that ended in -ona: Latona, Ramona, Altona, Leona, Pomona, Oregona, and Grahamona.

== Operations on Willamette River ==
Altona ran the Willamette River as far as Corvallis, Oregon. In 1899 the vessel was rebuilt at Portland by David Stephenson and enlarged from 201 to 329 tons and from 120 ft (36.58 m) to 123 ft (37.49 m) On December 23, 1902, Altona was involved in a collision with the steamer Modoc, which occurred as follows according to the report of the Steamboat Inspection Service:

December 23.—At 7.30 a. m., about 2 miles (3.2 km) south of Portland, Willamette River, Oregon, during a heavy fog, the steamers Modoc and Altona collided, breaking both cylinder timbers on the port side, also fantail, wheelhouse, and wheel of the steamer Altona. No damage to steamer Modoc. No loss of lite or damage to cargo. Estimated damage to steamer Altona. $500.

== Operations on the Yamhill River ==
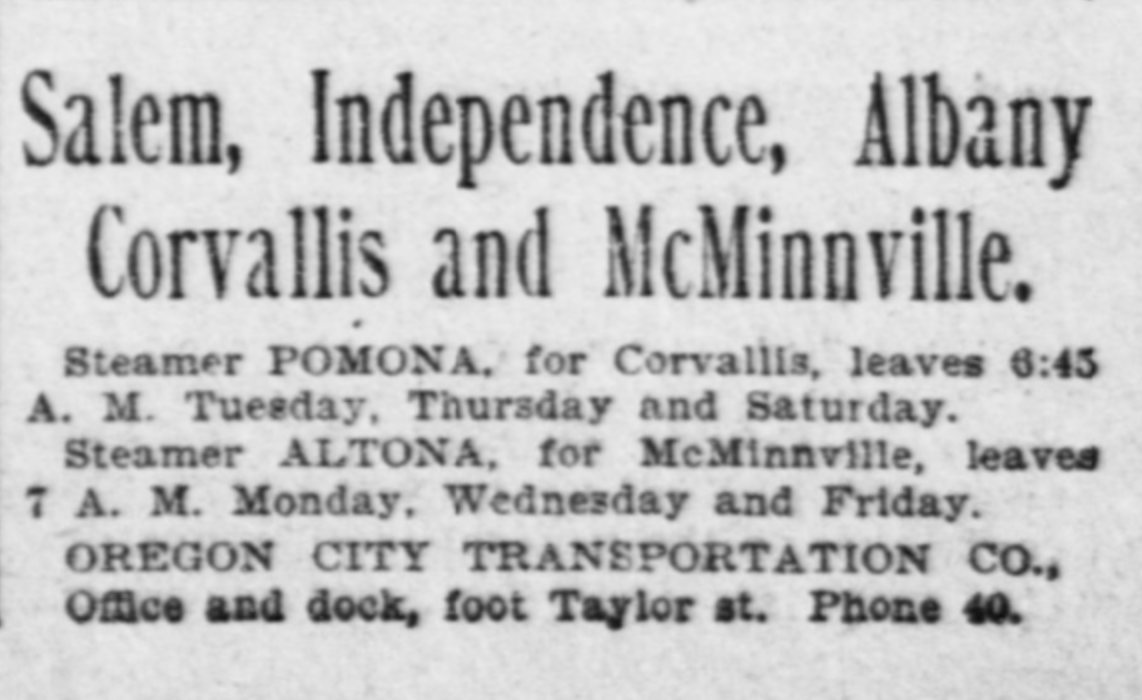
Advertisement placed January 6, 1902, for steamer service to points on the Willamette and Yamhill rivers, including McMinnville, which would have required use of the Yamhill lock.

In November 1901, Altona ran three times weekly from Portland to McMinnville, Oregon. On January 6, 1902, the Oregon City Transportation Company, also known as the "Yellow Stack Line" advertised regular service, on the Altona from Portland to McMinnville. Altona was scheduled to depart from Portland to McMinnville at 7:00 a.m. every Monday, Wednesday, and Friday, from the company's dock at the foot of Taylor Street in Portland.

On January 8, 1902, the water in the Yamhill River had risen too high to permit navigation through the recently completed Yamhill River lock and dam near Lafayette, Oregon. The sternwheel steamer Altona which had just resumed the run from Portland to McMinnville after a hiatus of about three weeks, was forced to proceed no further than Dayton on the Yamhill River.

The previous suspension of service by Altona had been due to lack of business. With no steamer service, the merchants of Dayton and McMinnville began considering building their own steamer. Captain Graham, of the Oregon City Transportation Company, the owner of Altona, conferred with the merchants and explained his position. The merchants agrees that they would provide sufficient business and Captain Graham agreed to keep Altona on the McMinnville run.

However, in 1902, despite the agreement of the merchants to patronize the steamers, the Oregon City Transportation Company withdrew their steamers permanently from service above Dayton. This was said by the company to have been because the difficulties in predicting when the lock would be open during the winter months made it impossible to build up business. Although efforts were made later to establish steamboat service to McMinnville, this withdrawal by the Oregon City Transportation Company marked the end of regular commercial steamboat use of the lock, even though it was to help establish that service that the lock had been built and completed just two years before.

== Transfer to Alaska ==
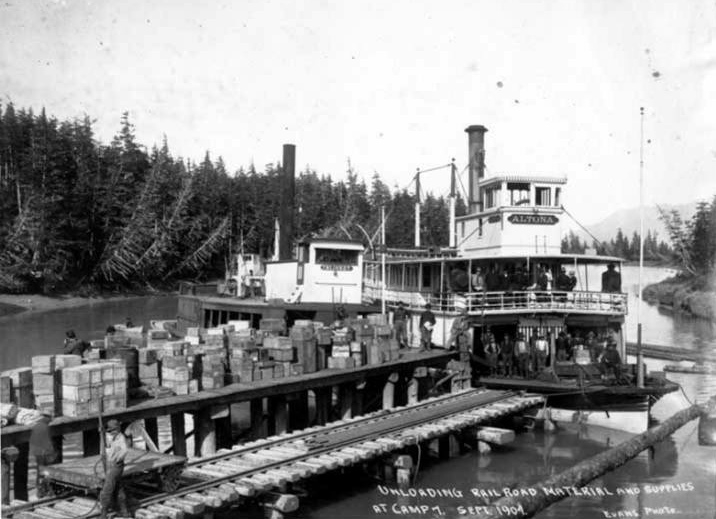
Altona and another steamer unloading rail supplies in Alaska, 1907

In 1907, Altona was transferred to Cordova, Alaska.
