= Benito =

Benito may refer to:

== Places ==
- Benito, Kentucky, United States
- Benito, Manitoba, Canada
- Benito River, a river in Equatorial Guinea
- Benito Beach, a community in Saskatchewan, Canada

== Other uses ==
- Benito (name)
  - Benito Mussolini, dictator of Italy during part of WW2
- Benito (film), a 1993 Italian film

== See also ==
- Benito Cereno, a novella by Herman Melville
- Benito Juárez (disambiguation)
- Bonito, fish in the family Scombridae
- Don Benito, a town and municipality in Badajoz, Extremadura, Spain
- Olabiran Muyiwa (born 1998), Nigerian footballer known as Benito
- San Benito (disambiguation)
