= Alto Braço River =

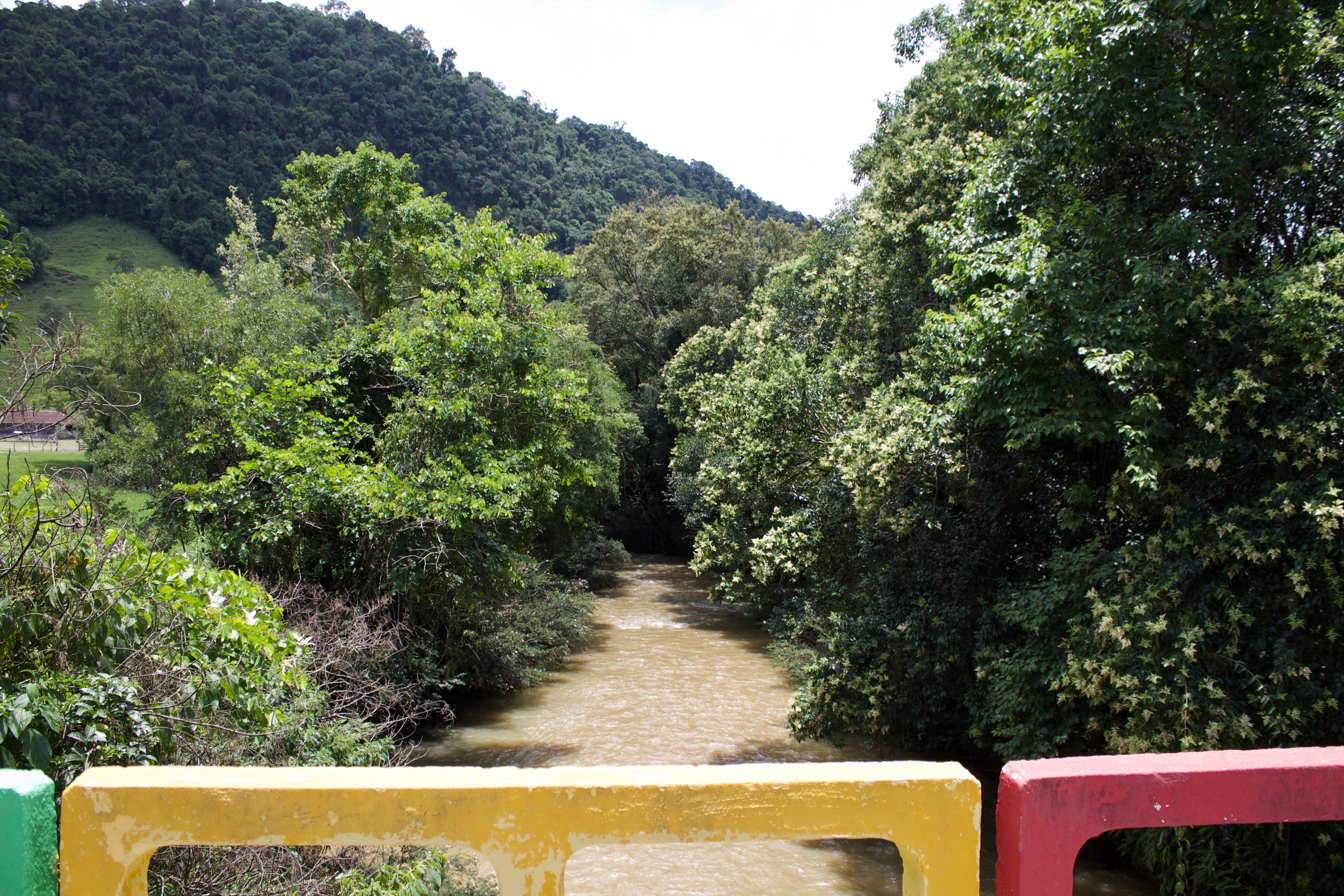
- Alto Braço River at Leoberto Leal

Location
- Country: Brazil

Physical characteristics
- Source
  - location: Santa Catarina state
- Mouth: Do Braço River
  - coordinates: 27°17′S 48°58′W

The Alto Braço River is a river of Santa Catarina state in southeastern Brazil. Some sources show its lower reaches as the Do Braço River; some say it retains its name until joining the Tijucas River.

== See also ==
- List of rivers of Santa Catarina
