= Do Braço River (Santa Catarina) =

Location
- Country: Brazil

Physical characteristics
- Source
  - location: Santa Catarina state
- Mouth: Tijucas River
  - coordinates: 27°16′S 48°51′W

The Do Braço River is a river of Santa Catarina state in southeastern Brazil, a tributary of the Tijucas River. Some sources treat it as part of the Alto Braço River.

== See also ==
- List of rivers of Santa Catarina
