= Leoberto Leal =

Coordinates: 27°30′25″S 49°17′13″W

- Municipality
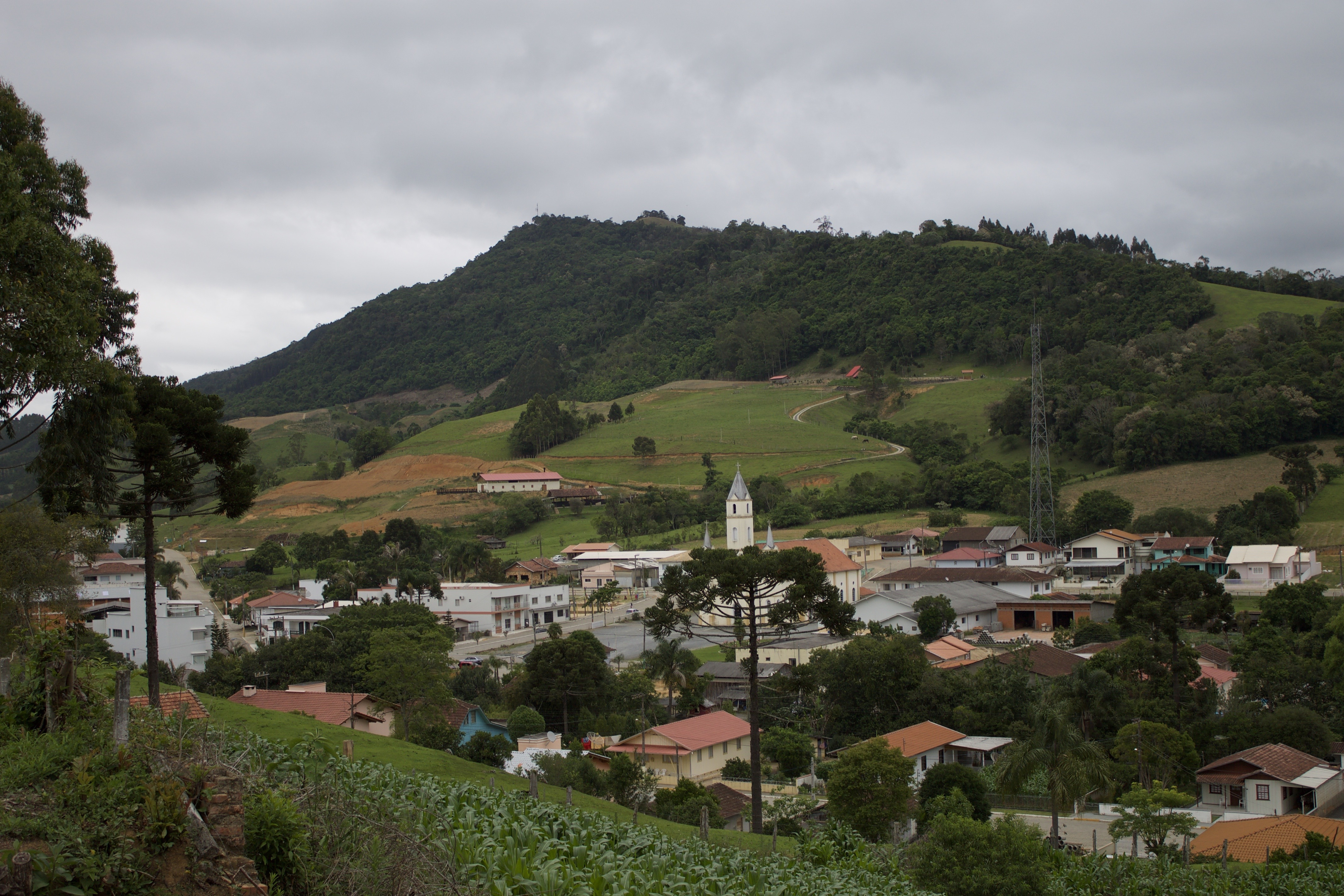

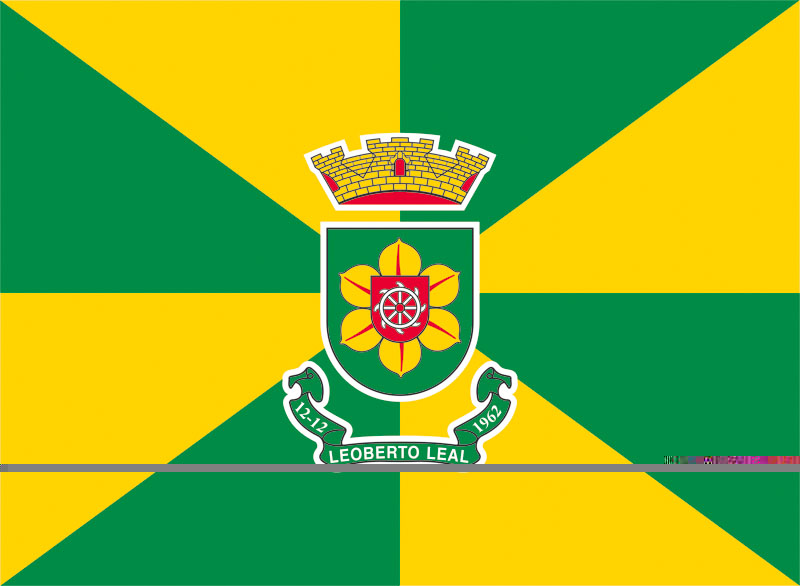
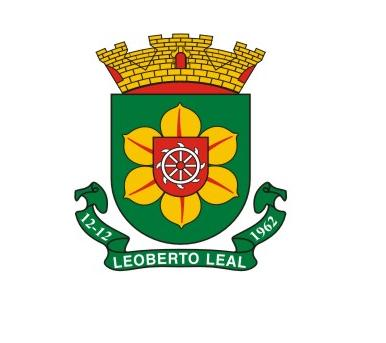
- Flag Coat of arms
- Interactive map of Leoberto Leal
- Country: Brazil
- Region: South
- State: Santa Catarina
- Mesoregion: Grande Florianópolis

Population (2020)
  - Total: 3,000
- Time zone: UTC -3

Leoberto Leal is a municipality in the state of Santa Catarina in the South region of Brazil.

== See also ==
- List of municipalities in Santa Catarina
